= Hurricane Michelle =

Category 4 Atlantic hurricane in 2001

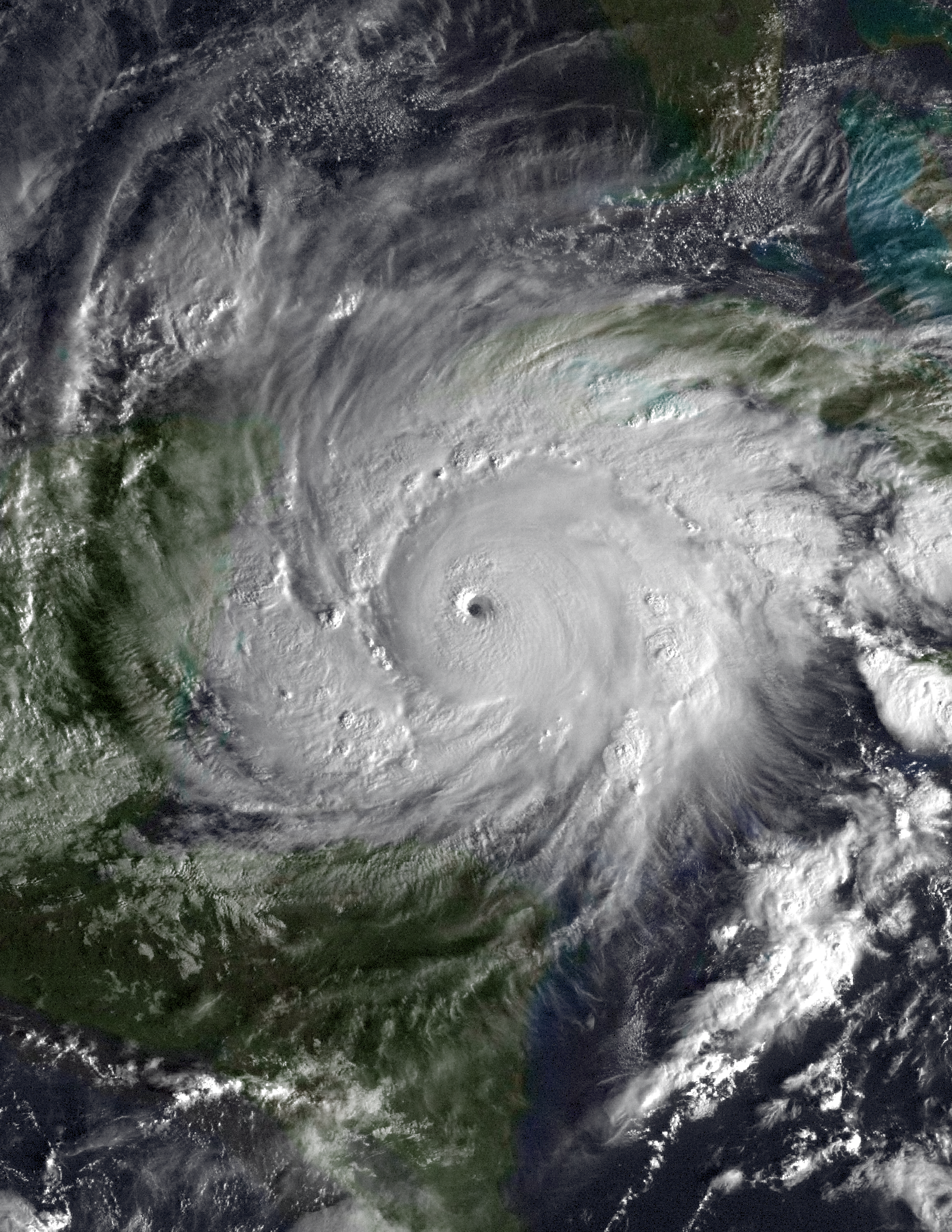
- Hurricane Michelle at its initial peak intensity on November 3

Meteorological history
- Formed: October 29, 2001
- Extratropical: November 5, 2001
- Dissipated: November 6, 2001

Category 4 major hurricane
- 1-minute sustained (SSHWS/NWS)
- Highest winds: 140 mph (220 km/h)
- Lowest pressure: 933 mbar (hPa); 27.55 inHg

Overall effects
- Fatalities: 48
- Damage: $2.43 billion (2001 USD)
- Areas affected: Jamaica; Costa Rica; Nicaragua; Honduras; Cayman Islands; Cuba; Florida; Lucayan Archipelago; Bermuda
- IBTrACS
- Part of the 2001 Atlantic hurricane season

Hurricane Michelle was, at the time, the costliest tropical cyclone in Cuban history and the strongest hurricane in terms of barometric pressure of the 2001 Atlantic hurricane season. The thirteenth named storm and seventh hurricane that year, Michelle developed from a tropical wave that had traversed into the western Caribbean Sea on October 29; the wave had initially moved off the coast of Africa 13 days prior. In its early developmental stages, the depression meandered over Nicaragua, later paralleling the Mosquito Coast before intensifying into tropical storm intensity on November 1; Michelle was upgraded to hurricane strength the following day. Shortly after, rapid intensification ensued within favorable conditions, with the storm's central barometric pressure dropping 51 mbar (51 hPa; 1.5 inHg) in 29 hours. After a slight fluctuation in strength, Michelle reached its peak intensity as a Category 4 hurricane with winds of 140 mph (230 km/h) and a minimum pressure of 933 mbar (933 hPa; 27.6 inHg). (Note: All sustained wind speeds are measured over a period of one minute and rounded to the nearest five following the standard set by the National Hurricane Center.) This tied Michelle with 1999's Lenny as the fourth most powerful November hurricane on record in the Atlantic basin, behind only the 1932 Cuba hurricane and 2020 hurricanes Iota and Eta. At roughly the same time, the hurricane began to accelerate northeastward; this brought the intense hurricane to a Cuban landfall within the Bay of Pigs later that day. Crossing over the island, Michelle weakened significantly, and was only a Category 1 hurricane upon reentry into the Atlantic Ocean. The hurricane later transitioned into an extratropical cyclone over The Bahamas on November 5, before being absorbed by a cold front the following day.

Hurricane Michelle caused widespread devastation across the western Caribbean during its eight-day trek. As a tropical wave, torrential rainfall occurred across Jamaica, causing mudslides and killing two people. Damage in the island country was estimated at $18 million. (Note: All damage totals are in 2001 United States dollars unless otherwise noted.) When the storm drifted over areas of Central America early in its existence, heavy rains isolated numerous villages and damaged infrastructure, affecting areas affected by Hurricane Mitch roughly three years prior. In Honduras and Nicaragua, 14 people were killed, with an additional 62 people unaccounted for. In the Cayman Islands, areas were affected by strong storm surge and flooding, particularly in Grand Cayman, where damage was totaled $28 million.

The majority of damage caused by Michelle occurred in Cuba, where the storm was the strongest tropical cyclone to make landfall on the island in over 49 years. Strong storm surge and heavy rainfall disrupted communication networks across the country. High winds and rain also destroyed buildings and damaged the sugar cane crop. At the time, Michelle was the costliest hurricane in Cuban history with an estimated $2 billion in damage; this figure was greatly surpassed by Hurricane Ike nearly seven years later. As a weakening system, Michelle moved past Florida and the Bahamas. Strong waves caused severe beach erosion and winds damaged property. Throughout the entirety of Michelle's track, 22 people were killed, and damage was estimated at $2.43 billion (2001 USD; $4.42 billion 2026 USD). After the season, the name Michelle was retired and was replaced with Melissa for the 2007 Atlantic hurricane season.

== Meteorological history ==
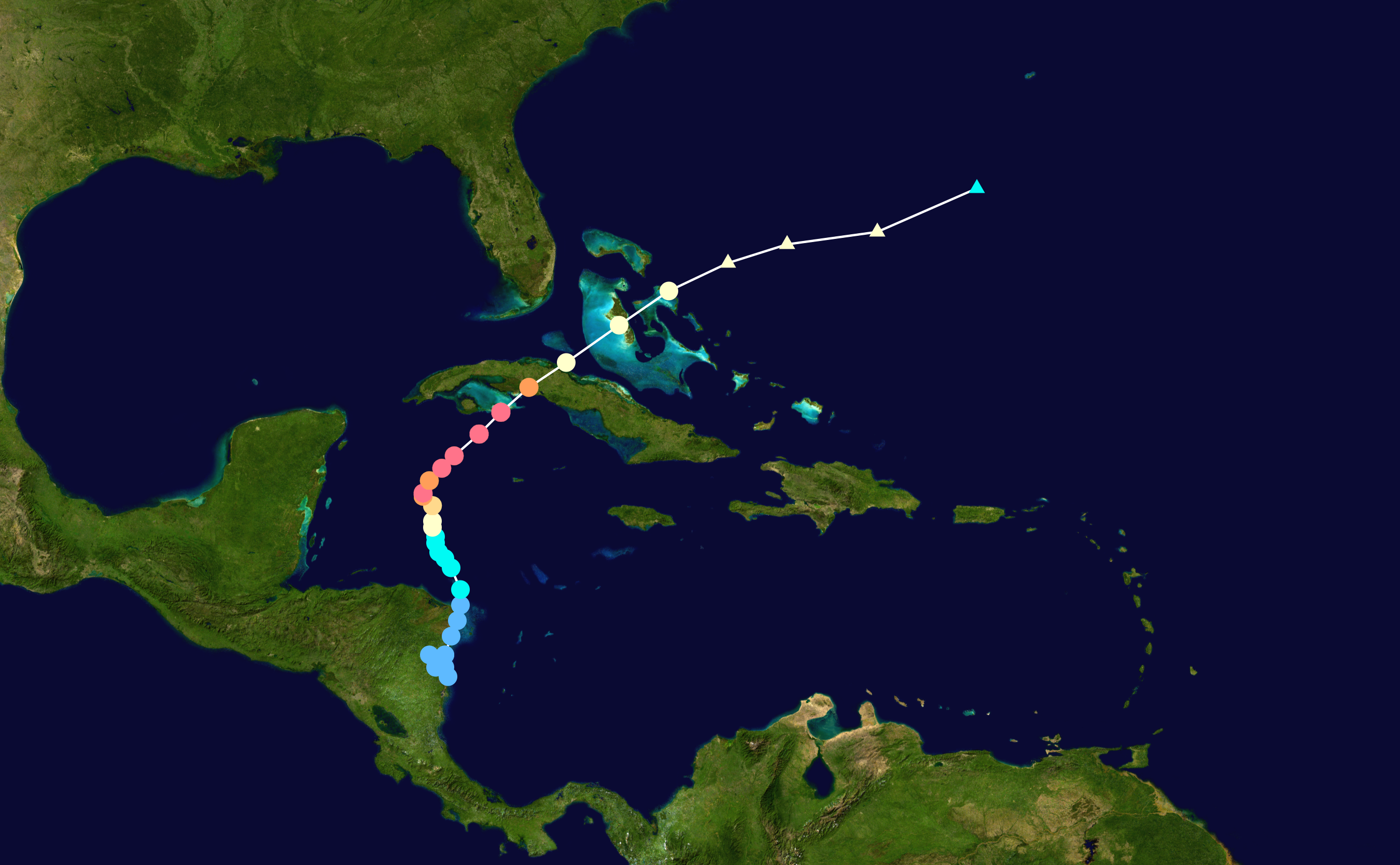
Map plotting the storm's track and intensity, according to the Saffir–Simpson scale Map key Saffir–Simpson scale Tropical depression (≤38 mph, ≤62 km/h) Tropical storm (39–73 mph, 63–118 km/h) Category 1 (74–95 mph, 119–153 km/h) Category 2 (96–110 mph, 154–177 km/h) Category 3 (111–129 mph, 178–208 km/h) Category 4 (130–156 mph, 209–251 km/h) Category 5 (≥157 mph, ≥252 km/h) Unknown Storm type Tropical cyclone Subtropical cyclone Extratropical cyclone, remnant low, tropical disturbance, or monsoon depression

On October 16, 2001, a tropical wave moved westward off the coast of Africa and moved into the Atlantic Ocean. At the time, the wave produced minimal convective and thunderstorm activity. On October 23, the disturbance crossed the Lesser Antilles before moving into the Caribbean Sea while showing minimal signs of tropical development. Three days later, the wave moved into the western Caribbean, spawning a broad low-pressure area off the coast of Nicaragua. At 1800 UTC on October 29, a reconnaissance flight confirmed the development of a tropical depression 40 mi (64 km) south-southwest of Puerto Cabezas, Nicaragua. At the time, convection was displaced primarily to the north of the center of circulation, and the storm was situated in a weak steering pattern; as such, initial forecasts predicted for the depression, designated as Tropical Depression Fifteen, to slowly move generally northward. Later that day, a burst of convection occurred over the circulation center of the depression, indicating an increase in organization. The disturbance meandered over eastern Nicaragua for 36 hours before emerging into the Caribbean Sea near Cabo Gracias a Dios by 2100 UTC on October 31. Upon emerging into the Caribbean Sea, the depression quickly organized, and the National Hurricane Center (NHC) upgraded the depression to tropical storm strength at 0000 UTC the following day, based on information from a reconnaissance flight prior. As such, the tropical storm was designated with the name Michelle.

Gradual strengthening occurred throughout November 1, as Michelle's cloud tops began to cool as it drifted northward, signifying strengthening. At the time, the NHC predicted that there was a roughly 12 percent chance for the tropical storm to rapidly intensify; by that time the storm had met three of the organization's five criterion for rapid intensification. During the day, fluctuations in convective activity occurred and there were some signs of wind shear affecting the cyclone, but there was a general strengthening trend. Two dropsondes deployed within the system early on November 2 observed hurricane-force winds within Michelle; based on this data the NHC upgraded Michelle to hurricane intensity at 1200 UTC that day, while the storm was situated 290 mi (470 km) south-southeast of the Guanahacabibes Peninsula.

A period of rapid intensification began shortly after as Michelle's satellite presentation improved, with the cyclone's minimum barometric pressure falling 51 mbar (51 hPa; 1.5 inHg) in 29 hours. At 0000 UTC on November 3, the hurricane attained Category 2 hurricane intensity. At roughly the same time, the hurricane's eye became more apparent on satellite imagery. By 1200 UTC later that day, Michelle had intensified to a Category 4 hurricane. Six hours later, the hurricane weakened to Category 3 intensity, but reached its minimum barometric pressure of 934 mbar (934 hPa; 27.6 inHg). Afterwards, Michelle's central pressure began to rise; despite the trend, its maximum sustained winds also strengthened as it curved northeastward. Despite having its convective organization disrupted and its eye no longer as apparent on November 4, Michelle attained winds of 140 mph (230 km/h) by 0600 UTC that day; these would be the highest sustained winds estimated for the system throughout its existence.

At 1800 UTC on November 4, Michelle made landfall on Cayo Largo del Sur as a Category 4 hurricane with winds of 140 mph (230 km/h); this was followed shortly after with a landfall on the Bay of Pigs five hours later as a slightly weaker storm. When Michelle made landfall on the Cuban mainland, it was the strongest landfalling hurricane in Cuban history since the landfall of Hurricane Fox in 1952. At the time, the hurricane's minimum barometric pressure was 950 mbar (950 hPa; 28 inHg). Over Cuba, Michelle's center of circulation was significantly disrupted, and as a result the hurricane decreased in intensity; by the time it had emerged into the Atlantic Ocean on November 5, winds were only estimated at 90 mph (140 km/h). Southwesterly wind shear further inhibited any additional tropical development, and as such Michelle began to transition into an extratropical cyclone. That day, the weakening hurricane made landfalls over Andros Island and Eleuthera Island before becoming fully extratropical by 0000 UTC on November 6, while still maintaining hurricane-force winds. The extratropical system persisted for roughly 18 more hours before it was absorbed by an approaching cold front.

== Preparations ==
=== Cuba ===
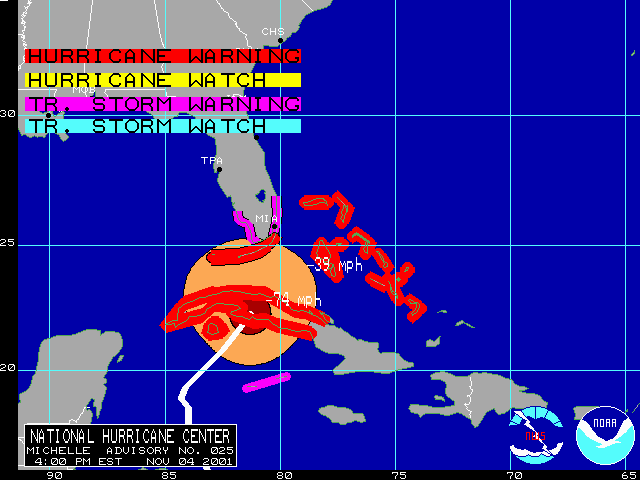
Warnings and watches associated with Hurricane Michelle as it made landfall on Cuba on November 4

As Hurricane Michelle approached the Cuban coast, the government of Cuba issued a hurricane watch for the western Cuban provinces of Pinar del Río, La Habana, Matanzas, and Isla de la Juventud at 2100 UTC on November 1. The following day, the same hurricane watch was extended eastward to include all provinces from Pinar del Río to Ciego de Ávila; all hurricane watches in Cuba were upgraded to hurricane warnings at 1100 UTC on November 3. All warnings in Cuba were discontinued once Michelle began to accelerate out to sea at 1200 UTC on November 5.

Prior to reaching the coast, Michelle was expected to be the strongest Cuban tropical cyclone in at least 75 years. The Cuban Red Cross deployed 24,500 volunteers across Cuba to assist civil defense teams in evacuation procedures for potentially affected populations. By November 4, an estimated 590,000 people were evacuated across the country, including 80 percent of the population of the province of Pinar del Río. In Havana, authorities evacuated 150,000 people. Coastal tourist resorts were cleared, and 35,500 students were evacuated out of camps hosted on the Zapata Peninsula. On Cuba's southwestern islands including Cayo Largo and Isla de la Juventud, 500 tourists were evacuated. The entire population of Surgidero de Batabanó was evacuated. In addition to the evacuations, the government sent food, water, and medicine supplies to areas south of the capital. All domestic and international flights to and from the country were cancelled.

=== Elsewhere ===
At 17:00 UTC on November 1, a tropical storm watch was issued for Grand Cayman Island. Three hours prior, the National Hurricane Center issued a tropical storm warning in conjunction with a hurricane watch for areas of the Florida Keys from Ocean Reef, Florida to the Dry Tortugas. At 03:00 UTC on November 4, a hurricane watch was issued for areas of the northwestern and central Bahamas. At the same time, a new tropical storm warning was issued for the east coast of Florida between Jupiter Inlet and Ocean Reef, and for the state's western coast south of Bonita Beach. At 06:00 UTC, the tropical storm watch for Grand Cayman was upgraded and extended to include the entirety of the Cayman Islands. Six hours later, the hurricane watch for the Florida Keys was upgraded to warning status. Early the next day, a hurricane watch was issued for Bermuda after Michelle made its final Cuban landfall. Meanwhile, the tropical storm warning issued for the Cayman Islands was discontinued. As Michelle accelerated away from landmasses, warnings and watches were discontinued. All tropical cyclone warnings in the United States were discontinued by 21:00 UTC that day. At the same time, however, the hurricane watch for Bermuda was changed to a tropical storm warning; this warning was sustained for a day before being discontinued, shortly after all warnings in the Bahamas were also discontinued.

== Impact ==
Fatalities and monetary damage
| Country | Deaths | Missing | Damage (USD) |
|---|---|---|---|
| The Bahamas | 0 | 0 | $300 million |
| Cayman Islands | 0 | 0 | $28 million |
| Costa Rica | 0 | 0 | $1 million |
| Cuba | 5 | 0 | $2 billion |
| Haiti | 1 | 0 | $20,000 |
| Honduras | 21 | 50 | $5 million |
| Jamaica | 5 | 0 | $18 million |
| Nicaragua | 16 | 12 | $1 million |
| United States | 0 | 0 | $66,000 |
| Totals: | 48 | 62 | ~$2.43 billion |
Because of differing sources, totals may not match.

Hurricane Michelle brought torrential rains along its path through the western Caribbean Sea, killing 22 people and causing extensive damage in Central America and Cuba.

=== Central America ===
In its early developmental stages as a tropical depression, Michelle drifted over areas of Central America for roughly 36 hours, dropping torrential rainfall and causing widespread flooding in areas affected by Hurricane Mitch almost exactly three years prior. The hardest hit region was Gracias a Dios Department in northeastern Honduras, where at one point 100 villages were isolated by the floods. The torrential rainfall caused the displacement of at least 100,000 people from their residences. Across Central America, over 27,300 people were evacuated from flooded areas.

In Honduras, the floods damaged 245 homes, resulting in the displacement of 4,393 people across the country. Six bridges sustained at least partial damage, of which three were destroyed. As a result of the damage, the government of Honduras declared a state of emergency for five departments – Colón, Atlántida, Yoro, Cortés, and Santa Bárbara. The floods caused by Michelle were further exacerbated by a cold front which lingered over the region, dropping additional rainfall. Of the affected departments, Yoro was the most affected, with no supply of drinkable water and electricity following the flooding. Near Yoro, a bridge crossing the Cuyamapa River collapsed due to the floodwaters. Despite the heavy rainfall, areas of Honduras suffering from a prolonged drought did not receive beneficial rainfall. Overall, the floods in Honduras killed 21 people and caused $5 million in damage. Thirty-five of the country's water systems were destroyed. The rains also caused the loss of 70 percent of bean crops.

Although the precursor to Michelle remained stationary primarily over Nicaragua, damage was not as significant as in Honduras due to the storm's displacement of convection to the north. Nonetheless, floods still isolated villages and other communities in the Nicaraguan districts of Bonaza, Rosita, Siuna, Puerto Cabezas, Waspam, and to a lesser extent, Prinzapolka. In those areas, roads and bridges were damaged, and in some cases, destroyed. The heavy rains also damaged crops. Due to the rains, an estimated 6,000 people evacuated from their homes. The port city of Puerto Cabezas was partially flooded. As a result of Michelle, a total of 16 deaths were confirmed, and damage in the country was estimated at $1 million. In Costa Rica, Michelle caused anomalously high rainfall, resulting in flooding. Overall, damage in Costa Rica totaled $1 million, though no deaths were reported.

=== Jamaica ===
As the precursor tropical wave to Michelle drifted through the western Caribbean Sea, it produced torrential rainfall on the island of Jamaica, causing widespread flooding. Several residences on Annotto Bay and Port Maria were flooded. As a result, 163 evacuees sought shelter in locations in Annotto Bay. In Portland, a shelter was opened for effected populations; in the same parish, six homes were swept away from their foundations. In the parishes of Saint Catherine, Saint Andrew, and Saint Ann, several roads were blocked by debris. The Jamaican National Works Agency (NWA) worked to clear the road debris. The blocked roads isolated seven Jamaican villages for an extended period of time.

After tropical cyclogenesis, Michelle passed to the northwest of Jamaica, producing additional rainfall. In a 48-hour period beginning on October 29, a location measured 41.65 inches (1,058 mm), denoting an average rainfall rate of 0.86 inches (22 mm) per hour. Many other locations reported high rainfall totals over a ten-day period throughout Michelle's passage near Jamaica. Near Spur Tree Hill, an oil spill resulted from the flooding. Roads that were previously cleaned of debris a few days prior were covered again by the additional rainfall. The rains also disrupted the country's communication and electrical grid, leaving 6,000 homes without power in affected regions. The widespread power outages in conjunction with invasive floodwaters also caused the cessation of 31 water plants run by the National Water Commission. Overall, 30 homes were destroyed by flooding caused by Michelle as it passed to the northwest. Extensive damage was reported to small livestock, bananas, plantains, vegetables, and coffee. Coffee crops were severely affected in Portland and Saint Andrew Parishes, with losses calculated at J$102.6 million (US$2.2 million). Roughly 400 acres (160 hectares) of banana plantations were damaged over four parishes, amounting to J$18.2 million (US$400,000) in damage. The plantain crop, mostly grown for domestic usage, suffered extensive damage valued at J$22 million (US$480,000). Losses sustained to livestock were estimated at J$30.8 million (US$670,000).

Overall, floods caused widespread damage throughout Jamaica. The watersheds of the Spanish and Swift Rivers were the worst affected areas. Near the coast, the rivers began to overflow due to excess floodwater, eroding beach roads and three major highways. In Portland Parish, the rains caused numerous landslides. In the community of Bybrook alone, it was estimated that roughly 7,000,000 ft^{3} (200,000 m^{3}) of material was deposited in the village. An assessment of the damage concluded that 500 homes were destroyed beyond repair, while an additional 561 homes were at least damaged by the floods and heavy rain. While one school was damaged solely by the floods, six other schools were damaged due to their use as shelters. Damage on Jamaica due to Michelle totaled $18 million, of which $11.8 million was due to crop and livestock losses. Damage to bridges alone totaled J$143.7 million (US$3.1 million). Five fatalities were also confirmed, and 340 people were displaced from their homes.

=== Cayman Islands ===
In early November, Hurricane Michelle brought heavy surf, storm surge, and flooding to the Cayman Islands. Of the islands in the archipelago, Grand Cayman experienced the worst effects from Michelle, particularly along the island's west coast. Rainfall peaked at 6.52 in (166 mm) in Grand Cayman; the same station recorded a peak wind gust of 44 mph (71 km/h). The rains caused localized flooding in the western and southern portions of the island. Another weather station in Cayman Brac observed a peak wind gust of 40 mph (64 km/h). Overall, damage from the Cayman Islands totaled $60 million.

=== Cuba ===
Costliest Cuban hurricanes
| Rank | Hurricane | Season | Damage | Refs. |
|---|---|---|---|---|
| 1 | Irma | 2017 | $13.2 billion | |
| 2 | Ike | 2008 | $7.3 billion | |
| 3 | Matthew | 2016 | $2.58 billion | |
| 4 | Gustav | 2008 | $2.1 billion | |
| 5 | Michelle | 2001 | $2 billion | |
| 5 | Sandy | 2012 | $2 billion | |
| 7 | Dennis | 2005 | $1.5 billion | |
| 8 | Ivan | 2004 | $1.2 billion | |
| 9 | Rafael | 2024 | $1.08 billion | |
| 10 | Charley | 2004 | $923 million | |

In Cuba, about 750,000 people and 741,000 animals were evacuated prior to the hurricane's arrival. Hurricane Michelle quickly crossed the island as a Category 4 hurricane, the strongest since 1952's Hurricane Fox. To the south of Cuba, Cayo Largo del Sur received a 9–10 foot storm surge, inundating the entire island with water. Closer to Cuba, the Isle of Youth experienced 11.83 inches (300 mm) of rain with 15-foot (4.6 m) waves, causing extensive power outages and flooding.

On the coast of western and southern Cuba, Michelle produced 4–5 foot waves, along with a heavy storm surge. Rainfall amounts up to 754 mm/29.69 inches were recorded across the island. In addition, 300 mm/11.83 inches was reported at Punta del Este. The provinces of Matanzas, Villa Clara, and Cienfuegos were hardest hit, where 10,000 homes were destroyed and another 100,000 damaged. Severe damage was also reported to the sugar cane and in the tourist town of Varadero. In Havana, winds and rain destroyed 23 buildings, with many others damaged. Due to well-executed warnings and evacuations, only 5 people were killed in Cuba. The Category 4 hurricane caused US$1.8 billion in damage.

The United States offered aid to the island, an act it had done in the past despite a political embargo. President Fidel Castro refused, believing his country would survive with enough resources for the reconstruction process.

=== Florida ===
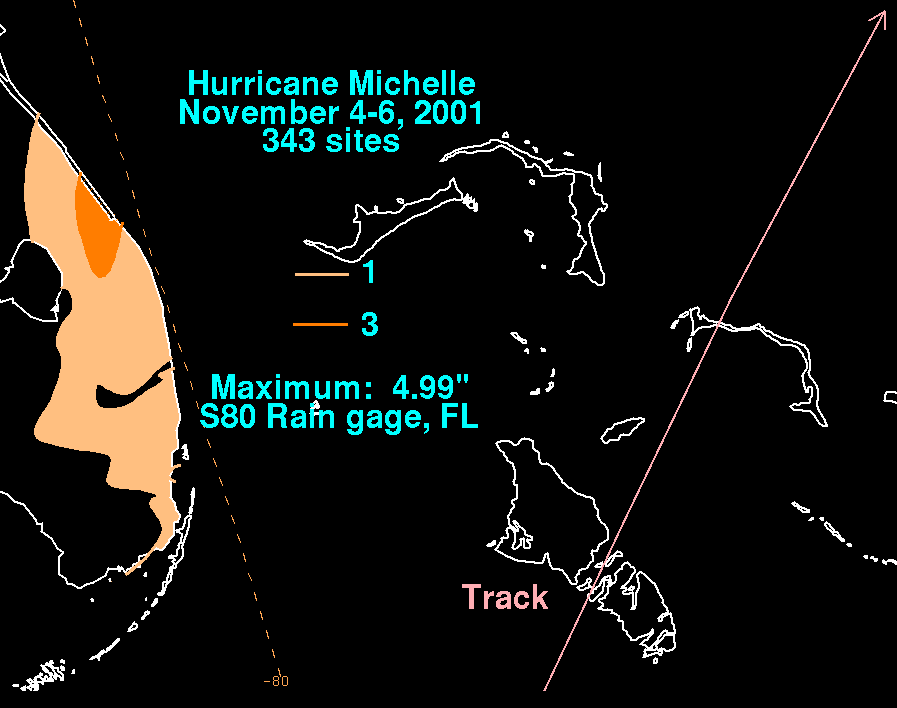
Rainfall totals from Hurricane Michelle in Florida

Severe beach erosion due to increased swells over several days took place from Hollywood Beach to Hallandale Beach. At high tide on November 4, water topped the seawall, damaging it and nearby structures leaving $20,000 in damages. The cost to restore the beaches was estimated at $10 million. The highest winds in relation to the storm were recorded in Sombrero Key; sustained winds reached 49 mph (79 km/h) and gusts reached 60 mph (97 km/h). A storm surge of 1 to 2 ft (0.30 to 0.61 m) was recorded along the southeast coastline of Florida. Damages from the hurricane amounted to $50,000.

Two tornadoes touched down in the state within the outer bands of the hurricane. The first formed as a waterspout and moved onshore near Bill Baggs Beach and destroyed two Chikee huts, costing $6,000, warranting F0 intensity, before dissipating. The second and stronger of the two tornadoes, rated F1, tracked for 2 mi (3.2 km) in Palm Beach County. Windows were blown out of vehicles and buildings, trees and signs were downed and a small area of sugar cane was leveled by the tornado. Damages from the tornado amounted to $10,000. A NOAA WP-3D Orion hurricane hunter aircraft was damaged during a mission into the storm.

=== Bahamas ===
Wettest tropical cyclones and their remnants in the Bahamas Highest-known totals
| Precipitation | | | Storm | Location | Ref. |
| Rank | mm | in | Storm | Location | Ref. |
|---|---|---|---|---|---|
| 1 | 747.5 | 29.43 | Noel 2007 | Long Island | |
| 2 | 580.1 | 22.84 | Dorian 2019 | Hope Town | |
| 3 | 500.3 | 19.70 | Matthew 2016 | Matthew Town, Inagua | |
| 4 | 436.6 | 17.19 | Flora 1963 | Duncan Town | |
| 5 | 390.1 | 15.36 | Inez 1966 | Nassau Airport | |
| 6 | 337.1 | 13.27 | Fox 1952 | New Providence | |
| 7 | 321.1 | 12.64 | Michelle 2001 | Nassau | |
| 8 | 309.4 | 12.18 | Erin 1995 | Church Grove | |
| 9 | 260.0 | 9.88 | Fay 2008 | Freeport | |
| 10 | 236.7 | 9.32 | Floyd 1999 | Little Harbor Abacos | |

Because Hurricane Michelle was weakened and moving rapidly as it moved through the Bahamas, no deaths or injuries were reported. The hurricane still retained some of its strength, and caused 12.64 inches (321 mm) of rain in Nassau, while New Providence received a storm surge of 5–8 feet. Flooding was reported throughout the archipelago and high winds downed numerous trees, resulting in 200,000 power outages. A few homes sustained roof damage and the roof a shopping center in Nassau was blown into a nearby funeral home. The radio tower of the station MORE FM was snapped in half by high winds, resulting in a severe disruption of radio broadcasts.

== Aftermath ==
Ships carrying tons of frozen chicken legs and corn arrived in Havana's harbor on December 16, to aid in the recovery of Cuba from Hurricane Michelle. The shipments are part of a one-time $30 million purchase of U.S. food by the Cuban government to assist in the country's present food shortage.

The Cuban government refused an initial U.S. offer of humanitarian assistance, but accepted a proposal to purchase the goods instead. Although the United States has maintained an economic embargo on Cuba for decades, U.S. law does allow shipments of food and medicine to the communist-controlled island. But until now the Cuban government has refused to buy American food because of the restrictions, including a ban on direct U.S. financing of food sales.

Other aid from the international community is helping Cuba survive Michelle's aftermath. Cuba was promised $600,000 in aid from Chinese leader Li Peng, who was visiting when the hurricane struck. Venezuela also sent humanitarian assistance.

=== Retirement ===
Because of the significant damage and number of deaths in multiple countries, the name Michelle was retired in the spring of 2002 by the World Meteorological Organization, and will never again be used for a North Atlantic tropical cyclone. The name was replaced with Melissa for the 2007 season.

== See also ==
- Tropical cyclones in 2001
- List of wettest tropical cyclones in Cuba
- List of Cuba hurricanes
- List of Category 4 Atlantic hurricanes
- November 2001 Atlantic Canada storm complex – a coastal extratropical cyclone that formed from the remnants of Michelle and caused minor damage in Atlantic Canada
