= Rosita, Nicaragua =

Rosita
- Municipality
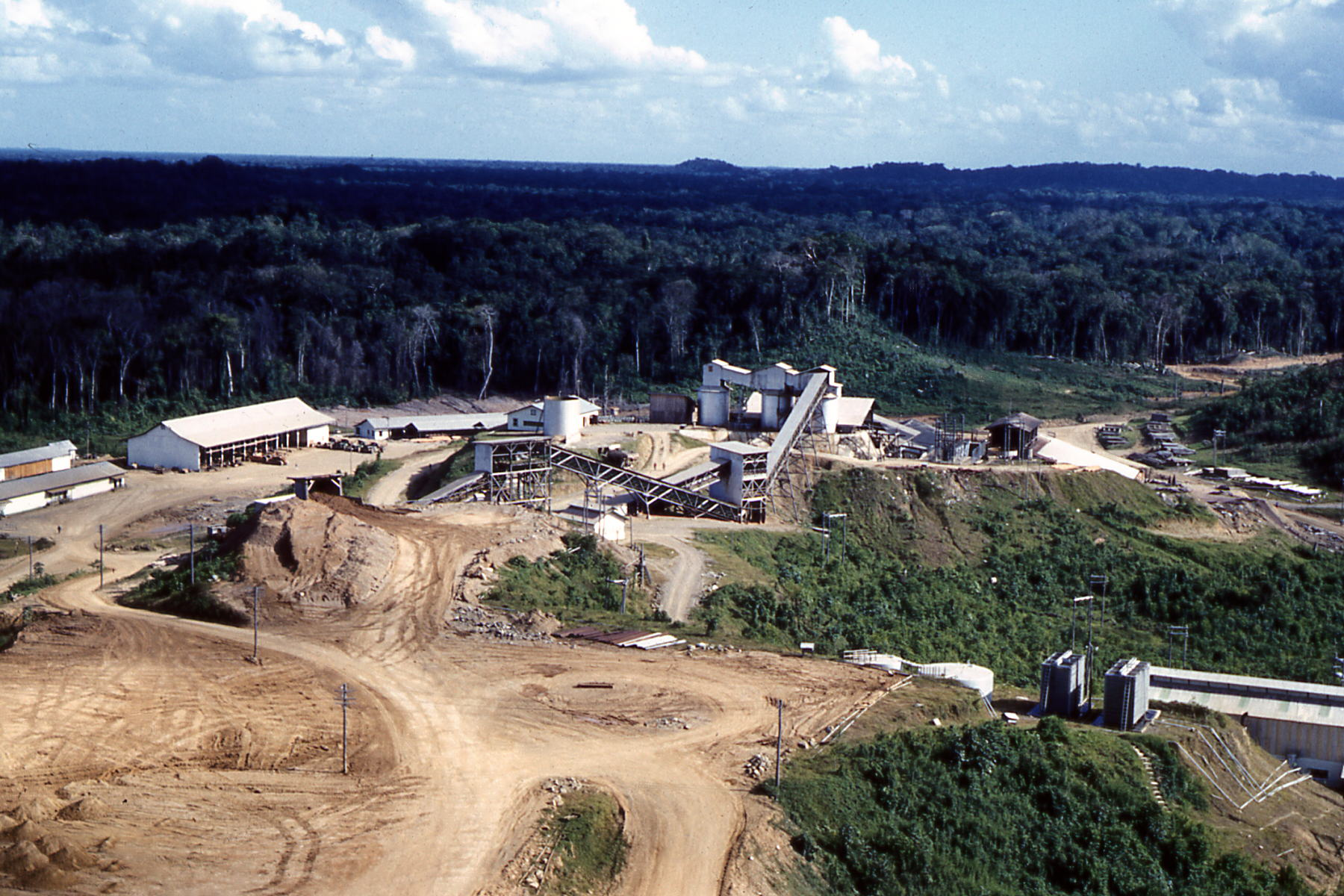
- Rosita and Bonanza Mine and town complex in the late 1950s

- Location in Nicaragua
- Coordinates: 13°53′N 84°24′W
- Country: Nicaragua
- Department: North Caribbean Autonomous Region

Area
  - Municipality: 851.52 sq mi (2,205.42 km^{2})
- Elevation: 190 ft (58 m)

Population (2023 estimate)
  - Municipality: 39,527
  - Density: 46.419/sq mi (17.923/km^{2})
  - Urban: 16,590
- Time zone: UTC-6 (Central Time)
  - Summer (DST): UTC-6 (No DST)
- Climate: Af

Rosita (Spanish pronunciation: [roˈsita]) is a town and a municipality in the North Caribbean Autonomous Region of Nicaragua.

== Geography ==
The municipal term borders to the north with the municipality of Waspán, to the south with the municipalities of Prinzapolka and Bonanza, to the east with the municipalities of Puerto Cabezas and Prinzapolka, and to the west with the municipality of Siuna.

The municipal head town is located 480 kilometers from the capital, Managua.

== History ==
The municipality, formerly known as Santa Rita, grew as a settlement in the 1940s, when mining exploitation began by the Rosario Mining Company. Explorations between 1951 and 1955 led to the discovery and exploitation of copper ore, which ceased to be extracted in 1975 with the fall in the price of this metal. After the mine was nationalized in 1979, it was abandoned and completely dismantled in 1982.

Rosita became part of the municipality of Prinzapolka in 1971, but in 1989 Rosita separated from Prinzapolka to form its own municipality. In 2005, Rosita was elevated to the status of a city.

== Demography ==
Rosita has a current population of 38,629 inhabitants. Of the total population, 51.6% are men and 48.4% are women. Nearly 41.9% of the population lives in the urban area.

== Nature and climate ==
The municipality has a very humid subtropical climate, with annual rainfall ranging between 1900 and 3290 mm.

== Localities ==
The urban case of the capital, Rosita, is divided into 11 neighborhoods and the rural area into 81 communities.

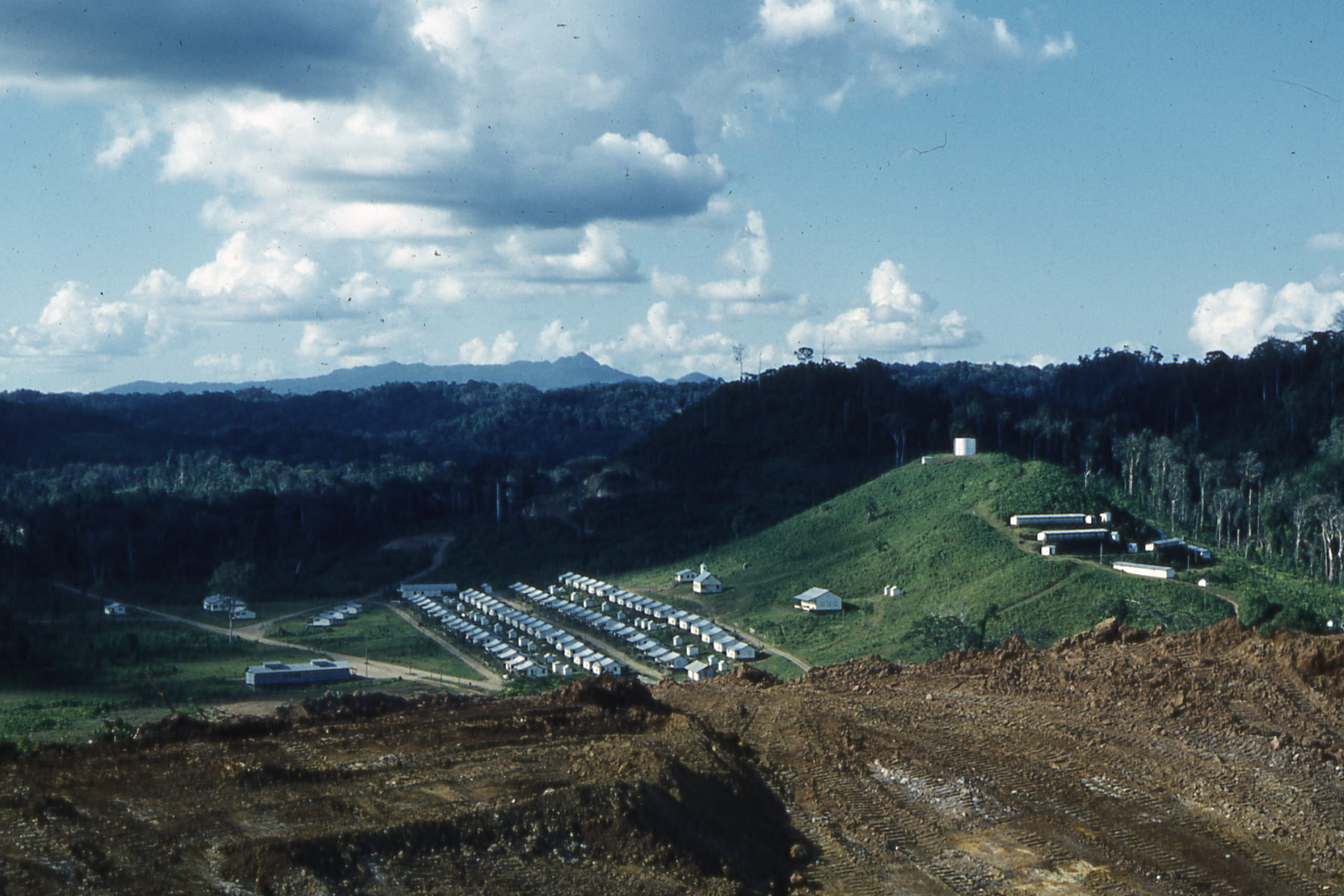
Mining town of Rosita and Bonanza area filmed in the late 1950s

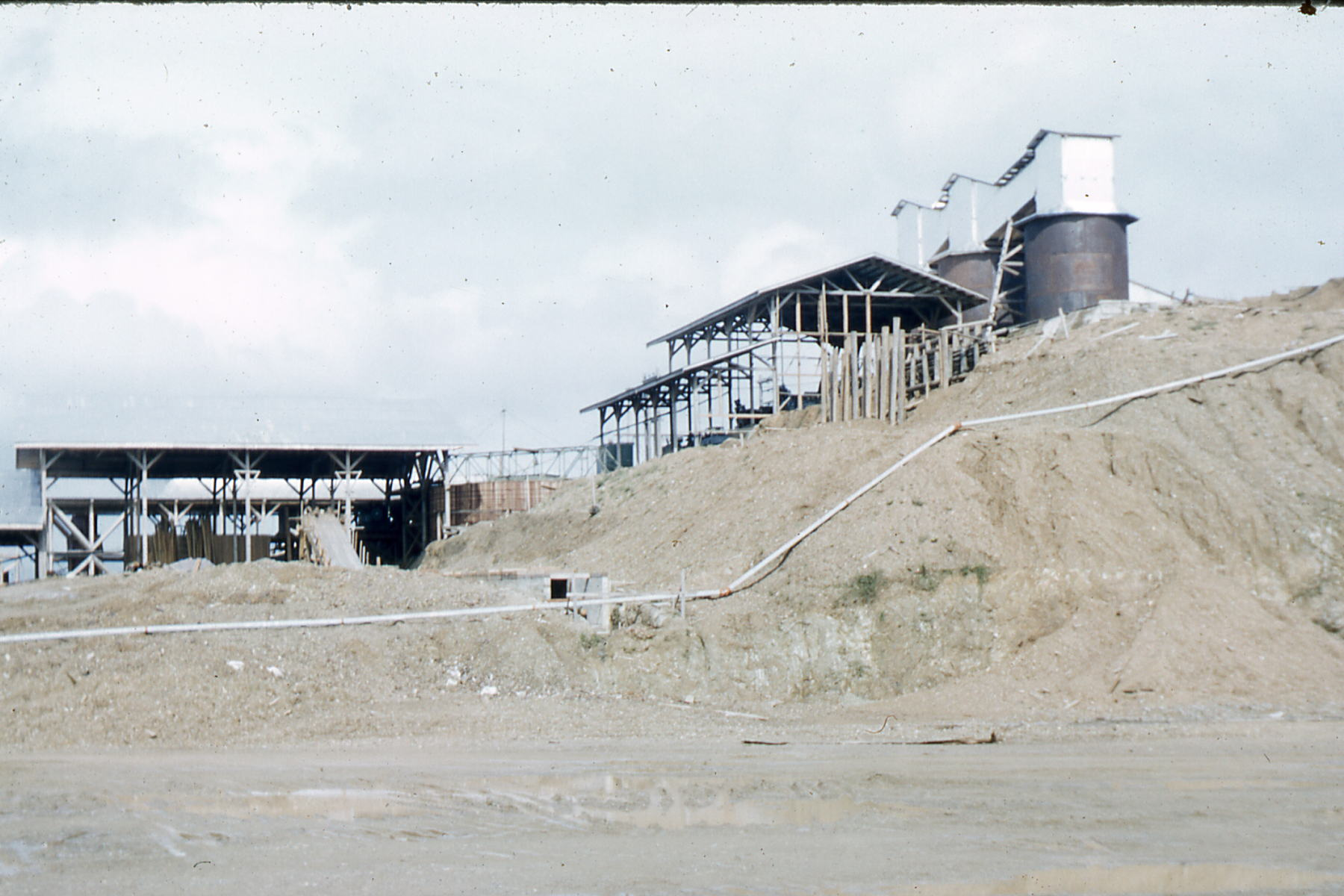
Rosita and Bonanza Mine complex in the late 1950s

== Economy ==
The main economic activity is agriculture, with very poor soil that results in an unemployment rate of 80%.

== Culture ==
As the municipality is multiethnic (Sumos, Miskitos, Creoles, and Mestizos), each ethnicity has its own festivals, which are mainly celebrated in rural communities, maintaining the customs of their ancestors.

The typical foods are wabul made with bananas, cassava, or quequisque, and buña, made with pejibaye, cassava, and fruits of the period.

== Transport ==
The municipality is located along the main highway between the west of Nicaragua and the city of Puerto Cabezas on the Caribbean Sea. Rosita has a small airport, which, however, lacks regular traffic (IATA: RFS).

== See also ==
- Municipalities of Nicaragua
