= Awas Tingni =

Indigenous Mayangna community in Nicaragua

Awas Tingni is an Indigenous Mayangna community of some 2,400 members on the Mosquito Coast of Nicaragua, in the municipality of Waspam in the North Caribbean Coast Autonomous Region. Awas Tingni is located near the junction of the Rio Wawa and the river Awas Tingni in a densely forested area. In Mayagna, Awas Tingni means "Pine River" and denotes both the town and the river by which it is situated. Awas Tingni was named due to the large pine forest in the area, similar to the pine barrens of the mid-Atlantic United States.

In 2001 the Mayagna won a landmark case against the government of Nicaragua in which the Inter-American Court of Human Rights held that they had a right as indigenous people to their collective land. In December 2008, the government completed a process of demarking and titling the land, giving them title to a total of 73,394 hectares (181,360 acres).

== Background ==
This area along the Atlantic Coast, called the Miskito Coast, of Nicaragua, is thickly forested and isolated. It has long been a traditional territory of indigenous peoples. The Mayagna community of Awas Tingi has about 2,400 members in the municipality of Waspam in the North Caribbean Coast Autonomous Region.

=== Population ===
The population of Awas Tingni is relatively young; there are about 500 members of the community (roughly 1/4 of the population) under the age of five. The community has one primary school, which has split sessions, or classes for two separate groups of students: one group of students attends classes in the morning and another group attends classes in the afternoon because the school is so crowded. A secondary school serves about 30 students.

In addition, Awas Tingni has one Moravian church and one Baptist church. The number of churchgoers in Awas Tingni is now so great that the two churches lack sufficient space for all the congregants.

=== Languages ===
The people of Awas Tingni speak Sumo (also called Mayagna) as a first language. Many are also fluent in Miskito, which is from the same language family and is the majority language among indigenous peoples in northeast Nicaragua, and Spanish is taught in the schools. The Mayagna learn Miskito to communicate with the indigenous people in the surrounding villages, and Spanish is the language of education and government in Nicaragua.

The people in Awas Tingni raise cattle, hogs, and chickens, as well as several types of plant crops. Transportation includes a dirt road linking the community to the small town of Piñera and the Waspam-Puerto Cabezas road beyond. Dugout canoes are also used for transportation on the Rio Wawa.

=== Redevelopment following Hurricane Felix ===
Awas Tingni was hit severely by Hurricane Felix in 2005; it is the site of several revitalization projects. On the outer edge of town, a model farm has been established, in which people learn how to grow beans, pineapple, manioc, and bananas, as well as the livestock of hogs and chickens, among other crops. It has two sets of solar panels, used to charge batteries in order to power lights in the primary school when meetings are held there at night. The community has two wells, each approximately sixty feet (18 m) deep, and two that are forty feet (12 m) deep, constructed and installed by aid organizations. In addition, many people get their water from the Awas Tingni River.

== Human rights case ==
In the late twentieth century, the Mayagna community sued the Nicaraguan government for rights to their traditional land and its resources. They were in dispute as the government had granted a logging concession to private interests in Mayagna traditional territory without consulting with the people, and despite their complaints and requests to demarcate their land.

In 2001 the people of Awas Tingni won the landmark human rights judgment, a ruling that Nicaragua had violated their rights; the Inter-American Court of Human Rights thus established the right of indigenous communities to their collective land as a basic human right. It was the first such ruling by a court with legally binding authority to rule that a government had violated the rights of indigenous people in their collective land. "The Court found that the right to property, as affirmed in the Inter-American Convention on Human Rights, protects the traditional land tenure of indigenous peoples."

The judgment in Mayagna (Sumo) Community of Awas Tingni v. Nicaragua was made in 2001, but it was not until 2008 that the government of Nicaragua completed the process of surveying and titling the land to the Mayagna. They were assisted by several parties, including the Indigenous Peoples Law & Policy Program of the University of Arizona Law School. Under a 2007 resolution, land which the government illegally granted to veterans of the civil war were to be returned, and the people of Awas Tingni were to receive title to a total of 73,394 hectares (181,360 acres).

As a result of the decision, in 2003 the Nicaraguan National Assembly passed a:

new indigenous land demarcation law.... This law defines a set of rules and procedures for the demarcation of indigenous communal lands in the Atlantic Coast. Nicaraguan officials declared that Awas Tingni would be the first community to have its land titled under the new law. In 2004 the first phase of the demarcation and titling process was completed with a diagnostic study and set of maps documenting the community’s demographics and traditional land tenure.
