= Tuapí =

Village in North Caribbean Coast Autonomous Region, Nicaragua

- Village
- Location in Nicaragua
- Coordinates: 14°06′N 83°20′W
- Country: Nicaragua
- Department: North Caribbean Coast Autonomous Region
- Municipality: Puerto Cabezas

Tuapí is a small indigenous community in the municipality of Puerto Cabezas in the North Caribbean Coast Autonomous Region of Nicaragua.
