= Mining industry of Nicaragua =

Nicaragua is the largest exporter of gold in Central America. Gold was discovered along the northeastern coast in 1880, with the industry becoming privatized in 1994. Unlike in other Central American countries (specifically El Salvador and Guatemala), mining was a non-partisan issue in the 1990s, with both former revolutionary government officials and incoming neo-liberal officials supporting the industry. Incentives from the Nicaraguan government in 2007 to encourage business led to further development of the industry. In more recent years, there have been rapid expansions from international companies, leading to violence against and displacement of Indigenous and Afro-Nicaraguan communities. Since 2020, gold has moved from the country's third largest export to its top export, over coffee, beef and manufactured goods.

== 21st-century mining efforts ==
With the expansion of the Nicaraguan mining industry, companies such as Calibre Mining Corp. from Canada, along with other international corporations, have been gaining land concessions along the coastline of the country. Calibre acquired 11 of the 14 concessions granted in 2022, in total 336,598 hectares, or 3% of the country's total landmass. Specifically between June 2021 and November 2023, land under mining concessions doubled. 1.7 million hectares in total have been granted as part of land concessions, primarily since 2007 under the government of Daniel Ortega.

=== Effects on indigenous communities ===
Many mining land concessions, even if not directly on indigenous lands, have dramatically impacted the communities there. There are 33 mines in the North Caribbean Coast Autonomous Region, in comparison to 10 or less in other Nicaraguan states. Mining in this region affects the Miskito and Mayangna Indigenous communities. To work in these mining projects, Nicaraguans from the western side of the country, called “colonos” (colonists) by those living in the regions affected, move into mining towns. The armed colonists have attempted to force the Indigenous communities off their land—for example, 60% of Mayangna land has been invaded by 5,000 settlers, displacing 3,000.

According to the Oakland Institute, there have been “at least 73 Indigenous people...killed in Nicaragua in cases related to land Invasions” between the beginning of 2020 and ending when their report was published in the beginning of February 2024. Hundreds were threatened, kidnapped, arrested, tortured, or have their homes burned down every year. Activists and witnesses at an Inter-American Commission on Human Rights panel stated that there were 643 cases of such conflict just between January and June 2024. The United Nations Human Rights Office, along with The United States Department of State have pointed to violence towards Indigenous Nicaraguans as a result of mining as a matter of concern. Specifically, the US Department of State in its 2023 report has noted mining as a contributing factor to the increasing violence and threats towards Indigenous Nicaraguans, specifically claiming "logging and mining [to be] in violation of national autonomy laws in the RACS [South Caribbean Coast Autonomous Region] and the RACN [North Caribbean Coast Autonomous Region]".
