= Siuna =

- Municipality
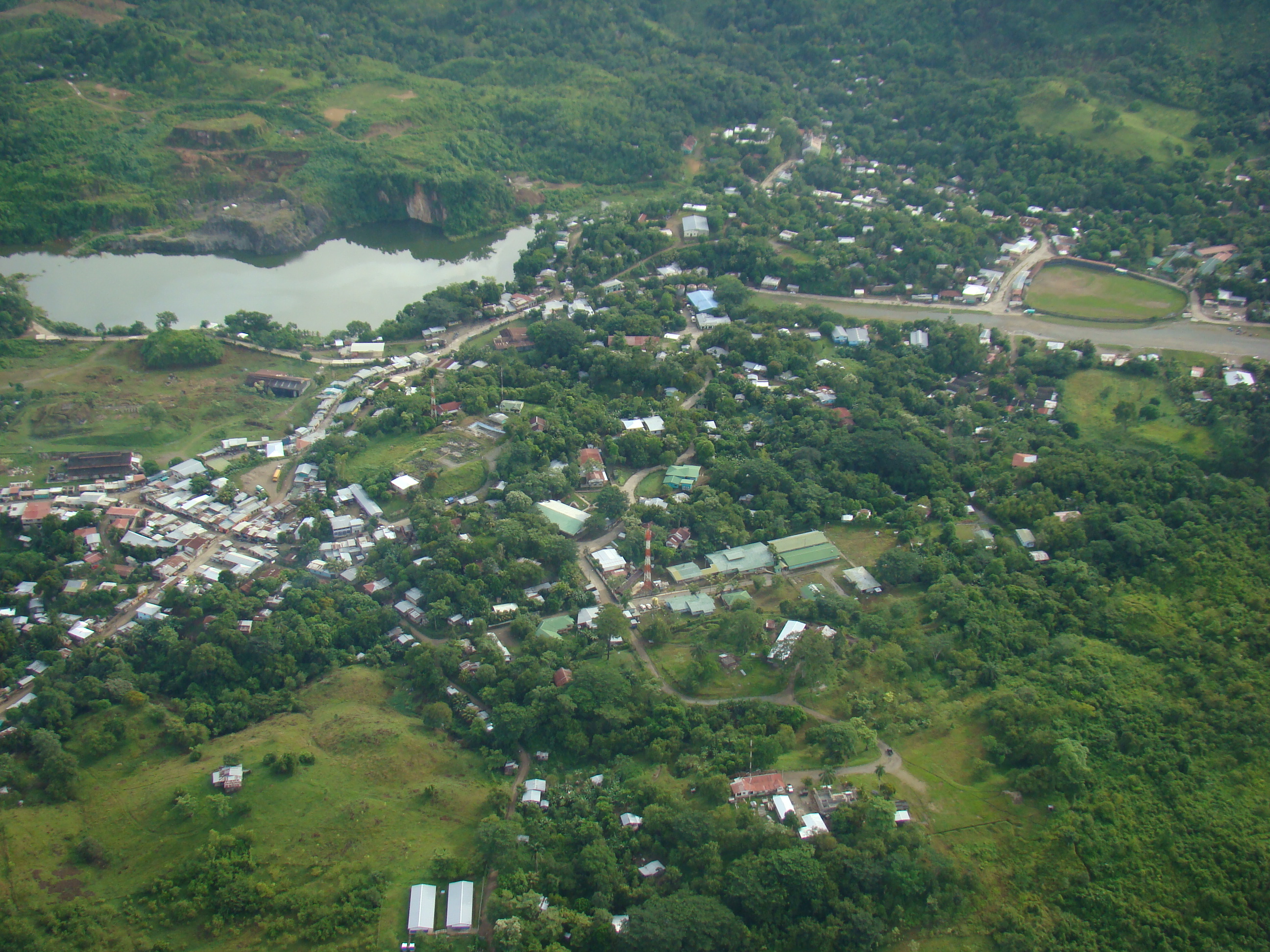
- Aerial view of Siuna on the morning of 20 October 2008

- Location in Nicaragua
- Coordinates: 13°44′N 84°46′W
- Country: Nicaragua
- Department: North Caribbean Autonomous Region

Government
  - Mayor: Onilda Reyes Rocha
  - Vice Mayor: Dr. Noel Espinoza

Area
  - Municipality: 1,321.08 sq mi (3,421.58 km^{2})

Population (2023 estimate)
  - Municipality: 105,233
  - Density: 79.6568/sq mi (30.7557/km^{2})
  - Urban: 25,014
- Time zone: UTC-6 (Central Time)
  - Summer (DST): UTC-6 (No DST)
- Climate: Am

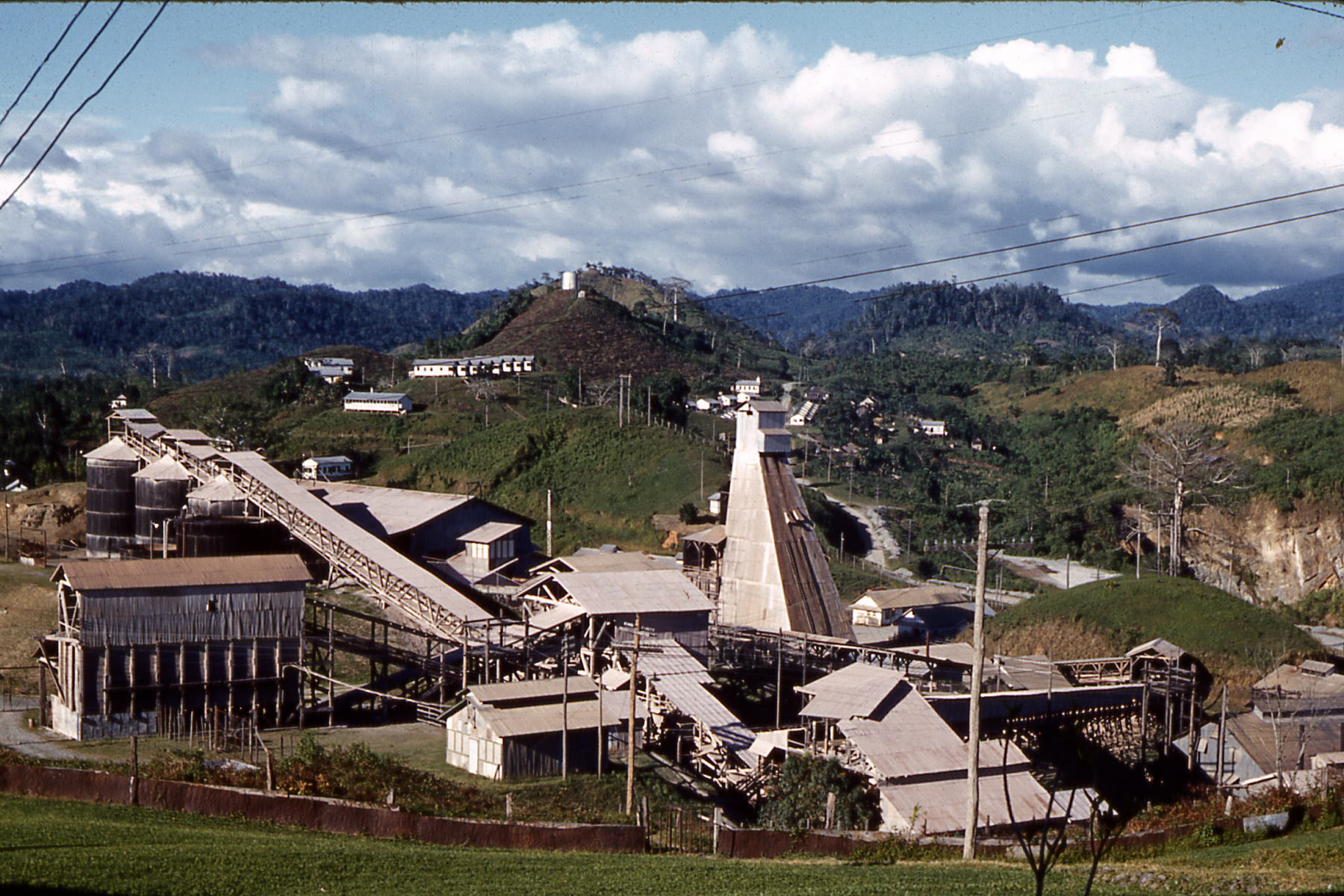
La Luz Gold Mine (ca. 1959), which fueled regional population growth

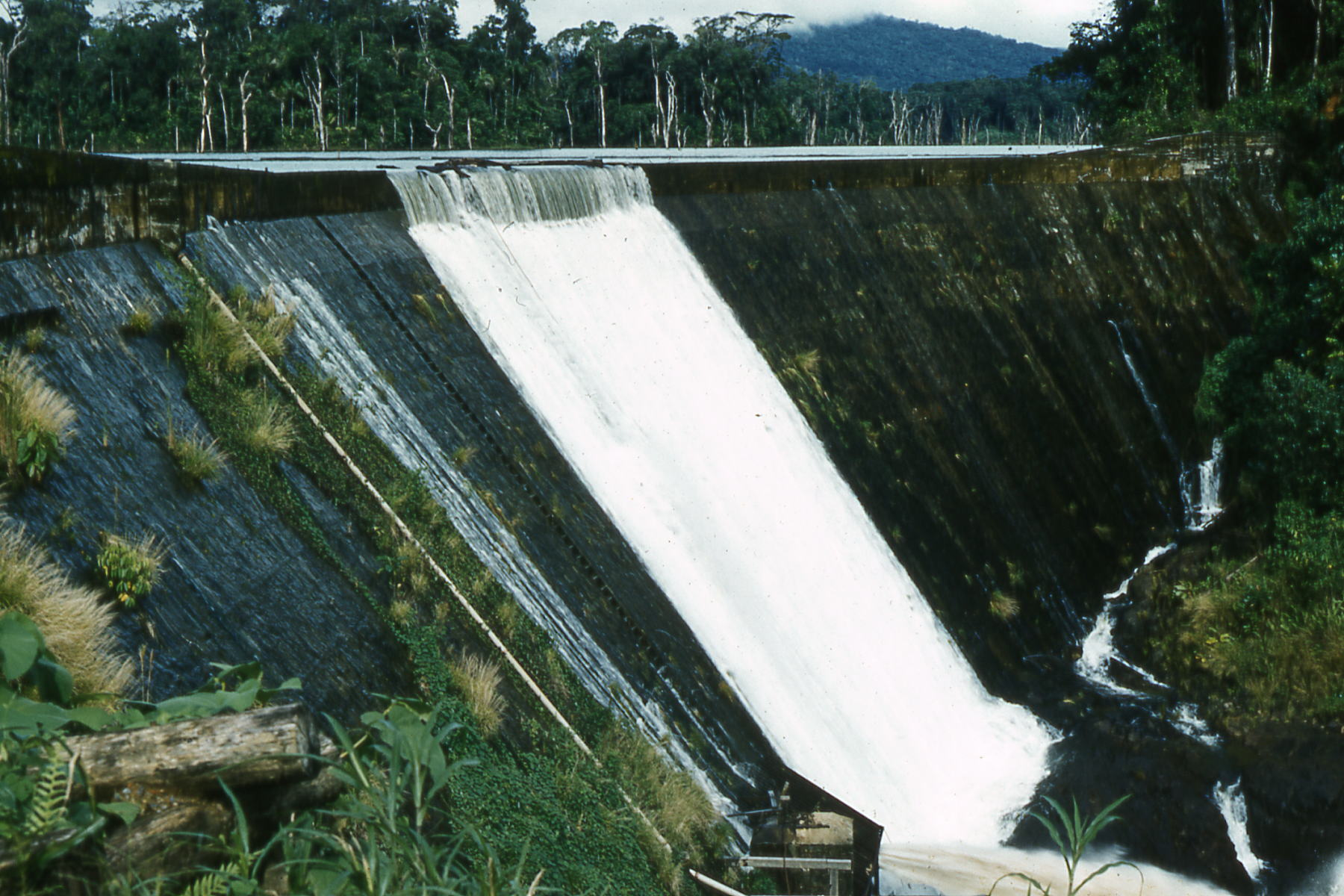
Ei River Dam (ca. 1959) and Ei River Hydro Electric Plant, which supplied all of the hydroelectric power for the mines and region

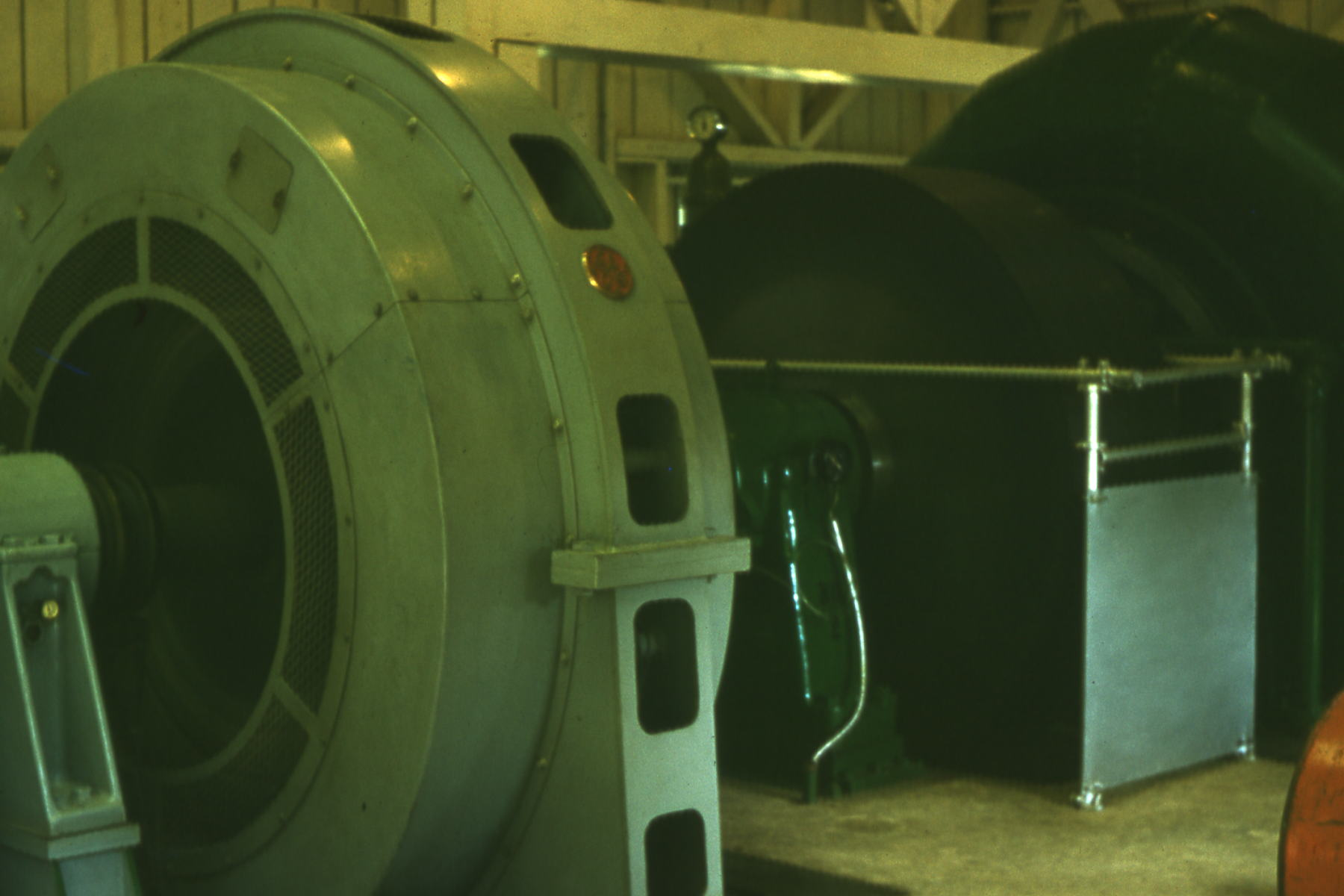
One of the generators in the Ei River Hydro Electric Plant, which supplied all of the hydroelectric power for the mines and region, circa 1959

Siuna is a county-sized administrative municipality in Nicaragua, located approximately 318 kilometres (198 mi) northeast of the capital city of Managua and 218 kilometres (135 mi) west of the coastal city and regional capital Puerto Cabezas in the North Caribbean Autonomous Region (RACN). Siuna is the name of the city as well as the municipality. The municipality of Siuna contains 204 rural communities and 20 neighborhoods. Most were settled in support of gold mining along the Ei River drainage basin, leading to rapid population growth from the mid-1930s.

== Demographics ==
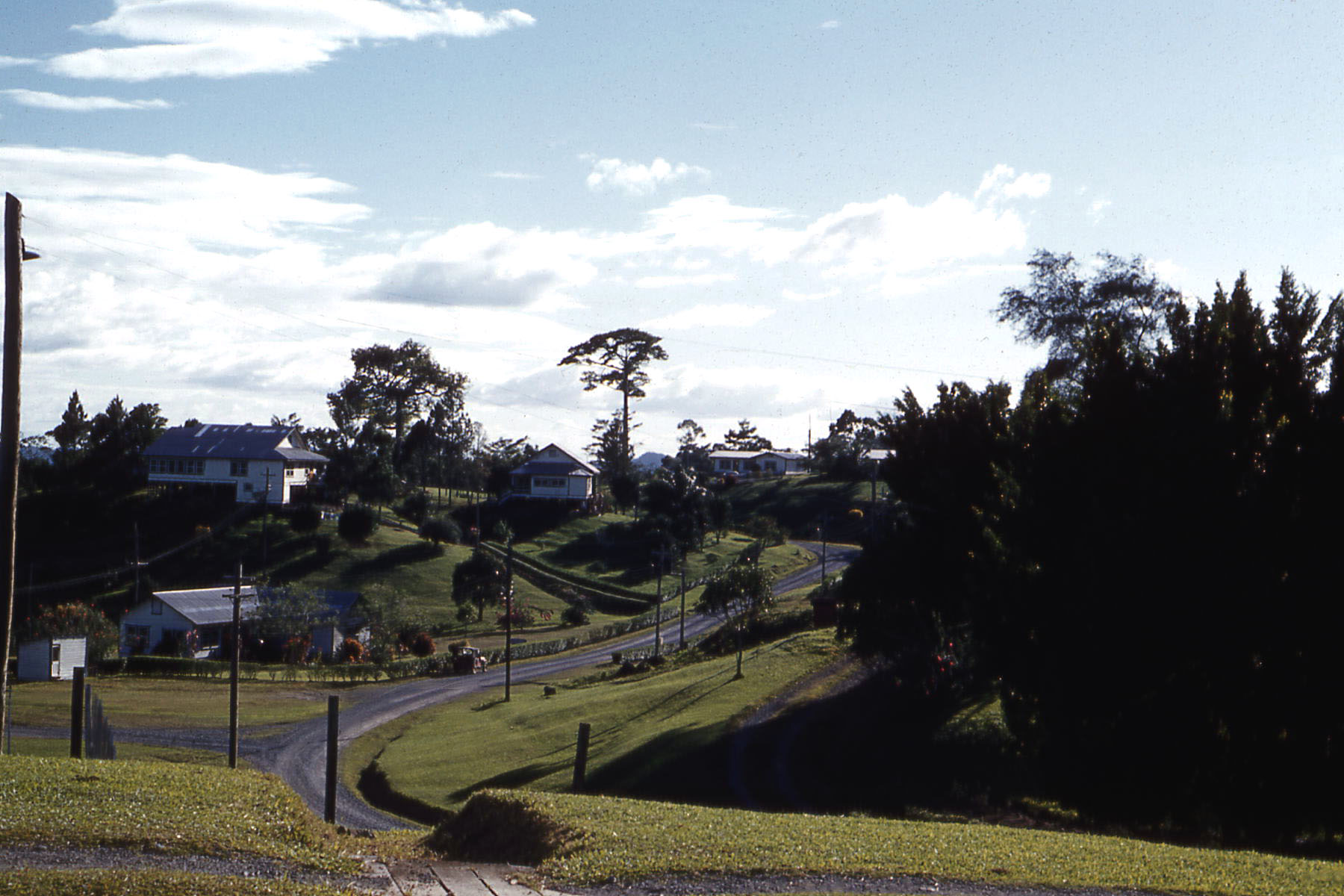
Siuna International housing campus of the La Luz Gold Mine (ca. 1959). The housing complex for international workers overlooks the mine complex of the above photo.

The population of the Siuna municipality varies by information resource and ranges between 97,308 and 100,770 people. 22% of the population, or some 22,856 people, live in the city of Siuna, while approximately 78% of the population, 81,229 people, live in the over 200 rural communities.

There are 20 neighborhoods that originally had names based on the population that lived there during the mining, such as "Moskitown" (where the Miskitos lived) and "Jamaicatown" (where the Creoles lived). Although these names are commonly used, today all neighborhoods have Spanish names.

The population is 99.7% Mestizo, .2% Mayangna, .07% Miskito, and .01% Creole.

== History ==
The town of Siuna was the site of La Luz Mining company, which was active from 1936 to 1968. There was migration from other areas of the country to work in the gold mine during those years, including people from the coast and indigenous groups. The mine was shut down in 1968 due to damage of the hydroelectric plant.

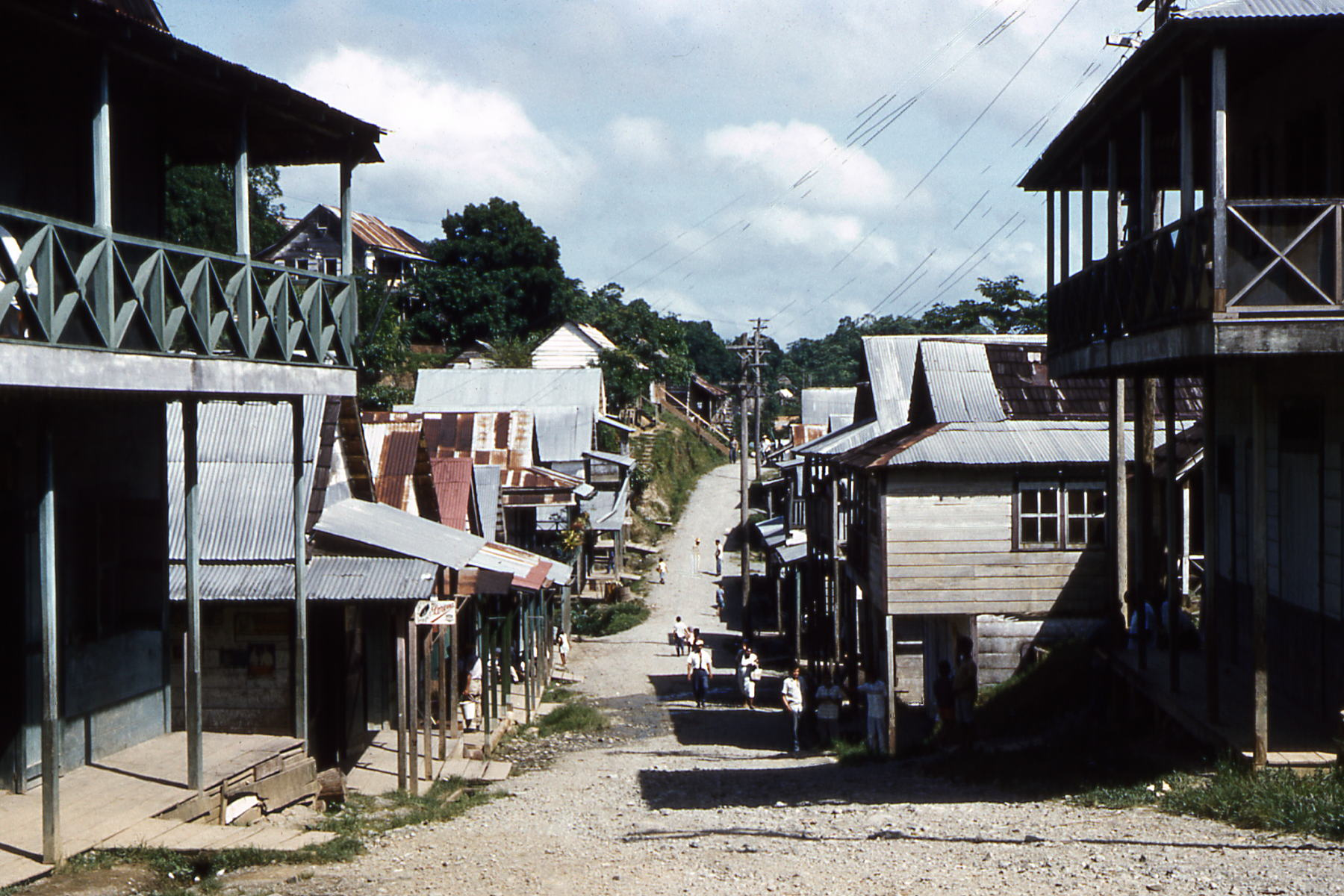
Siuna main street in the late 1950s

Currently, Calibre Mining owns the mine, but it is inactive. The only producing mine in the mining triangle is in Bonanza, and operated through HEMCO.

HEMCO is also active in Siuna through the Javier Chamorro Forestry Project working through Norwegian teak grower NORTEAK.

== Government institutions ==
The following government institutions are present and working in Siuna: MINSA, MARENA, INTA, INAFOR, and as well as the SILAIS office for the RACCN.

== Education ==
There are two universities that offer courses in Siuna. The URACCAN (Universidad de las Regiones Autónomas de la Costa Caribe Nicaragüense) which offer majors in Agro-Forestry and Local Development. The Martin Luther University offers a Nursing degree.

There is a secondary school run through MINED as well as a secondary/primary school run through the parish.

== Economy ==
The majority of the population today are farmers after the closing of the regional gold mining operations. Service businesses and the educational institutions round out the town's employment. The primary crops are beans and corn. There is a greater focus in recent years on cacao production as alternative income. The organization Cacao RAAN works with a number of cooperatives in the region focused on cacao and chocolate production.

=== Bridges to Community ===
The NGO, Bridges to Community, focused on community development and service learning, has an office in Siuna and actively works in two communities, Rosa Grande and Fonseca. Bridges to Community works with the local communities in projects focused on education, health, and economic development. In the area of education, Bridges to Community has most recently built with the community of Rosa Grande a library where now over 400 students in the area go to access literature, research, and study. In the area of health, Bridges to Community has worked most recently with the community of Fonseca in building a water project to benefit 30 houses in addition to the school and chapel. Bridges to Community is also working in digging a well and repairing the distribution system at the MINSA hospital to ensure constant water access in the hospital. Currently in discussion is a joint project involving Bridges to Community, MINSA, US-based Medical Schools, and local health leaders in building and creating a model health care clinic in the region.

Bridges to Community's approach is unique in that the NGO only works in communities that solicit the NGO's support and works with the community on projects that the community wants. In addition the approach focuses not only on construction of projects but of exchange between people and cultures through service learning and reflection.

In 2013 Bridges to Community will begin work in the community of Tadazna.

== Transportation and tourism ==
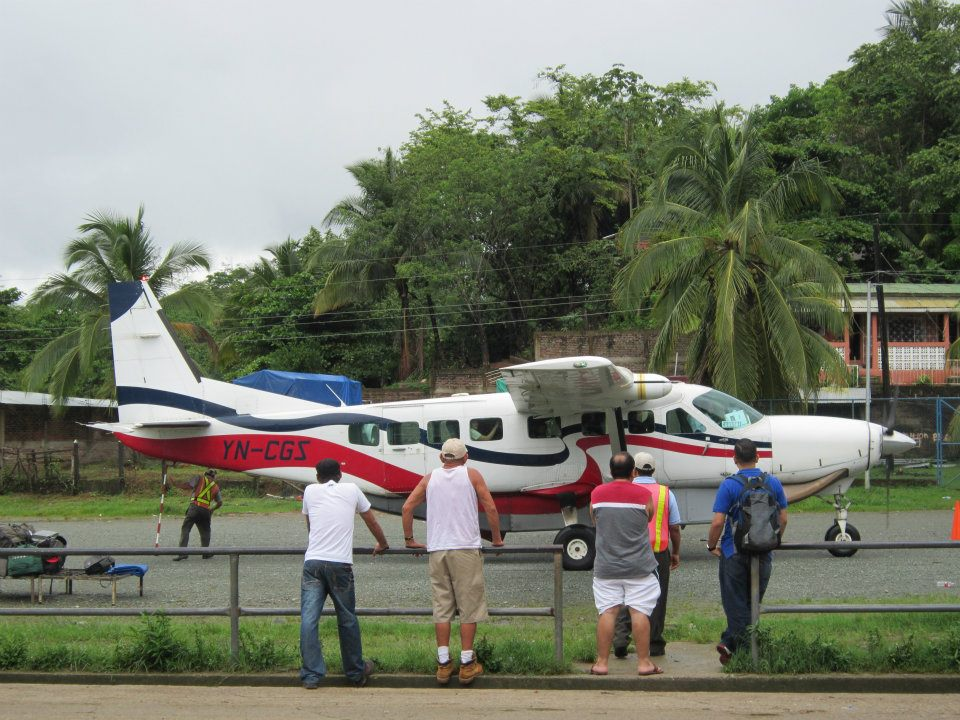
Avianca Nicaragua aircraft at Siuna Airport

Siuna Airport is served by Avianca Nicaragua (La Costeña). The town may be reached by bus on the Managua - Puerto Cabezas Highway or through Waslala on the Matagalpa - Waslala - Siuna road. The bus from Managua to Siuna takes 12 hours through Rio Blanco on the Puerto Cabezas road. Siuna is located 99 kilometres (62 mi) from Waslala and takes about 6 hours by bus.

In town taxis as well as a local bus system provide transportation to the public.
