= RAAN =

RAAN may refer to:

- North Caribbean Coast Autonomous Region, formerly the North Atlantic Autonomous Region (Región Autónoma del Atlántico Norte), in Nicaragua
- Right ascension of the ascending node, one of six orbital elements that define the trajectory of an orbiting body
