= North Caribbean Coast Autonomous Regional Council =

Autonomous Regional Council

- 8th Regional Council

Type
- Type: Unicameral
- Established: 4th may 1990

Structure
- Seats: 45
- Political groups: Government: FSLN (30); Opposition parties: PLC (12); YATAMA (3)

Elections
- Voting system: Party-list proportional representation
- Last election: 2019
- Next election: 2024

Meeting place
- Government House in Puerto Cabezas

The North Caribbean Coast Autonomous Regional Council is the devolved legislature of the North Caribbean Coast Autonomous Region. It has the power to legislate on a wide variety of economic, social, and cultural issues not reserved to the central government.
