= San Pedro Airport (Nicaragua) =

- IATA: BZA; ICAO: MNBZ

Summary
- Airport type: Public
- Operator: Republica de Nicaragua
- Serves: Bonanza
- Elevation AMSL: 600 ft / 183 m
- Coordinates: 14°02′10″N 084°37′30″W

Map
- Location in Nicaragua

Runways
Direction	Length		Surface
Direction	m	ft	Surface
18/36	1,400	4,593	Dirt
- Sources: Google Maps GCM

San Pedro Airport (IATA: BZA, ICAO: MNBZ) is an airport that serves Bonanza, Nicaragua.

The airport was very important to the establishment of gold mining operations in the 1940s and 1950s.

== See also ==
- Transport in Nicaragua
- List of airports in Nicaragua
