= Mayangna people =

Ethnic group native to Nicaragua and Honduras

Mayangna
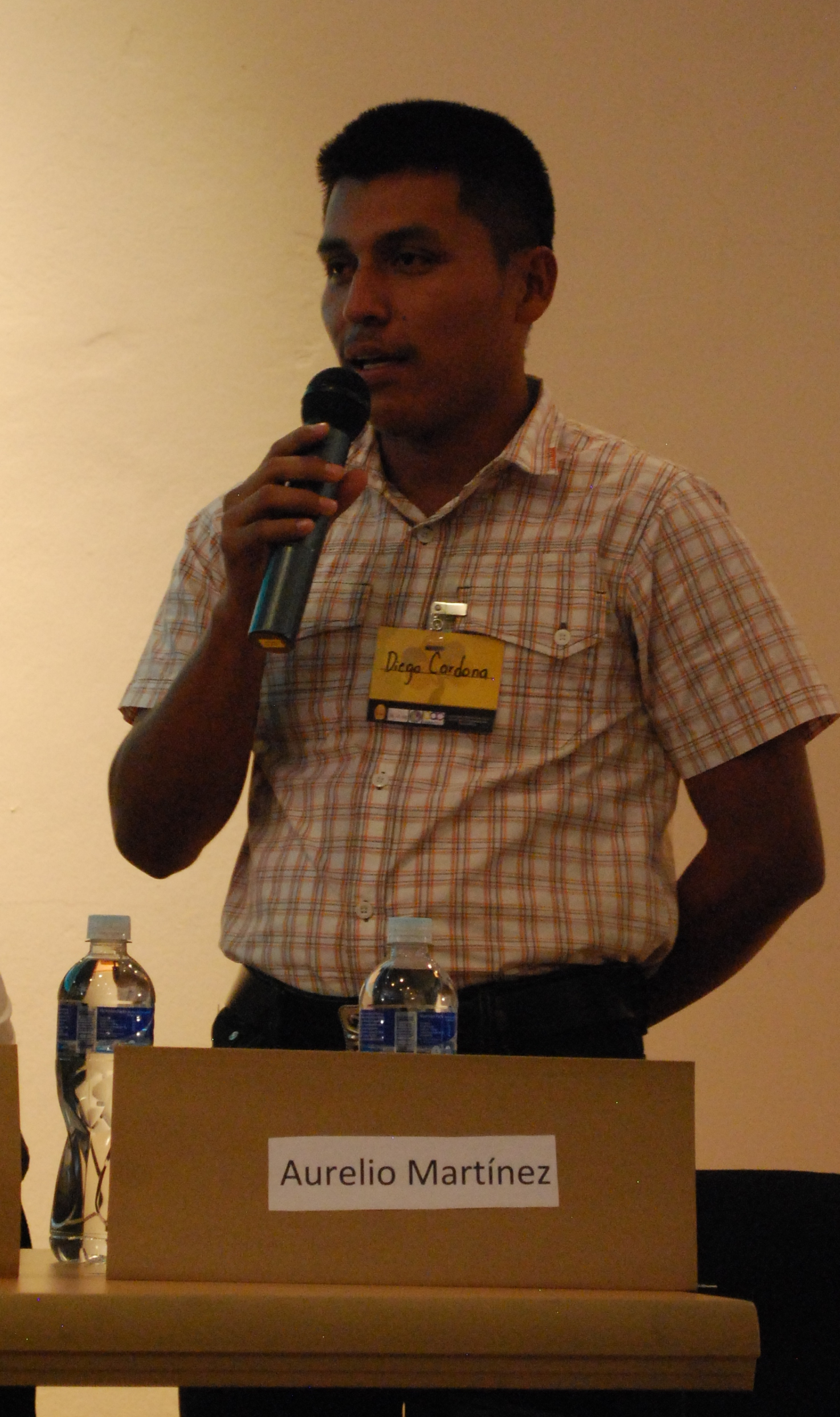
- Aurelio Martinez representing the Tawahka subgroup of the Sumo people in Honduras at a conference at the Universidad Nacional Autónoma de Honduras.

Total population
- 27,000

Regions with significant populations
- Nicaragua; Honduras

Languages
- Panamahka, Tawahka, Ulwa, Spanish, Miskito

Religion
- Christianity

Related ethnic groups
- Cacaopera, Miskito

The Mayangna (/məˈjæŋnə/ mə-YANG-nə), also known as the Ulwa, are an Indigenous people who live on the eastern coasts of Nicaragua and Honduras, an area commonly known as the Mosquito Coast. They are sometimes referred to as the Sumu (or Sumo), a derogatory name historically used by the Miskito people. Their culture is closer to that of the indigenous peoples of Costa Rica, Panama, and Colombia, than to the Mesoamerican cultures to the north. The Mayangna inhabited much of the Mosquito Coast in the 16th century. Since then, they have become more marginalized following the emergence of the Miskito as a regional power.

== Distribution ==
The Mayangna today are divided into the Panamahka, Tawahka and Ulwa ethno-linguistic subgroups. They live primarily in remote settlements on the rivers Coco, Waspuk, Pispis and Bocay in north-eastern Nicaragua, as well as on the Patuca across the border in Honduras and far to the south along the Río Grande de Matagalpa. The isolation of these communities has allowed the Mayagna to preserve their language and culture away from the assimilatory impulses of both the larger Miskito group, who live closer to the Atlantic coastline, and the ‘Spaniards’ (as the Mayangna still refer to the Spanish-speaking Mestizos who form the ethnic majority population of Nicaragua), who are for the most part confined to the larger towns in the region that the Mayangna inhabit.

The Ulwa community in Nicaragua is an integral part of the Mayagna, Panamahka, and Ulwa family. They are predominantly located in the Karawala settlement within the Rio Grande basin of Matagalpa. Established since 1853, this indigenous group holds great significance, comprising approximately 3500 individuals.

== History ==
=== Early history ===
The evidence provided by an analysis of the Misumalpan language family, to which the Mayangna languages belong and which also includes Miskito and the extinct Matagalpan and Cacaopera tongues once spoken in the Nicaraguan highlands and southern El Salvador, indicates the continuous presence of these groups in the region from around 2000BC. In fact, until the migration from southern Mexico of tribes speaking Oto-Manguean languages who arrived on the Pacific Coast of Nicaragua in the ninth century AD and the Nahua groups from even further north that followed, Misumalpan languages were probably spoken across the whole of Nicaragua.

In the seventeenth century the British, rather than the Spaniards, established a presence in the eastern regions of what are now Nicaragua and Honduras. When they arrived on the Caribbean coast in the 1630s, it appears that the Mayangna were divided into at least nine different sub-tribes, whose territories stretched from the southern Atlantic Coast far into the interior of Nicaragua, as evidenced by the preponderance of Mayangna-language place-names that survive across this region. But it was a different indigenous group who profited from friendly contact with the new European arrivals. Sometimes posited as a coastal-dwelling Mayangna sub-tribe, but given their distinctive language more likely to have been a related Misumalpan group, the Miskito people, who appear to have originally lived on the northern Atlantic Coast around Cabo Gracias a Dios, are an interesting example of people who grew through culture-contact on the Coast, and whose ethnic identity and even racial composition is intimately intertwined with their position as intermediaries in the relations between the Europeans and the other Indigenous living in the region, who also included the Pech and the now much reduced but previously widespread Rama in the far south.

=== The Miskito Kingdom ===
The Miskito acquired firearms as a result of their lucrative trading arrangements with the Europeans, and through their position as allies of the British in their prolonged conflict with the Spanish. The Mayangna tribes and the Miskito had always raided as well as traded with one another, but the new weapons tipped the local balance of power firmly in the direction of the latter. Miskito raids into the interior carried away increasing numbers of (primarily Mayangna) captives, of whom the women were kept and the men sold on to the British to work the growing Jamaican plantations. Augmented by this new influx of women into their communities, as well as by the absorption of escaped or ship-wrecked African slaves, the Miskito population boomed and this formerly small tribe soon emerged as the politically and demographically dominant local power, a fact already acknowledged by the British in 1660 when they crowned a chieftain called Oldman as the ‘Miskito King,’ recognising him and his descendants as the legitimate authorities on the coast.

In the eighteenth century the Spanish managed to penetrate the central Nicaraguan highlands, where they converted and permanently settled many of the indigenous Matagalpas. However, these attempts were made difficult by the resistance of the neighbouring Mayangna groups who constantly raided the new communities, sometimes in conjunction with Miskito war parties. In the same period, the Mayangna themselves also increasingly succumbed to the better-armed Miskito raiders, and began a steady retreat into the interior, towards the headwaters of the rivers along which most of the groups had originally lived. Contrary to the assumptions of some scholars, this did not mean that the Mayangna totally cut themselves off from the outside world, and while those who remained in coastal areas were often forced to pay tribute to the Miskito King, even the more isolated Mayangna communities formed an integral part of regional trading networks, and through their access to the highest quality tropical hardwoods controlled the production and sale of the canoes that -ironically - were used against them by the Miskito in their slaving expeditions.

=== Early twentieth century ===
The Mayangna population continued to decline after the British gave up their claim to the Mosquito Coast in 1860, due to the combined effects of disease, internecine warfare, and assimilationist pressures from both Miskito and the new Nicaraguan state. From a possible pre-contact total of more than 30,000, by 1862 only around 5-6000 remained. The final blow for the Mayangna came at the beginning of the twentieth century with their conversion to Christianity, a task undertaken by missionaries from the Moravian Church, who arrived in the region from Germany in 1847 but only began to make a real impact on the native population after the departure of the British. During the so-called ‘Great Awakening’ of the 1880s much of the Miskito population converted to the new faith en masse, and buoyed by this success the Moravians increasingly turned their attention to the Mayangna. Just as the Catholic missionaries of the colonial era had done throughout the Spanish Empire, this first involved persuading the Mayangna, who up to this point had lived in dispersed family groupings and had continued to observe a traditional and often semi-nomadic lifestyle based on hunting, fishing and a shifting agriculture, to come together and settle permanently in new, compact and accessible communities, centred around a church.

This disruption of their old lifestyle had a negative effect on the Mayangnas' attachment to many aspects of their traditional culture, while the proximity of the new settlements to Miskito communities, and the missionaries’ policy of preaching the Gospel and teaching literacy only in the Miskito language brought the Mayangna into increased contact with both the Miskito themselves and with Miskito culture in general. This increased the tendency of Mayangna individuals to try to shed their original identity either by marrying out of the group or by abandoning their original language in order to move higher within the Coastal ethnic hierarchy, in which the Miskito had a higher position, and by the mid-twentieth century many of the new communities founded by Mayangna converts, such as Quamwatla, Prinzubila and Bikbila, regarded themselves as wholly Miskito. Meanwhile, for those who still regarded themselves as Mayangna, the new religion became a key part of their identity, and the Moravian Church replaced the old hold of the chieftains and sukias (traditional healers) on Mayangna life.

The arrival in the region of rebel general Augusto Sandino's guerrilla forces in the 1920s caused even the most remote Mayangna communities to become embroiled in the conflict, and Mayangna men appear to have been in high demand from both Sandino's men and the Marines as guides and boatmen, and even as fighters: a description of the Sandinista raiders who blew up the La Luz mine in 1928 notes that “among their number were several Sumu armed with shotguns and machetes.” But the biggest threat to the Mayangna in the first half of the twentieth century was the loss of lands to mestizo settlers from Western Nicaragua, and destruction and theft of Mayangna natural resources. The rising price of copper meant the opening of a new mine at Rosita in 1959, which by 1970 had generated 40-50 million dollars for its American owners. But the discharge of toxic waste products into the local rivers devastated the ecosystems that the Mayangna communities traditionally depended on for their food supply. In Wasakin, only a few miles downriver from Rosita, these also caused “stomach pains, vomiting, vomiting blood, fevers, headaches and coughing” in those who bathed in or drank the water, eventually resulting in the deaths of up to three children a day in January and February 1979.

=== Revolution and civil war ===
The Nicaraguan Revolution heralded sudden and dramatic change on the Atlantic Coast, which had long been an internal colony of Somoza's Pacific-oriented Nicaraguan state, which exploited the region's resources but otherwise neglected it. Proclaiming as one of their primary targets the ‘integration’ of the Atlantic Coast, the Sandinistas dramatically increased the presence of the State in the most remote corners of the region. Early Mayangna experiences of the Revolution were largely positive, as new roads and clinics were built and the Sandinista-led 'Literacy Crusade', which eventually included teaching in local native languages, led to many Mayangna learning to read and write – 1,449 according to a government report – and the birth of Mayangna itself as a written language.

However, after fighting broke out between the Sandinista state and Miskito, some Mayangna, under pressure from two seemingly neutral institutions dominated by the Miskito - the Moravian Church and MISURASATA, both of which had come to play an important part in Mayangna cultural and political life - joined the Miskito guerrilla forces, prompting the Sandinistas to arrest Mayangna leaders and occupy various Mayangna communities. More than 3000 Mayangna - around half of the total Mayangna population - subsequently fled to squalid refugee camps in Honduras, where many were then drafted (often forcibly) into MISURA, the main Miskito guerrilla force. Many of those remaining in Nicaragua were then moved by the Sandinista government from their homes - now in the midst of a war zone - to equally unsanitary camps in the interior of the country.

Perceived mistreatment by both the Miskito leadership and lower-ranking Miskito ‘comrades’ generated serious discontent amongst the Mayangna guerrillas, and in 1983, the most important Mayangna rebel commander, Ampinio Palacios, decided to leave MISURA with his men and go over to the FDN with around two-hundred other Mayangna troops. Most other Mayangna guerrillas deserted soon after, but they faced serious threats from MISURA which, angered and worried by the desertions, tried to forcibly recruit the reluctant Mayangna back into its ranks.

For the Mayangna, an escape from the conflict was only possible after a genuine shift occurred in the Sandinistas’ own nationalist ideology, which moved beyond a purely rhetorical acceptance of the ‘differences’ on the Coast towards a practical commitment to embrace them as part of the process of constructing a new society. After President Daniel Ortega announced in December 1984 that the Sandinistas would recognize the Atlantic Coast's right to autonomy, the Mayangna ethnic organisation SUKALWALA began direct negotiations with Tomás Borge, the head of the Northern Zelaya Autonomy Commission, and won the exemption of the Mayangna from the draft. Soon after, in April 1985, the recently elected Assemblea Nacional passed an amnesty decree, proposed by Mayangna leader Ronas Dolores Green amongst others, which specifically covered 'miskitos, sumos, ramas y creoles.' This helped to restore Mayangna trust in the Sandinistas, and paved the way for the return to Nicaragua of the Mayangna refugees and ex-combatants in Honduras, harassed there as they were by the Miskito.

=== Autonomy ===
In the Mayangna language, ‘autonomy’ translates as “alas yalahnin lani” – ‘to live our system of life.” However, the current autonomous political system, in the eyes of the Mayanga, feel that they are scaught between the advancing ‘agricultural frontier’ of mestizo peasants, on the one side, and on the other, the Miskito leaders, who portray themselves as representatives of all of the indigenous of the Coast. The Mayangna look to the Sandinista-run central government as their ally, and that the gradual progress of territorial demarcation and the titling of lands that has taken place under the Ortega government will eventually usher in autonomy for the Mayangna.

In 2001 the Mayagna of the small community of Awas Tingni (then 1100 people) won an important ruling from the Inter-American Court of Human Rights, established in 1979 by agreement among the signatories of the Organization of American States (OAS). The ruling established that indigenous peoples had rights to the land where they had traditionally lived and had tenure.

However, problems with the land continue, and in Wasakin (a Mayangna community near Rosita) a state of violent confrontation between the Mayangna and invading Mestizos has led to the killing of a rancher and the subsequent murder of two young indigenous.

== Mayangna language ==
The indigenous groups previously known collectively as the 'Sumu' have never spoken a single, unified language. The language spoken around Rosita and Bonanza in the north-eastern part of the RAAN, and today known as 'Mayangna', is in fact two closely related dialects, Twahka and Panamahka. Meanwhile the Ulwa people of Karawala in the RAAS, who were also formerly regarded as 'Sumu', speak a closely related sister-language called Ulwa. Both languages belong to the Misumalpan language family. The name "ulwa" was mentioned for the first time in 1586, with different spellings: oldwe, ulwa, ulba, wulwa, woolwa, ulúa.

Today, most people speak Mayangna at home but can also speak Miskito in order to interact with the communities around them, and the existence of the Ulwa language is regarded as increasingly threatened by this shift to Miskito.

== See also ==
- The community of Awas Tingni
- The community of Krausirpi
