= November 2001 Atlantic Canada storm complex =

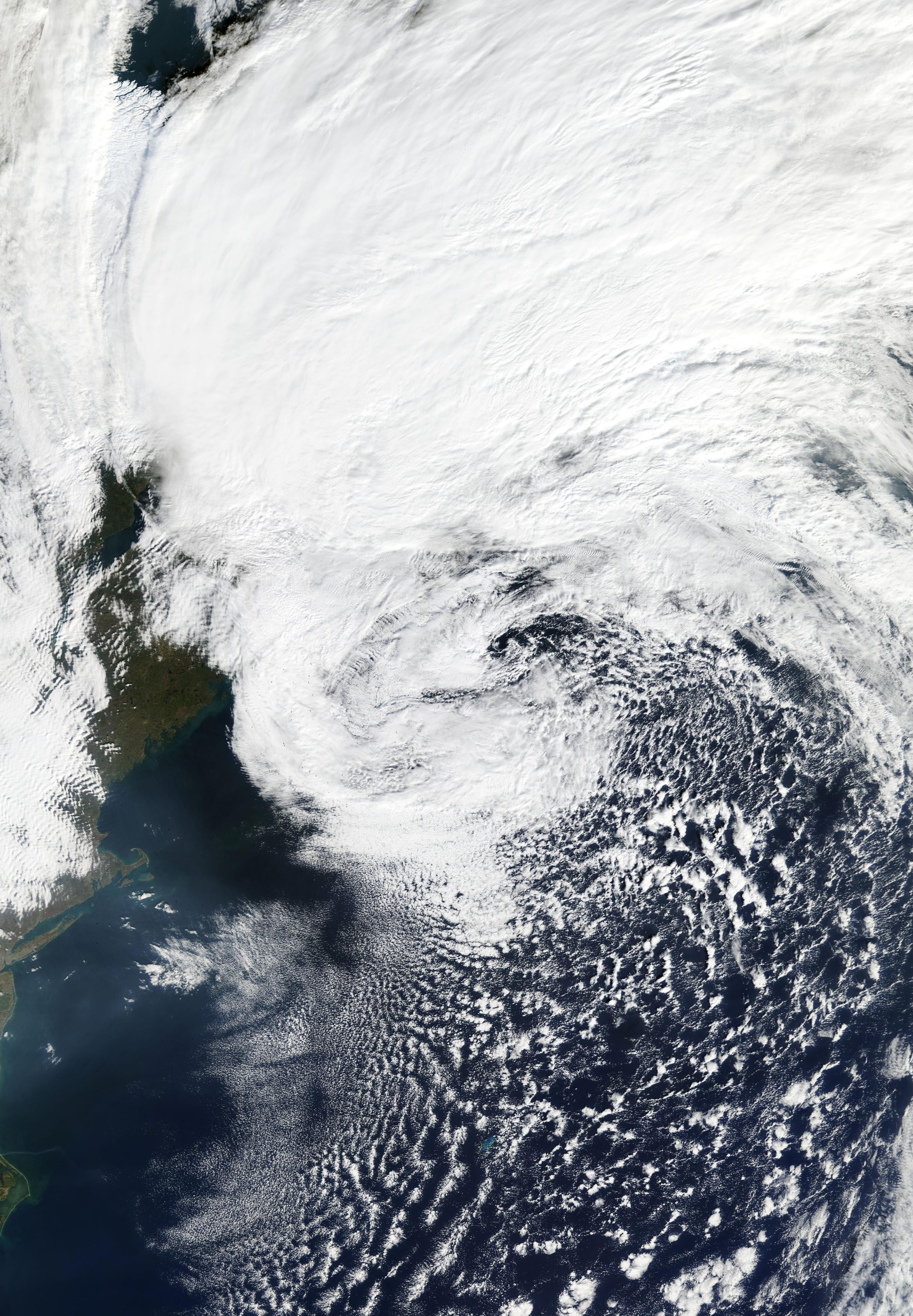
- The extratropical cyclone on November 7

Extratropical cyclone
- Highest gusts: 154 km/h (96 mph) at Confederation Bridge, Prince Edward Island
- Lowest pressure: 946 hPa (mbar); 27.94 inHg

The November 2001 Atlantic Canada storm complex was a powerful coastal storm that included the remnants of North Atlantic hurricanes Michelle and Noel. The low intensified as it moved westward into Atlantic Canada on November 6, reaching a minimum pressure of 946 hPa (27.9 inHg). The storm turned to the northeast and emerged into the Atlantic Ocean on November 8. It produced strong winds throughout Atlantic Canada, including gusts of up to 154 km/h (96 mph) at the Confederation Bridge in Prince Edward Island. High waves caused damage along the coastlines, while high winds left up to 100,000 without power. Overall damage was minor, and no casualties were reported.

== Meteorological history ==
On November 6, an extratropical storm located south of Newfoundland absorbed the remnants of Hurricane Noel. The extratropical storm previously absorbed Hurricane Michelle, and was moving quickly northeastward. The storm complex moved over Newfoundland, intensifying and producing strong winds throughout Atlantic Canada. It exited into the Atlantic Ocean on November 8.

== Preparations and impact ==
Prior to the passage of the storm, wind warnings were issued in Newfoundland, and throughout the island ferry service was suspended. Ferry service was also canceled in Nova Scotia and Prince Edward Island. Throughout Canada, the storm complex produced powerful winds throughout Atlantic Canada, leaving 100,000 Canadians without power. Environment Canada described the system as one of the top 10 weather events in Canada in 2001.

Winds in Nova Scotia from the storm complex reached 50 mph (80 km/h) in inland areas, while areas near the coast experienced gusts of over 62 mph (100 km/h). The peak wind gust in the province was 93 mph (150 km/h) along Cape George. Strong winds persisted across the province for 19 hours. The storm complex produced 26 to 30-ft (nine to ten m) waves along the eastern and northern coasts of Nova Scotia. The storm surge, which occurred at high tide, reached two ft (0.6 m), eroding a section of the Canso Causeway. The causeway was closed when a trailer overturned from the high winds. Around 1.6 inches (41 mm) of precipitation fell, causing flooding and downed trees. Overall, about 70,000 people in Nova Scotia were left without power.

In New Brunswick, the storm complex produced high winds with gusts of up to 84 mph (135 km/h). The winds downed several trees and power lines which resulted in power outages, with Fredericton being the hardest hit. About 16,000 were without power on the day after the storm struck. The storm produced sustained winds of 76 mph (122 km/h) and gusts to 96 mph (154 km/h) at the Confederation Bridge. There, the wind gust was the highest ever recorded, resulting in the bridge being closed for five hours, the first time the bridge was closed in its history. Waves of up to 30 ft (nine m) in height with a storm surge of over 3.3 ft (one m) hit the northern coastline of Prince Edward Island. Every wharf and many coastal roads from Rustico to East Point were under water from the high waves and storm surge. The winds left much of eastern Prince Edward Island without power.

In Newfoundland, the system produced over four in (100 mm) of rain and strong winds. Many areas reported over 55 mph (89 km/h), with gusts peaking at 84 mph (135 km/h) at Channel-Port aux Basques. Coastal areas of the island reported storm surges of around two ft (0.6 m). The strong winds of the storm destroyed the windows of six vehicles and blew off most of the roof of a truck in Holyrood, with the debris damaging a nearby weather radar. Cold air behind the storm complex produced snow across the island.

== See also ==
- List of Canada hurricanes
- Nor'easter
- White Juan
