= Prinzapolka =

- Municipality
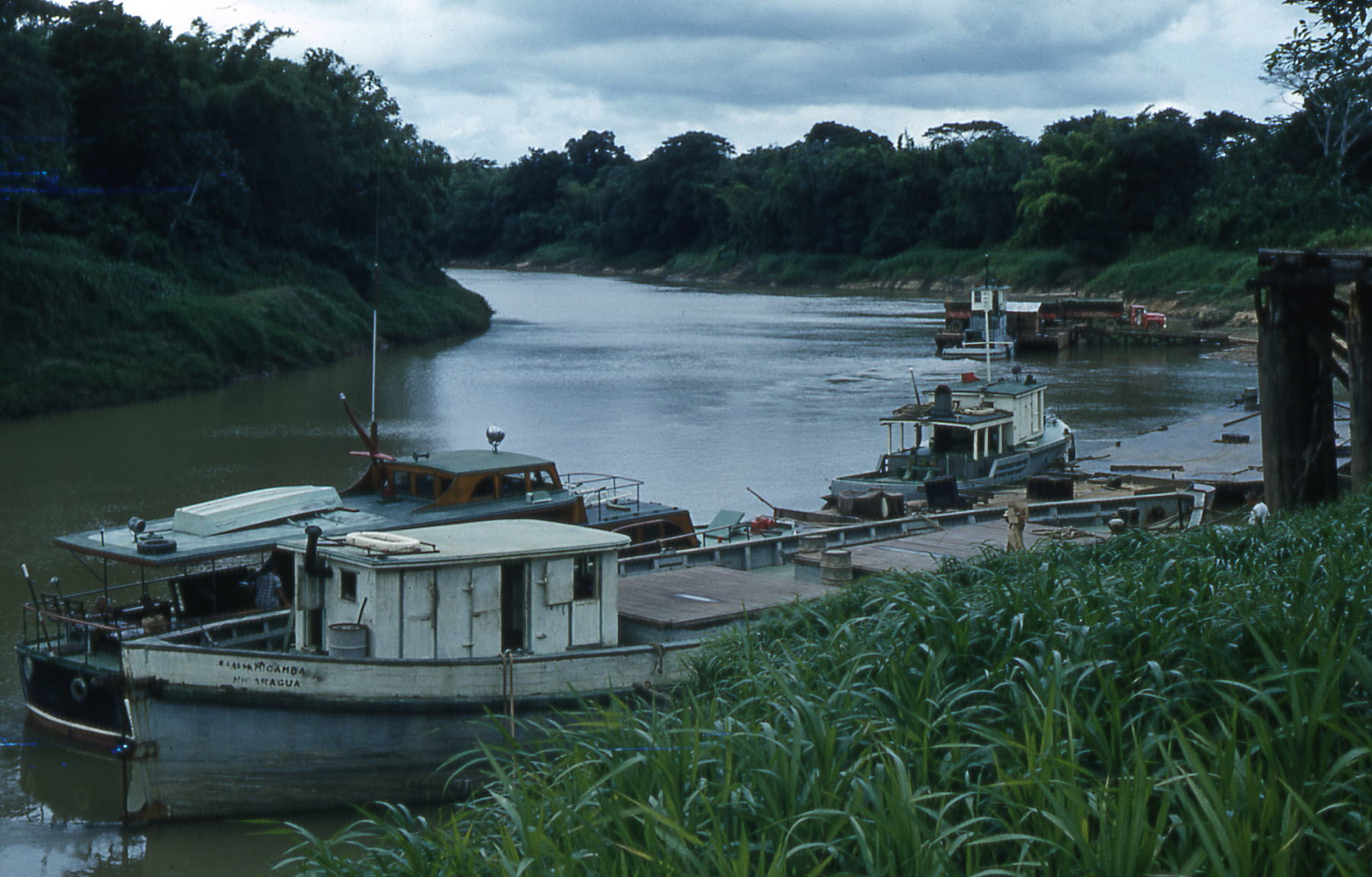
- Town of Alamikamba at the shores of the Prinzapolka River

- Location in Nicaragua
- Coordinates: 13°24′N 83°34′W
- Country: Nicaragua
- Department: North Caribbean Coast Autonomous Region

Area
  - Municipality: 7,020.48 km^{2} (2,710.62 sq mi)

Population (2023 estimate)
  - Municipality: 46,730
  - Density: 6.656/km^{2} (17.24/sq mi)
  - Urban: 8,638
- Time zone: UTC-6 (Central Time)
  - Summer (DST): UTC-6 (No DST)
- Climate: Af

Prinzapolka (Spanish pronunciation: [pɾinsaˈpolka]) is a Miskito municipality in the North Caribbean Coast Autonomous Region of Nicaragua.

Prinzapolka (sometimes spelled Prinzapolca) is also an important river and river basin in the Caribbean Coast Region of Nicaragua.

== Language ==
Miskito language is dominant in the region, followed by Mayangna and Spanish.

== Culture ==
Since Prinzapolka is a Miskito municipality, Miskito culture is dominant, but there are also Latinos and Mayangnas.
