= Waslala =

- Municipality
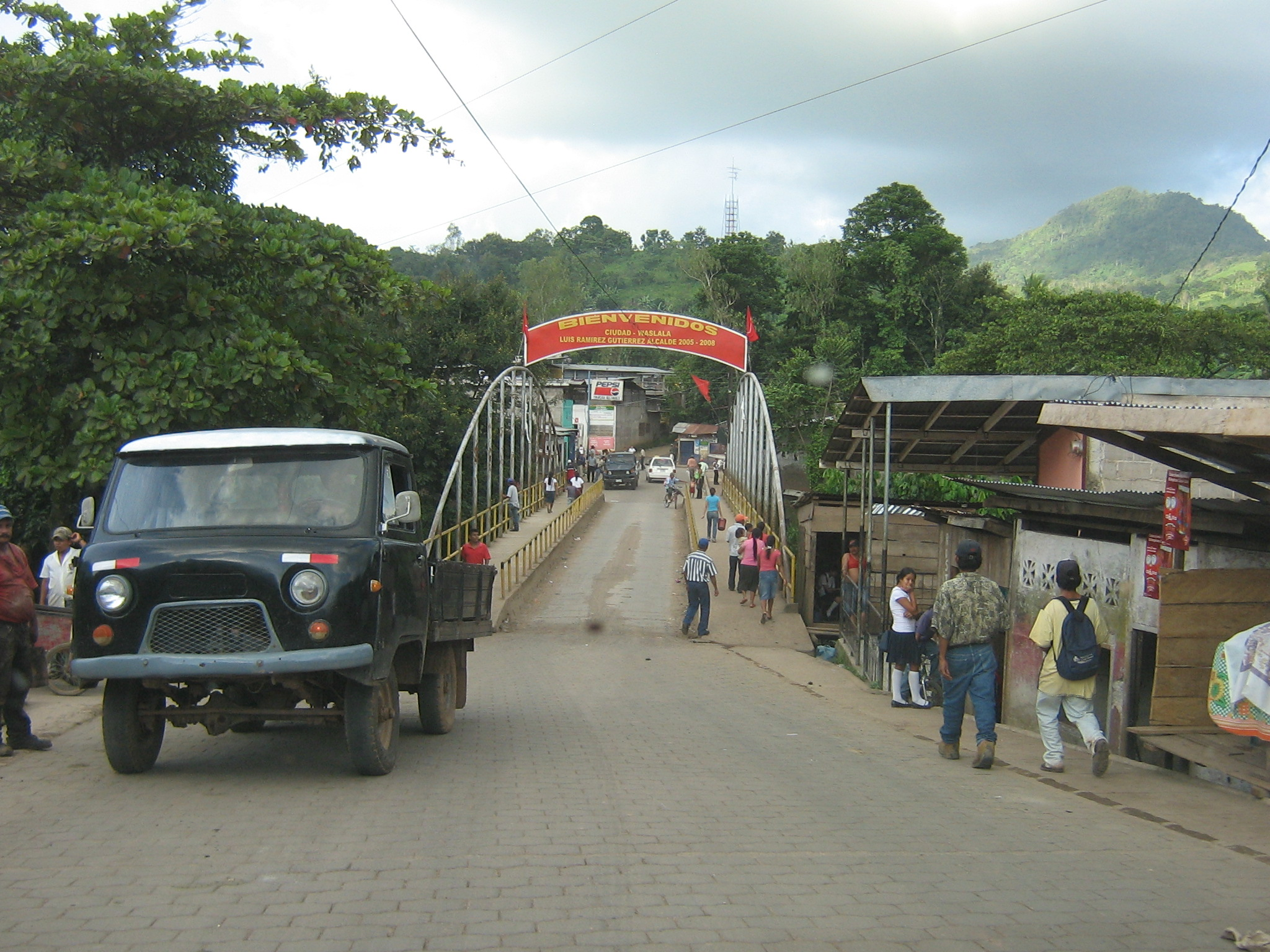
- Bridge and entrance to the city of Waslala in 2008.

- Location in Nicaragua
- Coordinates: 13°19′58″N 85°22′18″W
- Country: Nicaragua
- Region: North Caribbean Coast Autonomous Region

Area
  - Municipality: 513.33 sq mi (1,329.51 km^{2})

Population (2023 estimate)
  - Municipality: 77,690
  - Density: 151.3/sq mi (58.44/km^{2})
  - Urban: 19,109
- Time zone: UTC-6 (Central Time)
  - Summer (DST): UTC-6 (No DST)
- Climate: Am

Waslala is a town and a municipality in the North Caribbean Coast Autonomous Region of Nicaragua. It is located 71 miles from Matagalpa and 161 miles from Managua.

The Nicaraguan Revolution affected Waslala tremendously - it was the location of many guerrilla fights. The city has electricity, television and cable service, and cell phone service. Few of the 95 outlying communities have electricity or running water although some business owners have generators for limited power supplies.

Many organizations are working in Waslala to help the community build the local economy and improve the health of the people that live there including Water for Waslala and Pigs for Kids.

== Climate ==
Waslala has a tropical climate and two seasons - wet and dry.

== Landscape ==
Waslala and the surrounding areas are covered with vegetation, have water-filled rivers and streams and offer scenic views of the forests and countryside. Nicaragua's deforestation did hit Waslala where farmers cut down many trees to make way for farms.
