= Waspam =

Waspam Waspán (Spanish)
- Municipality
- Location in Nicaragua
- Coordinates: 14°44′N 83°58′W
- Country: Nicaragua
- Department: North Caribbean Coast Autonomous Region

Area
  - Municipality: 3,606.85 sq mi (9,341.71 km^{2})

Population (2023 estimate)
  - Municipality: 62,878
  - Density: 17.433/sq mi (6.7309/km^{2})
  - Urban: 14,211
- Time zone: UTC-6 (Central Time)
  - Summer (DST): UTC-6 (No DST)
- Climate: Am

Waspam (Spanish: Waspán, Spanish pronunciation: [wasˈpam]) is a Miskito town and a municipality in the North Caribbean Coast Autonomous Region of Nicaragua.

== Language ==
The regional official language is Miskito, but English, Mayangna and Spanish are also spoken in the region.

== Culture ==
The dominant culture is Miskito, followed by Mayangna and a very few Latinos.

== Miskito pine forest ==
A large area of Miskito pine forest is found in Waspam.

== Rivers ==
Waspam has more rivers then any other region of Central America and more them are non polluted. Wangki is the longest river of Central America and it's located in Waspam.
