= North Caribbean Coast Autonomous Region =

Autonomous region of Nicaragua

North Caribbean Coast Autonomous Region Región Autónoma de la Costa Caribe Norte (Spanish)
- Autonomous region
- Flag Coat of arms

- Location of the North Caribbean Autonomous Region in Nicaragua.
- Coordinates: 14°01′41″N 83°22′51″W
- Country: Nicaragua
- Capital: Puerto Cabezas
- Seat: Puerto Cabezas
- Municipalities: List: Bonanza; Mulukukú; Prinzapolka; Puerto Cabezas; Rosita; Siuna; Waslala; Waspam

Government
  - Type: Devolved government under presidential republic
  - Body: Regional Council
  - Regional Coordinator (Governor): TBDL leader (FSLN)

Population (2021 estimate)
  - Total: 541,189

GDP (Nominal, 2015 US dollar)
  - Total: $600 million (2023)
  - Per capita: $1,000 (2023)

GDP (PPP, 2015 int. dollar)
  - Total: $1.6 billion (2023)
  - Per capita: $2,700 (2023)
- ISO 3166 code: NI-AN
- Autonomy Statute: 30 October 1987
- Official languages: Spanish; Creole (Moskitian Creole and Rama Cay Creole); Miskito; Sumo (Mayangna and Ulwa); Rama; Garifuna
- Regional Council: 47 councilors
- National Assembly: 2 deputies (of 92)

The North Caribbean Coast Autonomous Region (Note: Spanish: Región Autónoma de la Costa Caribe Norte; abbr.: RACCN and formerly known as the North Atlantic Autonomous Region (Spanish: Región Autónoma del Atlántico Norte), RAAN) is one of two autonomous regions in Nicaragua. It was created along with the South Caribbean Coast Autonomous Region by the Autonomy Statute of 7 September 1986.

through a division of the former Zelaya Department. It covers an area of 33,106 km^{2} and has a population of 541,189 (2021 estimate). It is the largest autonomous region or department in Nicaragua. The capital is Puerto Cabezas. It contains part of the region known as the Mosquito Coast.

The North Autonomous Caribbean Coast has a Regional Council of representatives of different political parties, such as the Sandinistas (FSLN) and YATAMA (ethnic indigenous party), as well as all the municipalities. They hold sessions in an Assembly in Puerto Cabezas.

The North Autonomous Caribbean Coast, in addition to Mestizos, contains populations from different indigenous groups, including the Miskitos, Mayangnas, and others. The regional official languages are Creole (Moskitian Creole and Rama Cay Creole), Miskito, Sumo (Mayangna and Ulwa), Garifuna, and Rama, in addition to the national official language of Spanish, most males in Puerto Cabezas speak some English from when it was a US fruit plantation.

== Demographics ==
Ethnic group	Number (2005)	% (2005)
No declared ethnic group (Mainly mestizo or white)	134,754	42.9%
Miskito	102,806	32.7%
Mayangna	6,786	2.2%
Rama	208	0.1%
Garifuna	89	0.0%
Other Indigenous	419	0.1%
Caribbean Coast Mestizo	63,999	20.4%
Kriol	1,711	0.5%
Other ethnic group	539	0.2%
Unknown or unspecified ethnic group	2,819	0.9%
Total population	314,140	

== Municipalities ==
The RACCN contains eight municipalities:

1. Bonanza
2. Mulukukú
3. Prinzapolka
4. Puerto Cabezas
5. Rosita
6. Siuna
7. Waslala
8. Waspam

== Notable person ==
- Dorotea Wilson, politician and activist

== See also ==
- South Caribbean Coast Autonomous Region
