= Puerto Cabezas =

Municipality in Nicaragua

Puerto Cabezas Bilwi
- Municipality
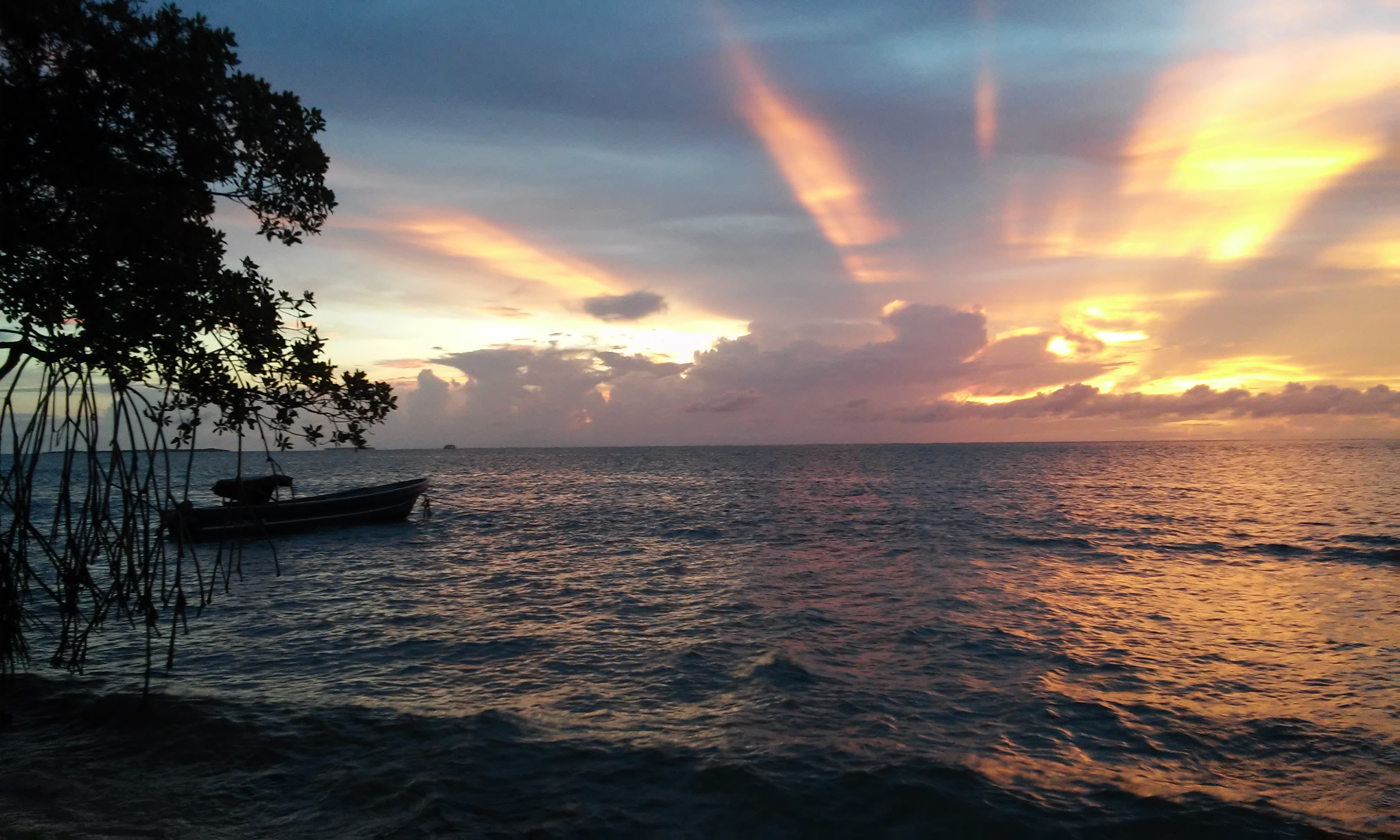
- Sunset in Puerto Cabezas

- Flag Seal

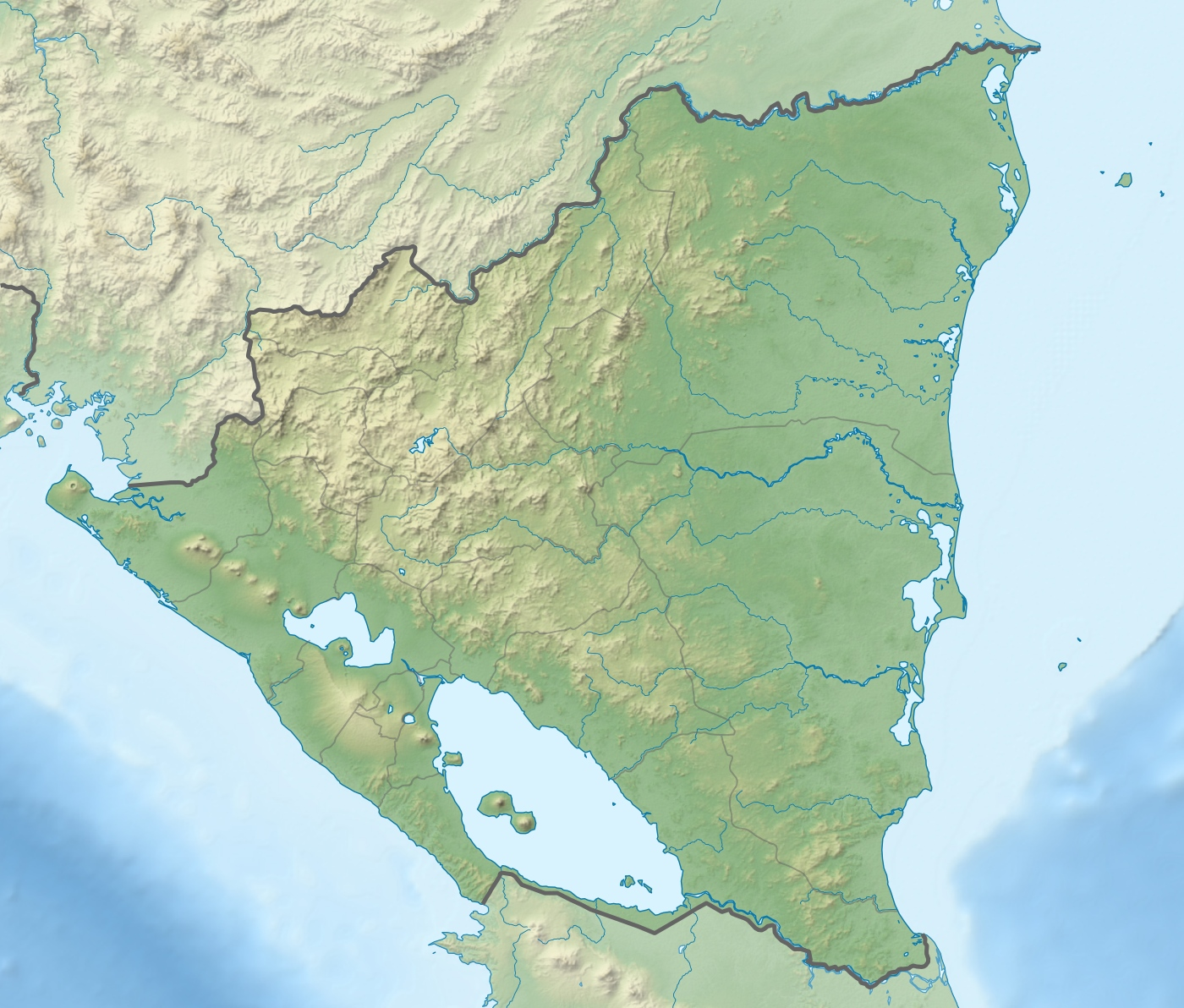
- Location in Nicaragua
- Coordinates: 14°01′41″N 83°22′51″W
- Country: Nicaragua
- Department: North Caribbean Coast Autonomous Region

Area
  - Municipality: 5,984.81 km^{2} (2,310.75 sq mi)
- Elevation: 7.9 m (26 ft)

Population (2023 estimate)
  - Municipality: 138,353
  - Density: 23.1174/km^{2} (59.8737/sq mi)
  - Urban: 86,279
- Time zone: UTC-06:00 (CST)
- Climate: Am

Puerto Cabezas (Spanish pronunciation: [ˈpweɾ.to ka.ˈβe.sas]; also known as Bragman's Bluff in English, or Bilwi in Miskito) is a municipality and city in Nicaragua. It is the capital of Miskito nation in the North Caribbean Coast Autonomous Region.

== Name ==
Puerto Cabezas is Bilwi in Miskito. The area was called Bragman's Bluff by English traders.

== History ==
The earliest known mention of Puerto Cabezas was by an English pirate in the 17th century. The village was one of eight English settlements in the region before being evacuated in 1787. In 1849, a British vice-consul and King George Augustus Frederic visited the area during their travels of the Mosquito Coast. Puerto Cabezas was a fishing village prior to the arrival of American companies.

Bragman’s Bluff Lumber Company established Puerto Cabezas as a company town. The company received a grant of 50,000 hectares of land, which were inhabited by Miskito people, from the Nicaraguan government on 28 January 1921. The United States maintained a consulate in Puerto Cabezas from 1931 to 1940.

The deep water port of Puerto Cabezas was a transportation hub in the area and superior to the shallow water port of Bluefields. The United States launched the Bay of Pigs Invasion from Puerto Cabezas.

Hurricane Felix hit Puerto Cabezas on September 4, 2007, killing about 100 people. Hurricane Eta hit the city on November 3, 2020, causing extensive damage.

The majority of the inhabitants speak the Miskito language.

== Climate ==
Puerto Cabezas has a tropical monsoon climate (Köppen climate classification Am) with significant rainfall year round, and a short dry season in March and April. Even so, these months see an average rainfall of 48 millimetres (1.9 in) and 54 millimetres (2.1 in). The average temperature ranges from 24.5 °C (76.1 °F) in February to 27.8 °C (82.0 °F) in May. The average annual rainfall is 2,799 millimetres (110 in), while 198 days receive measurable rain during an average year.

Climate data for Puerto Cabezas
| Month | Jan | Feb | Mar | Apr | May | Jun | Jul | Aug | Sep | Oct | Nov | Dec | Year |
|---|---|---|---|---|---|---|---|---|---|---|---|---|---|
| Mean daily maximum °C (°F) | 29.7 (85.5) | 29.7 (85.5) | 30.5 (86.9) | 31.3 (88.3) | 31.8 (89.2) | 31.4 (88.5) | 30.8 (87.4) | 31.2 (88.2) | 31.2 (88.2) | 31.6 (88.9) | 30.8 (87.4) | 29.7 (85.5) | 30.8 (87.5) |
| Daily mean °C (°F) | 25.0 (77.0) | 24.5 (76.1) | 26.5 (79.7) | 27.2 (81.0) | 27.8 (82.0) | 27.5 (81.5) | 27.1 (80.8) | 27.1 (80.8) | 27.0 (80.6) | 26.3 (79.3) | 25.8 (78.4) | 25.4 (77.7) | 26.4 (79.6) |
| Mean daily minimum °C (°F) | 18.8 (65.8) | 18.6 (65.5) | 19.8 (67.6) | 20.9 (69.6) | 21.8 (71.2) | 22.0 (71.6) | 21.9 (71.4) | 22.0 (71.6) | 22.2 (72.0) | 21.6 (70.9) | 20.8 (69.4) | 19.3 (66.7) | 20.8 (69.4) |
| Average rainfall mm (inches) | 148 (5.8) | 83 (3.3) | 48 (1.9) | 54 (2.1) | 183 (7.2) | 378 (14.9) | 414 (16.3) | 370 (14.6) | 303 (11.9) | 338 (13.3) | 278 (10.9) | 202 (8.0) | 2,799 (110.2) |
| Average rainy days (≥ 1.0 mm) | 16 | 11 | 7 | 8 | 12 | 20 | 23 | 22 | 20 | 20 | 19 | 20 | 198 |
Source: Hong Kong Observatory

== Twin towns – sister cities ==
Puerto Cabezas is a sister city to:

- Burlington, United States
- Luleå, Sweden
- Sant Pere de Ribes, Spain
- Vilafranca del Penedès, Spain

== Notable people ==
- Dorotea Wilson, politician and activist

== See also ==
- Awas Tingni
- Stennett H. Brooks

== Works cited ==
- Pineda, Baron (2006). Shipwrecked Identities: Navigating Race on Nicaragua's Mosquito Coast. Rutgers University Press. ISBN 9780813538136.
