= Bonanza, Nicaragua =

Bonanza
- Municipality
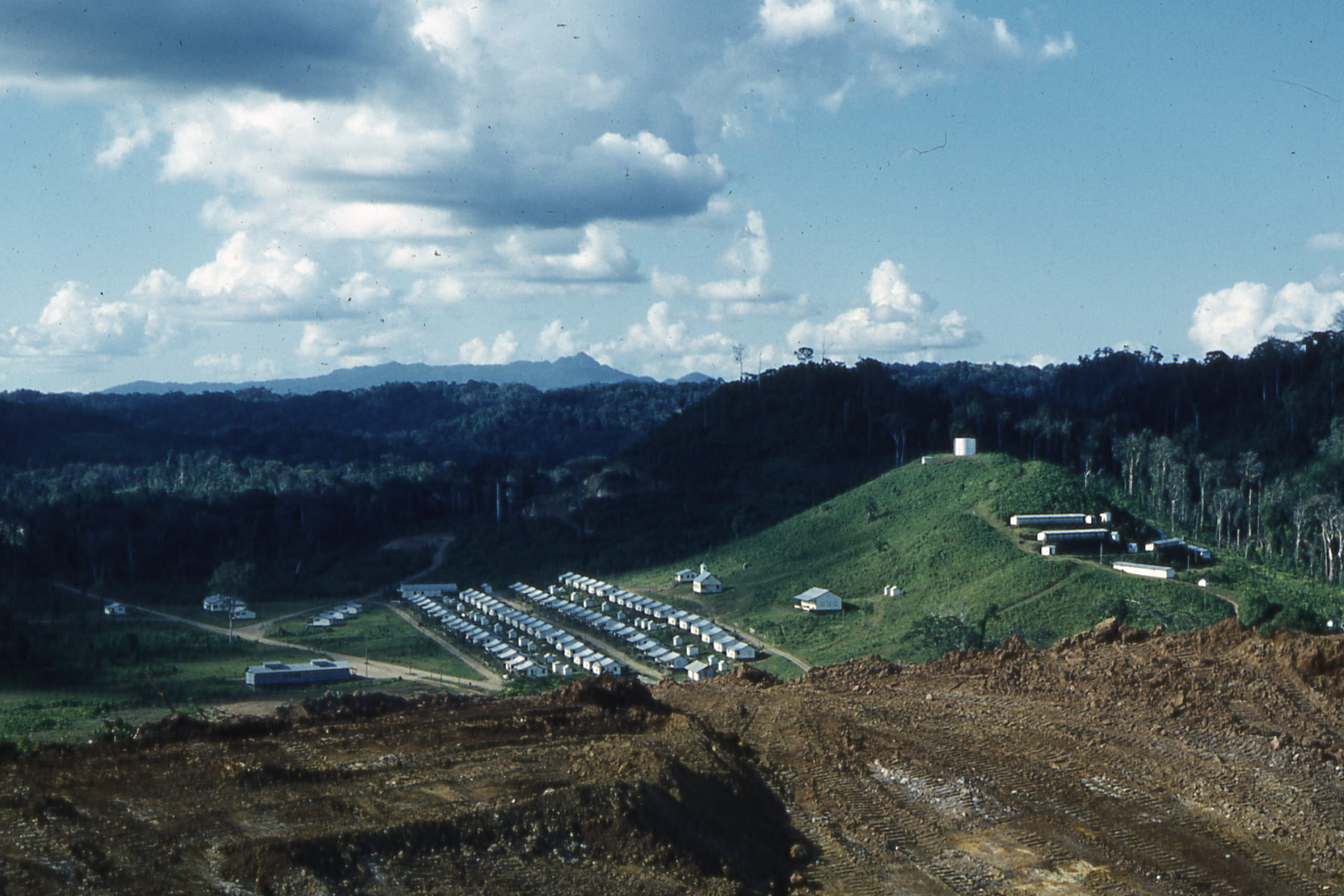
- Mining town of Bonanza in the late 1950s

- Location in Nicaragua
- Coordinates: 14°01′N 84°35′W
- Country: Nicaragua
- Department: North Caribbean Coast Autonomous Region

Area
  - Land: 732.80 sq mi (1,897.94 km^{2})

Population (2023 estimate)
  - Municipality: 31,975
  - Density: 43.634/sq mi (16.847/km^{2})
  - Urban: 15,138
- Time zone: UTC-6 (Central Time)
  - Summer (DST): UTC-6 (No DST)
- Climate: Am

Bonanza, Nicaragua (Spanish pronunciation: [boˈnansa]) is a town and a municipality in the North Caribbean Coast Autonomous Region of Nicaragua.

In 1996, the local authorities chose for the first time to vote.

Bonanza Municipality has a population of 31,249 (2022 estimate). The majority of the population are of mestiza origin and banana cultivation is important for the economy. The gold mining activity in Bonanza also attracted the population of many parts of the world in the search of the metal.

== Transportation ==
The town is served by San Pedro Airport.
