= Miskito language =

Misumalpan language in Central America

Miskito
- Miskitu
- Native to: Honduras, Nicaragua
- Region: North Caribbean Coast Autonomous Region, neighbouring areas
- Ethnicity: Miskito
- Native speakers: 150,000 (2015–2021)
- Language family: Misumalpan: Miskito

Language codes
- ISO 639-3: miq
- Glottolog: misk1235
- ELP: Mískito
- Linguasphere: 81-AAA-a
- Geographic distribution

Miskito (Miskitu in the Miskito language) is a Misumalpan language spoken by the Miskito people in northeastern Nicaragua, especially in the North Caribbean Coast Autonomous Region, and in eastern Honduras.

== Classification ==
With around 150,000 speakers, Miskito is the most widely spoken of a family of languages of Nicaragua and Honduras that has come to be known as Misumalpan. This name is formed from parts of the names of the family's subgroups: Miskito, Sumo, Matagalpan. The relationship of some aspects of the internal family tree to the family is uncertain. However, it is clear that: (1) Miskito is apart from Sumo and Matagalpan, which seem to share a common lower node, and (2) in the past Miskito was heavily influenced by other languages like English, German and Dutch. Sumo is thought to have been dominant in the area before the period of Miskito ascendancy. Today the relationship has been reversed: many former Sumo speakers have shifted to Miskito, which has in turn heavily influenced the Sumo dialects. Several of these (Panamahka and Tawahka) constitute the Mayangna sub-branch of Sumo, while the Ulwa language is in another sub-branch. The Matagalpan branch of Misumalpan contains two languages that are now extinct: Matagalpa and Cacaopera. The latter was formerly spoken in parts of eastern El Salvador.

== History ==
=== Language contact ===
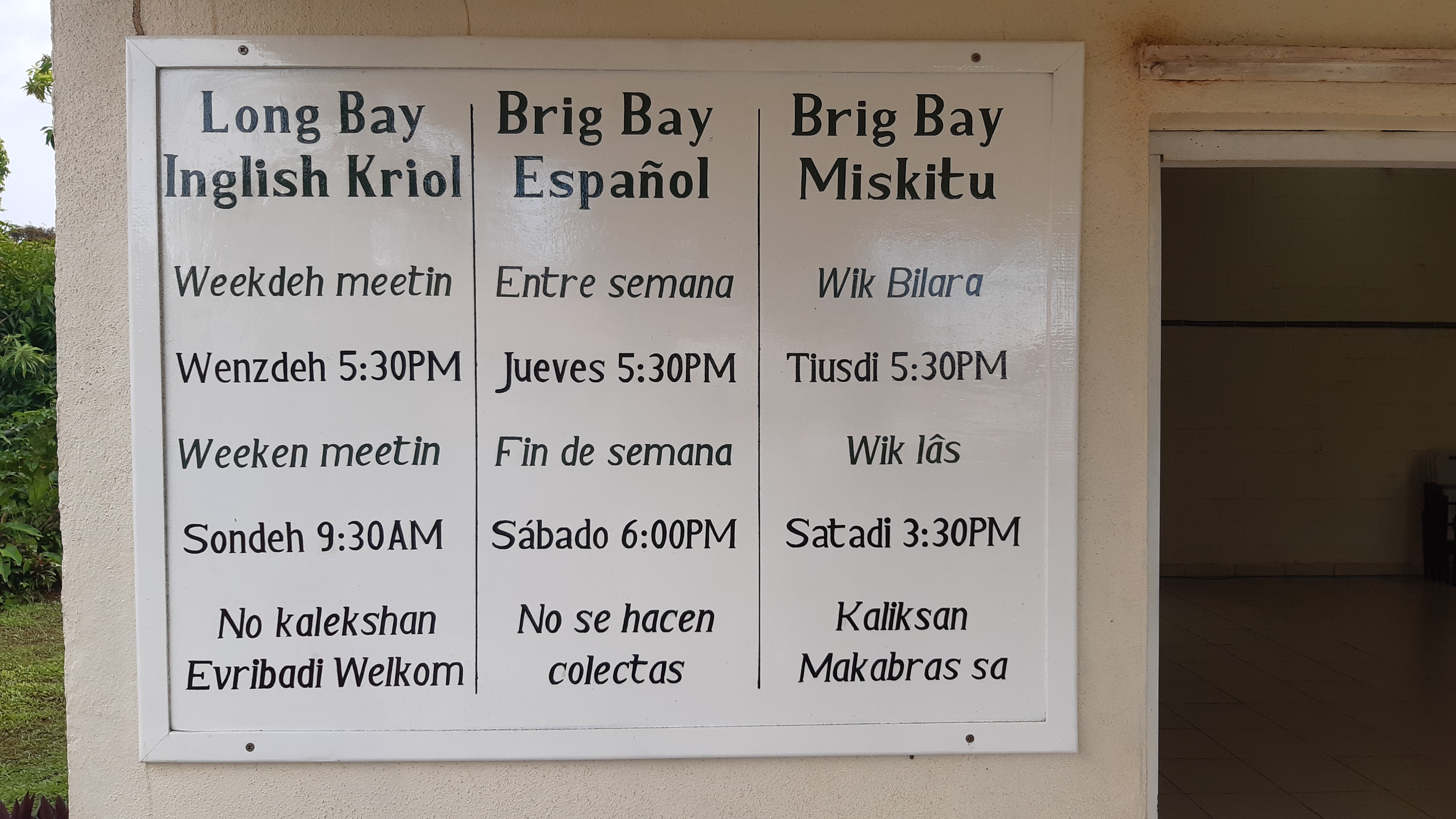
A timetable for a branch of the Jehovah's Witnesses on Big Corn Island in Inglish Kriol, Spanish and Miskitu

In addition to many elements borrowed from other Misumalpan languages, Miskito has many loanwords from Germanic languages like English, German and Dutch. Even though Spanish is the official language of Nicaragua and Honduras, its influence on Miskito is much more recent and hence more superficial. Many other languages appear to have had influence on Miskito vocabulary and grammar, including various Sumi dialects, Arawak, Rama, Carib, and certain Western African languages.

Many of the Miskitos are native American and also mixed with British, Chinese, Dutch, German and African. The Miskito people had a strong relationship with the British and they signed the Treaty of Friendship and Alliance. Eventually, the British began to lose interest in the region, and Britain allowed Nicaragua to have uncontested claim over the Mosquito Coast. A treaty was signed in which a Miskito reserve, a self-governing entity that enjoyed semi-sovereign rights, was given to the Miskito people, but Honduras eventually took over the area.

In the 20th century the Miskito language started to dwindle. Honduras, being a former Spanish colony, officially used the Spanish language, and this stifled the proliferation of the Miskito language in the 20th century. In schools, children were forbidden from speaking Miskito for most of the 20th century and could only speak Spanish; young generations had less of an opportunity to practice the language.

In the 1990s, many groups lobbied against the rule and promoted bilingual schools to preserve the Miskito language. Twenty such bilingual schools exist.

== Phonology ==
=== Phonemes ===
Vowels
	Short		Long	
	Front	Back	Front	Back
High	i	u	iː ⟨î⟩	uː ⟨û⟩
Low	a		aː ⟨â⟩	

- The exact status of vowel length is not clear; long vowels are not consistently indicated in Miskito writing.

Consonants
		Bilabial	Alveolar	Palatal	Velar	Glottal
Nasals	voiced	m	n		ŋ ⟨ng⟩	
Nasals	voiceless	m̥ ⟨mh⟩	n̥ ⟨nh⟩		ŋ̊ ⟨ngh⟩	
Plosives	voiceless	p	t		k	
Plosives	voiced	b	d			
Fricatives			s			h
Liquids	voiced		l, r			
Liquids	voiceless		l̥ ⟨lh⟩, r̥ ⟨rh⟩			
Semivowels				j ⟨y⟩	w	

=== Suprasegmentals ===
Word stress is generally on the first syllable of each word.

H has been included on the above consonant chart out of deference to the orthography and previous descriptions, but may in fact represent a suprasegmental feature rather than a consonantal phoneme (except in loanwords such as heven 'heaven'). Occurrence of h is restricted to the stressed syllable in a word, and its realization consists of the devoicing of adjacent vowel and consonant phonemes within that syllable. In spelling it is customary to place the letter h at the end of the syllable so affected.
- lih 'turtle'
- naha 'this'
- pihni 'white'
- banhta 'roof'
- walhwal 'four'
- banghkaia 'to fill'

=== Phonotactics ===
Syllables may have up to two consonants preceding the vowel nucleus, and two following it. This may be represented by the formula (C)(C)V(C)(C). Examples of monosyllabic words:

- ba 'definite article'
- ya? 'who?'
- an? 'how many?'
- wal 'two'
- plun 'food'
- puls! 'play!'
- praks! 'close it!'

Within words of more than one syllable interior clusters may therefore contain more than two consonants (rarely more than three), but in such cases there is generally a morpheme boundary involved:

- wamtla 'your house'
- alkbia 'he will take it'

Simplification of underlying consonant clusters in verb forms takes place, with stem consonants disappearing when certain suffixes are added to verb stems of certain phonological shapes:

- sab-aia 'perforate' → Imperative sa-s, Negative imperative sa-para, Future II 2 sa-ma, 3 sa-bia, Different-subject participle 3 sa-ka
- atk-aia 'buy' → Imperative at-s, Negative imperative at-para, Future II 2 at-ma, 3 at-bia, Different-subject participle 3 at-ka

== Orthography ==
G. R. Heath wrote on Miskito grammar in American Anthropologist in 1913 and describes its orthography and phonology as follows:

The vowels a, e, i, o, u correspond almost exactly to the same sound of those letters in German.

The consonants g, j, s, w, y represent the sounds heard in the English words get, jet, set, wet, and yet; and the combination ch stands for the sound heard in the word chest. C by itself will not be used. The other letters have the same power as in English, except that the aspirate h is always to be pronounced, even at the end of a syllable.

The stress accent in Miskito is almost invariably on the first syllable.

When the grave and acute accents occur on the same vowel, will be imaginary accentuated just like English.

Nasalized vowels are sometimes met with: they resemble the ordinary vowels followed by a sound corresponding to the French n in mon. But as this nasal sound seems to be pronounced not after, but simultaneously with, the vowels, it seems better to mark the vowels with the tilde (˜), to indicate that the vowels themselves are nasalized. Such nasalized vowels are always long, thus: ã, ẽ, ĩ, õ, ũ.

The combination ng is a single sound: the double sound in the English word "longer" will be represented by ngg.

There is still much controversy about Miskito orthography and it cannot be considered settled, even with printed Miskito grammars, Bible translations, and other texts.

=== Miskito alphabet ===
The alphabet for Miskito consists of 19 letters, and includes vowels and consonants.

A (a), B (be), D (de), G (ge), H (ha), I (i), J (je), K (ka), L (el), M (em), N (en), P (pe), Q (ku), R (ar), S (es), T (te), U (u), W (dubilu), Y (yei).

== Vocabulary ==
Miskito	English
yul	dog
matis	rat
pus	cat
dildil	butterfly
tairi	mosquito
tuisa	tongue
maya waitna	husband
maya mairin	wife

== See also ==
- Miskito grammar
- Miskito Coast Creole
