= Sumo languages =

Misumalpan languages of Nicaragua and Honduras

Sumo
- Sumu
- Native to: Nicaragua, Honduras
- Region: Huaspuc River and its tributaries
- Ethnicity: Sumo people
- Native speakers: (9,000 cited 1997–2009)
- Language family: Misumalpan: Sumalpan; Sumo

Language codes
- ISO 639-3: Either: yan – Mayangna ulw – Ulwa
- Glottolog: sumu1234
- ELP: Sumo
- Linguasphere: 81-AAB-a

Sumo (also known as Sumu) is the collective name for a group of Misumalpan languages spoken in Nicaragua and Honduras. Hale & Salamanca (2001) classify the Sumu languages into a northern Mayangna, composed of the Tawahka and Panamahka dialects, and southern Ulwa. Sumu specialist Ken Hale considered the differences between Ulwa and Mayangna in both vocabulary and morphology to be so considerable that he prefers to speak of Ulwa as a language distinct from the northern Sumu varieties.

== Phonology ==
=== Consonants ===
		Labial	Alveolar		Palatal	Velar	Glottal
		Labial	plain	lateral	Palatal	Velar	Glottal
Nasal	voiceless	m̥	n̥			ŋ̊	
Nasal	voiced	m	n			ŋ	
Plosive	voiceless	p	t			k	
Plosive	voiced	b	d				
Fricative			s				h
Liquid	voiceless		r̥	l̥			
Liquid	voiced		r	l			
Semivowel		w			j		

=== Vowels ===
	Front		Back	
	short	long	short	long
Close	i	iː	u	uː
Open	a	aː		

== Sources ==
- Hale, Ken, and Danilo Salamanca (2001) "Theoretical and Universal Implications of Certain Verbal Entries in Dictionaries of the Misumalpan Languages", in Frawley, Hill & Munro eds. Making Dictionaries: Preserving indigenous Languages of the Americas. University of California Press.
- Norwood, Susan (1997). Gramática de la lengua sumu. Managua: CIDCA.
