= Afro-Nicaraguans =

Nicaraguans of African descent

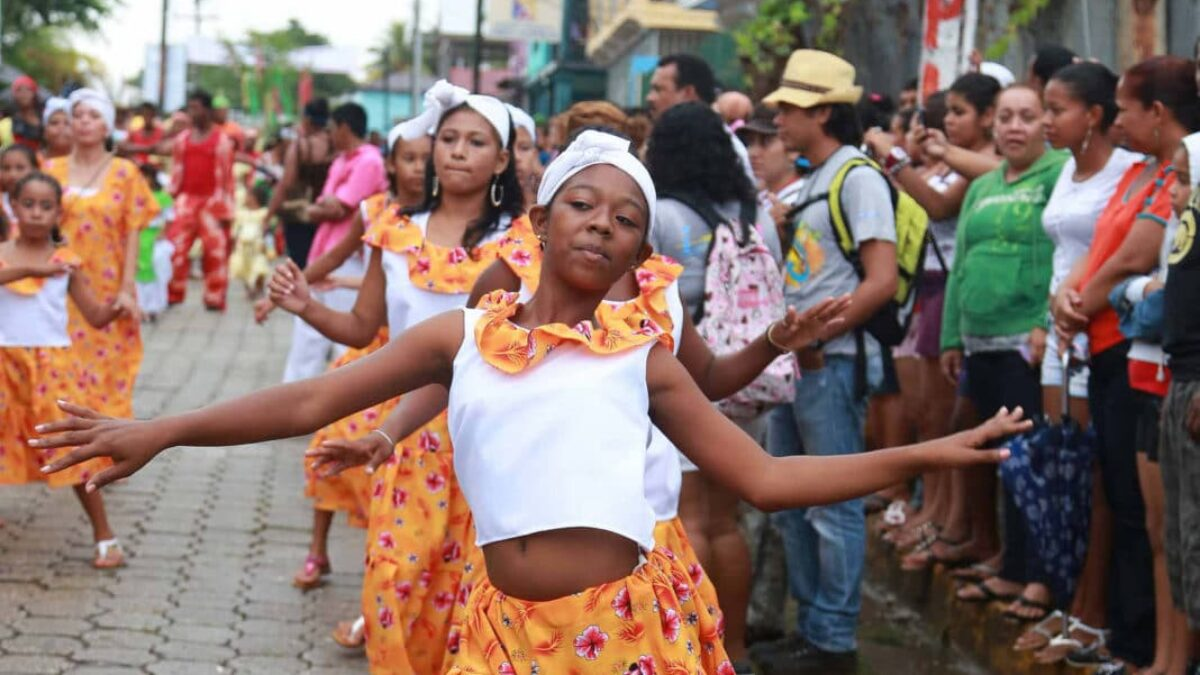
- Afro-Nicaraguans performing Palo de Mayo in Bluefields, Nicaragua.

Total population
- 500,000

Regions with significant populations
- Predominantly on the Moskitian Shore; Bluefields, and in large cities like Managua. A small minority live abroad in the United States, Panama, Costa Rica, and Spain.

Languages
- Spanish; English; Indigenous languages; Moskitian Creole; Rama Cay Creole; African languages

Religion
- Roman Catholicism and Protestantism, Garifuna, Sumo, Rama and Miskitos cultures.

Related ethnic groups
- Sub-saharan Africans, Afro-Caribbean, Belizeans, Jamaicans, African Americans.

Afro-Nicaraguans are Nicaraguans of African descent. There are four distinct Afro-Nicaraguan ethnic groups, including Creoles, who speak Moskitian Creole and trace their origin from the Anglo-Caribbean countries; Miskito Sambus, who speak Miskito and/or Moskitian Creole and are descendants of Spanish slaves and indigenous Central Americans; Garifunas, who speak Garifuna and are descendants of Zambos (Kalinago, Arawakan-speaking people, and shipwrecked maroons) who were expelled from St. Vincent; and lastly, Rama Cay Zambos, who speak Rama Cay Creole and are a subset of the Miskito. At 9% of the population, Afro-Nicaraguans are the country's third largest ethnic group, behind whites and Mestizos (mixed-race indigenous and white).

== History ==
The first eleven Africans enslaved in Nicaragua were transported from Panama by Francisco Hernández de Córdoba, who is known as the founder of Nicaragua. These eleven individuals were enslaved by conquistadors and various civil and religious officials. One of these Africans was a boy who Gil González Dávila had purchased for 300 pesos from Pedro Arias Dávila, the colonial administrator. They were baptized before being taken to the newly founded Nicaragua. In 1531, the Town Council of León asked the King of Spain for authorization to bring a thousand slaves, tax-free, to Nicaragua. On November 24, 1544, the Town Council of Granada, also asked for authorization to import 50 people to enslave them at the opening of the San Juan River. After passage of the New Laws of 1542, it was no longer legal for Spanish colonists to enslave the Native Americans; however, they required laborers in their newly formed haciendas. So, in 1558, Bishop Lazaro Carrasco asked for the King's license to import and enslave 600 people of African descent, as they would remedy the situation by working the land.

The number of African people brought to Nicaragua to be enslaved is estimated in the thousands. Because most Spanish who emigrated to America were men, soldiers and colonists took indigenous and African women as partners and concubines. As early as the 18th century, the majority of enslaved people who were born in the territory were mulattoes. According to colonial documents, enslaved people came from such ethnic groups as the Arará; others were characterized as being of the "Angola caste" (which may correspond to West Central Africa); "the Congo caste"; "the Mina caste" (possibly from the Gold Coast or present day Ghana); and Mandinka; the Ewe and Fon (present-day Ghana, Togo and Benin); the Yoruba people from Yorubaland, (present-day Nigeria, Togo and Benin); and the Ashanti (present-day Ghana). The proportion of enslaved men and women was roughly equal.

By 1820, the number of mixed-race people—including zambos (mixed African and native people), mulattoes, quadroons (those with a quarter African blood), and other mixtures—had increased significantly, such that persons of at least some African descent made up 84 percent of the population, according to the mayor of León. Some of these mixed-race individuals swelled the ranks of the middle class, while an unknown quantity of others, likely numbering in the hundreds, were kept as slaves. During the first half of the 17th century, there are records of slaves laboring in the indigo mills and in the private homes of Spaniards and Criollos (people of Spanish descent born in the New World).

Since the 17th century, several groups of slaves rebelled against their owners and migrated to other places and settled in small clandestine colonies, free from Spanish rule. Therefore, these slaves the "Cimarrons" (cimarrones) were affected by several royal orders issued against them. One of them agreed to raise an army against those colonies and return enslaved people to their owners. This law was fulfilled in Nicaragua.

However, the Spanish were not the only people to import people to make them slaves to Nicaragua. The English, who were colonists on the coast of Nicaragua since 1633, also imported groups of people to enslave since the late 17th century. The English began cultivating sugar cane and indigo around Bluefields and on the banks of the Rio Coco, which were labor-intensive crops. The slaves were also used for cotton plantations and especially for cutting mahogany. As in the case of slaves imported by the Spanish, the African slaves of the English mixed with the Miskito, Sumu, and Rama indigenous peoples of the area.

Most "caseros" (derived from Spanish "Casa" -house- i.e., men assigned to domestic service in the homes of Creoles and Spaniards) enslaved African and mulatto people who also performed agricultural and cattle, but were not the main operating system. Finally, following independence, slavery was abolished by the decree of the Constituent Assembly of April 17, 1824.

However, in the early 19th century arrived slaves from Jamaica to the Nicaraguan Caribbean coasts, when the region was a British protectorate. They became "creoles". Later, in 1832, some groups of Garifuna people came to the Caribbean Coast of Nicaragua from Honduras for fighting for their land, to be recognized as ethnic, and to preserve their cultural identity. However, the Garifuna were met with fierce opposition from the Miskito people, as indigenous of these territories, and of the Creole, who forced them to accept English as the language for business transactions and a half for insertion and recognition in society.

== Communities ==
Most enslaved people imported by the Spanish to Nicaragua were mixed during the colonial era and their mulatto and Quadroon descendants also re-mixed with the majority indigenous, mestizo and white. For this reason, today, the descendants of black enslaved people who were imported by the Spanish in Nicaragua are mostly white people or Amerindians with some black ancestors. Black Nicaraguans are descended from the enslaved people who were imported by the British and the West Indian immigrants who arrived on the shores of the country in the 17th century. Most Afro-Nicaraguans reside on the Caribbean coast of Nicaragua, which is also the vast and sparsely populated region, that had British occupation from 1635 to 1860. The Afro-Nicaraguans are fundamentally divided into three groups, also present in Honduras: Creoles (majority group), Garifuna, and Indigenous zambos. The Afro-Nicaraguan population is descended from enslaved people who were exported from places such as Panama, Nigeria, Saint Vincent and the Grenadines, and Jamaica.

=== Indigenous Zambos ===
These are indigenous groups formed by the mixture of African descent and the Mayangna, Rama, and Miskitos indigenous ethnic groups. Their African ancestors were enslaved Africans kidnapped and brought in bondage to Nicaragua by English settler colonizers on the coast of Nicaragua, in 1633. Since the late 17th century, when the British forced enslaved Africans to cultivate sugar cane and indigo around Bluefields and on the banks of the Rio Coco, there were imported the first enslaved Africans to do the arduous and dangerous work of the canefields. The slaves were also forced to labor in cotton plantations and especially in lumber extraction mahogany. The arrival of African slaves to the area facilitated the race mixtures between this group and the natives of the place, the aforementioned Miskito, Sumu and Rama. Thus, Sumo and Rama are zambos. While the Miskito are a mixture of Bawinka Amerindians, Africans, zambos (sumos "tawahkas"), and European.

=== Creoles ===
They are mostly descendants of former slaves from Jamaica, who arrived in the region in the early 19th century when the region was a British protectorate and retained a rich indigenous culture. That is, are Creoles. The Nicaraguan Creole received from the English, their language, their religion, and customs. Of old, the coastal rebutted the inability of the rest of Nicaraguans (Pacific) to understand their cultural identity, and although desde 1987 the Caribbean has a different territorial system (RAAN and RAAS), many sectors still consider themselves neglected by the central state and not yet given a move back legal, political, economic, religious and cultural life of the Caribbean Coast to the rest of Nicaragua.

=== Garifuna ===
They live on the country's coasts. They are a mixture of Carib Amerindians and Afro-Caribbeans of the Saint Vicente island (unlike the Creoles), from where they were exported to the island of Roatan, Honduras because rebelled them against the English domain of the island. From there, they migrated to the Honduran coast, from where they spread to the rest of the Central American coast to Costa Rica.

The Garifuna came to the Caribbean Coast of Nicaragua in 1832 with the same objectives that motivated since its installation in continental America (after the wreck of the slave ship in 1636 near the island of St. Vincent in the Lesser Antilles): fighting for his land, be recognized as ethnic and preserve their cultural identity. However, the Garifuna were met with fierce opposition from the Miskito, as indigenous of this territory, and of Black Creole, who forced them to accept English as the language for business transactions and a half for insertion and recognition in society, according to research on ethnicity in the Caribbean Nicaraguan, of Silvio Araica Aguilar and Cleopatra Morales (May 2000). The authors report that "the major contradictions between Creole and Garifuna, despite having the same ancestors of African origin lies in the genealogy of its ethnic composition and thus the result of cultural syncretism" (May, 2000). According to the Human Development Report of the United Nations to Central America in 2003, in Nicaragua would 2000 garífunas.

== Nicaraguan coasts: a distinct region ==
The African slaves arrives on Nicaraguan Coast during the British commercial and political domain of the Nicaraguan coast (1524–1821), many of which were exported by the British themselves (except the Creoles). In 1860 Great Britain and the United States sign a treaty, because international negotiations between the two countries developed. So, from 1894, England, abandons gradually the Caribbean coast, delivering in 1905, the territory to American companies, occupying the latter will last until 1930. After British withdrawal, on the Caribbean coast, it remains for 44 years as an autonomous region of Nicaragua, having its own laws and regulations until 1894, when President José Santos Zelaya said the reintegration of Moskitia to Nicaragua, developing monopolies for mestizos in the area and to U.S. interests, as well as replacing the name of the Mosquito Coast by the Department of Zelaya. Beyond this, the government encouraged massive immigration of Nicaraguan mestizos, especially those engaged in military affairs, commercial, speculative, and entrepreneurs. Immigrants and Nicaraguan government officials were evicted from their lands by the indigenous Amerindians and Afro-descendants living in them and imposed heavy fines on the natives of the coast. In addition, the government abolished the laws of the region and built the Nicaraguan government institutions and structures, forming schools, police, government, etc. This imposition of that such institutions were built, was made through the use of force. The most important result was the prohibition of education in English and their own languages, only languages spoken by the population – indigenous population, Garifuna and Afro-descendants- of this Nicaraguan area. It caused an abandonment of schools and colleges on the coast for generations. The Nicaraguan coast always remained economically dominated by American companies until the 1930s when U.S. companies were gradually replaced by the capital of the Somoza family and its allies until 1979 with the triumph of the Sandinista Revolution. In 1987, the Caribbean coast achieved autonomy from Nicaragua. The government, fearing the loss of the territory, divided it into two autonomous regions now known as the South Caribbean Coast Autonomous Region and North Caribbean Coast Autonomous Region, but internal conflicts remain.

== Notable Afro-Nicaraguans ==
- Ariagner Smith
- Scharllette Allen, first Afro-Nicaraguan to be crowned Miss Nicaragua
- June Beer, artist and poet
- Rudel Calero, footballer
- David Green, MLB baseball player
- Devern Hansack, MLB baseball player
- Wilton López, MLB baseball player
- Ricardo Mayorga, professional boxer
- Hamilton West
- Dorotea Wilson, politician and women's rights activist

== See also ==
- English settlement in Nicaragua
