= Languages of Nicaragua =

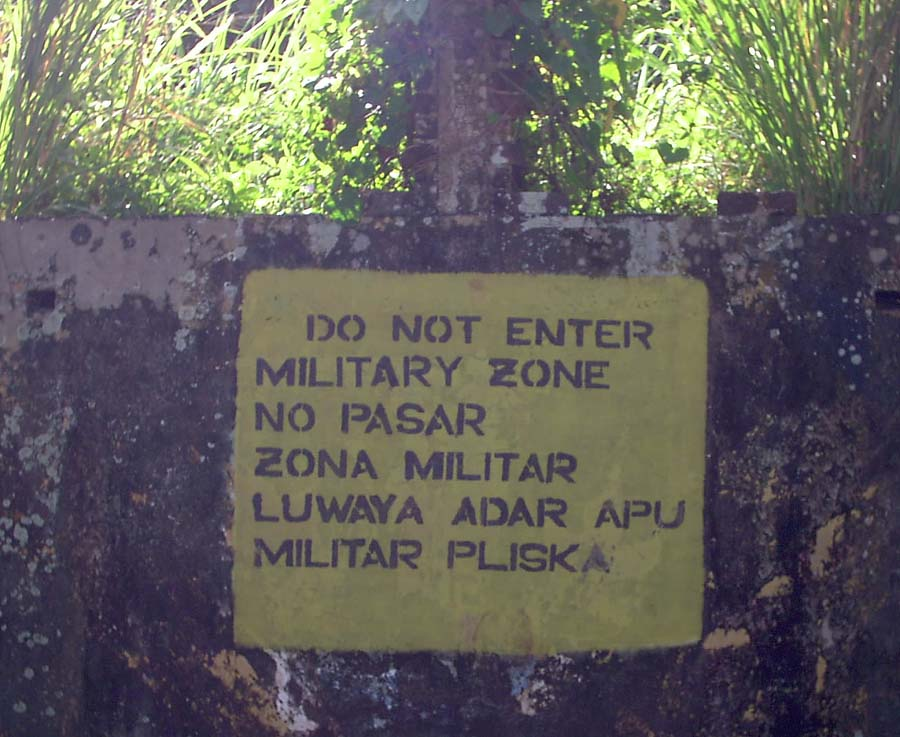
- Sign in Bluefields in English, Spanish and Miskito
- Official: Spanish
- Indigenous: Garifuna, Miskito, Rama, Sumo languages
- Vernacular: Nicaraguan Spanish, Moskitian Creole, Rama Cay Creole
- Foreign: English
- Signed: Nicaraguan Sign Language
- Keyboard layout: QWERTY

The official language of Nicaragua is Spanish; however, Nicaraguans on the Caribbean coast speak indigenous languages and also English. The communities located on the Caribbean coast also have access to education in their native languages. Additionally, Nicaragua has four extinct indigenous languages.

== Languages ==
Languages of Nicaragua

Language	Speakers
Arabic	400
Chinese	7,000
English	20,334
Garífuna	1,500
Miskito	154,400
Sign language	3,000
Spanish	4,347,000
Sumo	6,700
Rama	24
Creole English	30,000

Source: Ethnologue

=== Spanish ===
Spanish is spoken by 90% of the country's population. In Nicaragua the voseo form is common, just as in other countries in Central and South America such as Argentina, Bolivia, Costa Rica, coastal parts of Colombia, Honduras or Paraguay. Spanish has many different dialects spoken throughout Latin America, Central American Spanish is the dialect spoken in Nicaragua.

Phonetics and phonology

Some characteristics of Nicaraguan phonology include:

- /s/ at the end of a syllable or before a consonant is pronounced [h].
- j (/x/) is a [h].
- There is a clear distinction between /l/ and /r/, compared to Caribbean dialects.
- /s/, /z/ and in some cases /c/ (as in cerrar) are pronounced as [s].

=== English ===
English is spoken among immigrants from the United States and Canada, and widely used by the tourism sector. On the Caribbean coast, due to the African and English heritage of residents of places like Bluefields, Pearl Lagoon and the Corn Islands, an English creole is spoken by the majority of the population, coexisting with indigenous languages.

== Minority languages ==
Nicaragua has many minority groups. Many ethnic groups in Nicaragua, such as the Chinese Nicaraguans and Palestinian Nicaraguans, have maintained their ancestral languages while also speaking Spanish and/or English. Minority languages include Chinese, Arabic, German, Italian among others.

== Indigenous languages ==
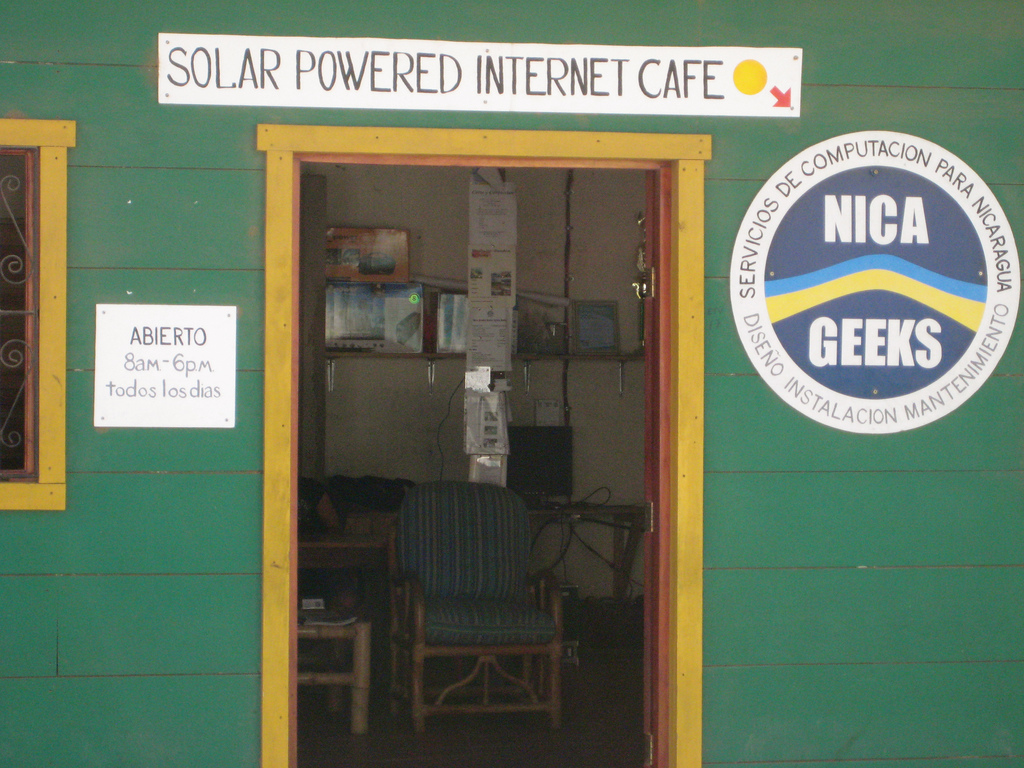
Signage in English and Spanish at an Internet café.

Several indigenous peoples on the Caribbean coast still use their native language, the main languages being Miskito language, Sumo language, and Rama language. Other Indigenous languages spoken include Garifuna.

Miskito

Miskito is a Misumalpan language spoken by the Miskito people in northeastern Nicaragua along the Caribbean coast, especially in the North Caribbean Coast Autonomous Region. The Miskito language is the most widely spoken indigenous language in Nicaragua, this is because the Miskito people also hold the highest population of Indigenous people in the country.

Mayangna

Mayangna (also known as Sumo or Sumu) is a Misumalpan language spoken in Nicaragua by the Mayangna people. There is wide dialectal variation, and sometimes the major dialects may be listed as separate languages.

Rama

Rama is one of the indigenous languages of the Chibchan family spoken by the Rama people on the island of Rama Cay and south of lake Bluefields on the Caribbean Coast of Nicaragua. The Rama language is severely endangered. Their language was described as "dying quickly for lack of use" as early as the 1860s. By 1980, the Rama were noted as having "all but lost their original ethnic language", and had become speakers of a form of English creole instead, Rama Cay Creole which is spoken by 8,000–9,000 people.

Language revival efforts began in 1980–1981 under the Sandinistas however, they were not successful. The fieldwork for the first dictionary of Rama was done during this time by Robin Schneider, a graduate student from the University of Berlin. In 1992, only approximately 36 fluent speakers could be found among an ethnic population of 649 individuals in 1992, of whom only a few scattered individuals live outside Nicaragua. The number of speakers on Rama Cay island was only 4 in 1992, due to language shift to English that engendered Rama Cay Creole.

Nicaraguan Sign Language

Nicaraguan Sign Language has been of particular interest to linguists as one of the few languages whose birth was recorded.

=== Extinct languages ===
Nicaragua has a total of 4 extinct languages:

Nahuat

The Nahuat language was spoken on the Pacific coast, mainly in Rivas Department, by the Nicarao people. It is a Nahuan language, closely related to Nahuatl, and is spoken to this day in El Salvador, as well as formerly being spoken elsewhere in Central America. Nahuat became the lingua franca in Nicaragua during the 16th century. A hybrid form of Nahuat-Spanish was spoken by many Nicaraguans up until the 19th century.

Mangue

The Mangue language, also known as Chorotega, consisted of several dialects spoken in western Nicaragua by Chorotega natives. Mangue is closely related to the Chiapanec language spoken in Mexico, and is classified as belonging to the Oto-Manguean language family. In the Monimbo neighborhood of the city of Masaya, there are many Chorotega natives but the language that they speak is Spanish.

Subtiaba

The Subtiaba language was an Oto-Manguean language which was spoken on the Pacific slope of Nicaragua by the indigenous Subtiaba people (also sometimes referred to as Maribios, Hokan Xiu, or Xiu-Subtiabas). In 1925, Edward Sapir wrote an article based on scant evidence arguing for the inclusion of Subtiaba in his hypothesized Hokan languages group. Others have linked Subtiaba to the Jicaque and Tol languages of Honduras, but it is generally accepted that Subtiaba is an Oto-Manguean language that shares a close affinity with the Tlapanec language of Mexico. When Sapir wrote about Subtiaba in 1925, it was already very endangered or moribund.

Matagalpa

The Matagalpa language was a Misumalpan language spoken by the indigenous Matagalpa people. In 1981, the population of the Matagalpa people was estimated at 18,000–20,000. The Matagalpa people live in the Central highlands of Nicaragua in the departments of Matagalpa and Jinotega. Matagalpa became extinct in the 19th century; the eponymous people now speak Spanish. Only a few short word lists remain. It was closely related to the Cacaopera language.

== Gallery ==
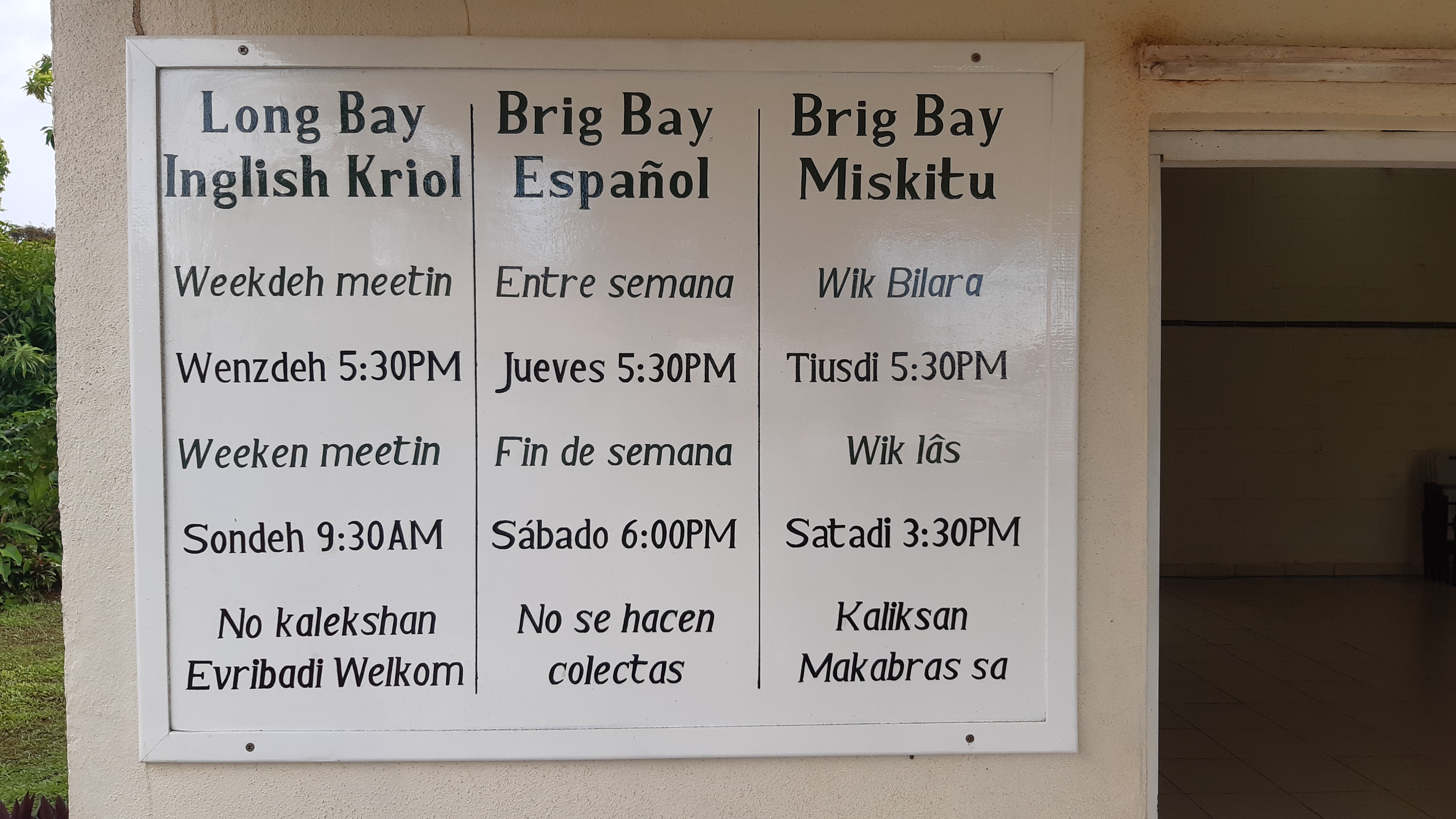
A timetable for a branch of the Jehovah's Witnesses on Big Corn Island in Inglish Kriol, Spanish and Miskitu

== See also ==
- Deafness in Nicaragua
- Demographics of Nicaragua
