= Miskito Coast Creole =

English-based creole of Honduras and Nicaragua

- Native to: Honduras, Nicaragua
- Native speakers: ~100,000
- Language family: English-African Creole: Guinea Coast Creole English; Caribbean English Creole; Western Caribbean; Miskitoic Creole English; Belize-Miskito Creole English; Miskito Coast Creole

Language codes
- ISO 639-3: bzk
- Glottolog: nica1252
- ELP: Nicaragua Creole English
- Linguasphere: 52-ABB-af

Miskito Coast Creole, or Nicaragua Creole English, is an English-based creole language spoken in coastal Honduran and Nicaraguan regions of Mosquito Coast on the Caribbean Sea; its approximately 100,000 speakers are spread over the Gracias a Dios Department of Honduras and RACCN and RACCS regions of Nicaragua. Mosquito is the nickname that is given to the region and earlier residents by early Europeans who visited and settled in the area. The term "Miskito" is now more commonly used to refer to both the people and the language.

Miskito creole is nearly identical to, and hence mutually intelligible with, Belizean Creole, and retains a high degree of intelligibility with all other Central American English creoles. It is also sometimes classified as a dialect of Jamaican Patois creole but this classification has been disputed. It also includes influences from the Miskito language and West/Central Africa.

== Geographic distribution ==
Speakers of Miskito Coast Creole are primarily persons of African, Amerindian, and European descent in the towns and on the offshore islands of the Miskito Coast. The main concentration of speakers is around Bluefields, and a smaller portion in Puerto Cabezas, Prinzapolka, Bilwi, Pearl Lagoon, the offshore Corn Islands, as well as other smaller communities in both regions. Bluefields is the capital of the South Caribbean Coast Autonomous Region, where a large amount of inhabitants of the city are Spanish-speaking Nicaraguans from the Pacific Coast.

Most of the creole speakers are located along the banks of the large rivers and lagoons that surround the area. Inland, the language is spoken in the "mining triangle" which compromises Siuna, Bonanza and Rosita on the Prinzapolka River. On the Pacific coast, there are small numbers of speakers in Corinto, Puerto Sandino, and the Nicaraguan capital of Managua. A smaller portion of the population stays in large towns along the northern Caribbean coast of Nicaragua, as well as other neighboring Central American countries.

Rama Cay Creole is a variety of the language spoken by the Rama people on Rama Cay, an island in the Bluefields Lagoon.

The environment is that of a tropical rainforest with an average rainfall of 448 centimeters and temperatures that range 26.4 °C (79 °F) and up.

Geographic distribution of Miskito Coast Creole in 1987
Location	Number of speakers
Bluefields	11,258
Corn Islands	3,030
Pearl Lagoon	1,285
Bilwi	1,733
Other locations	8,417
Total	25,723

== History ==
African slaves were shipwrecked on the Mosquito Coast as early as 1640, which started the interaction between them and the local Miskito population.

=== 17th to 19th centuries ===
The modern-day Creoles' ancestors came as escapees from shipwrecked slave ships to the Nicaraguan Caribbean coast from Africa between the 17th and the late 18th centuries. The escapees went to the jungles and soon formed relations with the local Indigenous tribes and intermarried. The Coast was officially under British protection from 1740 to 1787 according to the Treaty of Friendship and Alliance with the Miskito Kingdom and remained under British influence until the late 19th century.

While they were here, the African population renewed and transformed its culture and traits by taking elements of its African culture and mixing it with European culture along with the local Indian tribes which created a new culture. In 1787, the British abandoned their claims on the Mosquito coast in a treaty that was put forth. Slaves who ran away or who were abandoned had made their own African communities at Bluefields. Many escaped slaves from other islands had also come over to the area to settle down. Great Britain signed the Treaty of Managua which gave a portion of an area to the natives there and allowed it to be self-governed. That allowed for the African communities to grow and flourish. Their culture became solid after it had gained economic, political and social control over the Mosquito Coast. The people in the communities then began to start calling themselves Creoles.

In the mid-19th century, more English- or Creole-speaking laborers, primarily from Jamaica, were brought to the Coast as laborers. However, following the 1894 formal annexation of the Miskito Kingdom by Nicaragua, an increasing number of Spanish-speakers migrated to the area.

=== 20th and 21st centuries ===
The 1987 Constitution of Nicaragua granted autonomy to the Zelaya Department as two autonomous regions of the North and the South Caribbean Coast. The autonomous status has allowed for the promotion and the development of the languages of the Caribbean Coast and as of 1992, there was an education in English and Spanish, as well as education in indigenous languages.

By the late 20th century, the coast was becoming more integrated economically and socially. The Creole people have now become a minority in the areas in which they had previously predominated. Many Creoles now speak mostly Spanish as well as creole and consider themselves to be only Nicaraguan. There are many Creoles who have now intermarried with mestizos even though many Creoles still protest on how they lost their political and economic power to the mestizos.

== Culture and identification ==
The Creoles of Nicaragua are said to be an Afro-Caribbean population that are mixed with Europeans, Africans and Amerindians. Their culture is influenced by West African and British roots along with mestizos and Miskito. Some food that is used in their cooking consists of coconut (in its many forms), taro root, yuca, manioc and other elements such as wheat flour and other processed foods. They have their own musical style which can be compared to West Indian calypso.

Very little literature has been produced in Nicaraguan Creole. The most regarded author has been June Beer, who was a poet, and artist. As an advocate for Nicaraguan Creole, In 2008 she was honored with an annual literary award bearing her name, the June Beer Literary Prize in Mother Tongues (Premio Literario Internacional en Lenguas Maternas "June Beer"), which is awarded to authors who produce works in indigenous or Creole languages.

== Language details ==
The Nicaraguan Creole English language is spoken as a primary first language by only 35,000 to 50,000 Creoles, Nicaraguan Garifuna, and some Miskitos. The language is being quickly replaced with Spanish with fewer and fewer people speaking it.

== See also ==
- Belizean Creole
- Jamaican Creole
- Miskito language
- Miskito people
- San Andrés–Providencia Creole

== Bibliography ==
- Ken Decker and Andy Keener. "A Report on the English-Lexifier Creole of Nicaragua, also known as Miskito Coast Creole, with special reference to Bluefields and the Corn Islands." Summer Institute of Linguistics. February 1998.
