= Miss Nicaragua 2004 =

- Date: February 28, 2004
- Presenters: Gabriel Traversari & Amelia Vega
- Venue: Teatro Nacional Rubén Darío, Managua, Nicaragua
- Broadcaster: Televicentro
- Entrants: 12
- Winner: Marifely Argüello César; Managua

The Miss Nicaragua 2004 pageant, was held on February 28, 2004 in Managua, after weeks of events. At the conclusion of the final night of competition, Marifely Argüello César from Managua won the title. She represented Nicaragua at Miss Universe 2004 held in Ecuador later that year. The rest of the finalists would enter different pageants.

== Results ==
=== Placements ===
Placement	Contestant
Miss Nicaragua 2004	Managua – Marifely Argüello César
Miss Nicaragua World 2004	Masaya – Anielka Sánchez
1st Runner-Up	Bluefields – Anasha Campbell Lewis
Top 6	La Libertad – Mariana Ortega Trejos; Tipitapa - Valeria García Dávila; La Concepcion - Laura Meléndez Howard

.

=== Special awards ===
- Most Beautiful Face - La Libertad - Mariana Ortega
- Miss Photogenic - Managua - Marifely Argüello
- Miss Congeniality - Nueva Segovia - Daisy Jirón
- Best Hair - Matagalpa - María José Barrantes
- Miss Internet - Bluefields - Anasha Campbell (by votes of Miss Nicaragua Webpage)

.

== Official Contestants ==
State	Contestant
Bluefields	Anasha Campbell Lewis
Chontales	Karla Flores Rivera
Granada	Zaida Almanza Urbina
Jinotega	Raquel Camacho Saavedra
La Concepcion	Laura Meléndez Howard
La Libertad	Mariana Ortega Trejos
Leon	Rosa Argentina Ocampo Moya
Managua	Marifely Argüello César
Masaya	Anielka Sánchez
Matagalpa	María José Barrantes Bassett
Nueva Segovia	Daisy Jirón
Tipitapa	Valeria García Dávila

== Judges ==
- Dr. Steven B. Hopping - Director of Center for Cosmetic Surgery of Washington, DC
- Mario Solano - Regional Manager of Copa Airlines
- Dra. Maria del Carmen Gonzalez - Ecuadorian Ambassador in Nicaragua
- Roberto Sanson - Regional Director of Nissan Motor Co., Ltd.
- Maria Esperanza Peralta - General Manager of Holiday Inn Managua Convention Center
- Arquimedes Gonzalez - Editor of La Prensa Magazine
- Luz Maria Sanchez - Miss Nicaragua 1996
- Elena Salazar Barquero - Assistant Editor of FEM Magazine
- Mauricio Solorzano - Operations Manager of Compañía Licorera de Nicaragua, S.A

..
