= June Beer =

Afro-Nicaraguan artist and poet

- June Beer at the 1983 Exhibition Cuatro Mujeres
- Born: June Gloria Beer Thompson; 17 May 1935; Bluefields, Nicaragua
- Died: 14 March 1986 (aged 50); Bluefields, Nicaragua
- Occupations: artist, poet
- Years active: 1969-1986
- Known for: African and feminist themes
- Notable work: The Funeral of Machismo

June Beer (1935–1986) was a Nicaraguan naïve artist, who gained national and international acclaim for her works depicting African and feminist themes. She was also the first woman poet of Nicaragua's Atlantic coast and produced works in Moskitian Creole, English and Spanish. The Nicaraguan government protected four of her paintings—Fruit Seller, In Memory of Efie Irene, They Dance and Woman Working—by declaring them as part of the national patrimony. Removing them from the country is illegal.

== Early life ==
June Gloria Beer Thompson was born on 17 May 1935 (Note: Biographers of Beer are equally divided on her birth year. Some state her birth occurred in 1933, while others show the year as 1935. Her son stated that she was born in 1935 and I have used that date based upon his familiarity.) in Bluefields, Nicaragua into a middle-class family as the youngest of eleven children. Her biological father was Abraham Moses Downs and she traveled often to visit him in Granada, where she first encountered visual arts. She was only able to attend school through the third grade, but was a prolific reader and self-taught.

== Career ==
In 1954 Beer moved to the United States, first working at a dry-cleaning business and then as an artist's model in Los Angeles, California at a variety of art schools. Dissatisfied with the work she was able to get, in 1956 she returned to Bluefields, where she raised four children as a single mother. To support her children, Beer collected bottles and plastic, sold them to recyclers in Managua and used the proceeds to buy vegetables, which she then sold to customers. She began painting as a hobby. She painted the people around her, men working in the fields or on the docks, women cleaning, cooking and washing clothes and gave them away. In 1968, she was encouraged to make her living as an artist by a Dutch ship captain, who also painted. The following year she moved to Managua to see if she could become a professional artist. She got orders and sold works, but at the end of the year, returned to Bluefield. There was no market for art on the coast, but she would paint batches and either take them to Managua for sale, or sell them to art dealers who came looking for her.

Beer’s themes are of black-skinned people and feminist commentary and at the time they were painted, were unique in these themes. They also are reflective of the times in which she lived and parallel the state of the country during the time of the Sandinista revolutionary movement. She was anti-Somoza and outspoken in her support for the rebels. Beer's activities resulted in her imprisonment by the Somoza National Guards in 1970 and again in 1971. In 1971, Beer returned for two years to the capital, in an attempt to integrate and learn from the professional artists working in Managua. She was criticized because her work was not in the style of the popular, untrained primitive artists from the Solentiname Islands who created detailed landscapes, nor was it in the style of the majority of painters in Managua, whose works were largely abstract.

In 1978 the Somoza National Guards begin a series of repression campaigns against the communities along the Atlantic Coast, and finally forced Beer to flee to Costa Rica in 1979. Two days after Somoza was toppled from power, she returned to Nicaragua 19 July 1979 and began working as the head librarian of the Bluefields Public Library. The new government, created by the Sandinista National Liberation Front (Spanish: Frente Sandinista de Liberación Nacional (FSLN)) had her make an inventory of the library's holdings and the Ministry of Culture had her establish libraries in the towns of Pearl Lagoon and Kukra Hill. In addition to her paintings, during this period, Beer was a contributor to the bi-lingual Sunrise newspaper. Her works lamented the socio-economic hardships faced by the residents of the coast. She was the first woman poet of the Mosquito Coast and wrote her poems in creole, English and Spanish.

In 1981, Beer was selected to participate in the Caribbean Festival of Arts in Barbados, taking eight paintings to display. One of the other artists commented that her skin tones were all brown, but that black-skinned people had bluish tones. She returned home and perfected through experimentation, a tone she liked which she saw as a turning point in her work. She left the library in 1983 and joined the National Visual Artists’ Union (Spanish: Unión Nacional de Artistas Plásticos de Nicaragua (UNAP) and the Sandinista Association of Cultural Workers (Spanish: Asociación Sandinista de Trabajadores Culturales (ASTC)). The following years were marked with multiple exhibits both within Nicaragua and internationally. Her paintings were shown with acclaim in Asia, the Caribbean, Europe, Mexico and the United States.

Most of Nicaragua is of indigenous and Spanish heritage, but the Mosquito Coastal region was originally a British protectorate which was incorporated in 1894 into the country of Nicaragua. The people who populate the coast are a mixture of minority populations including African Creole, Garifuna, Miskito, Rama, Sumo and Mestizo. These were the people Beer saw around her and who she depicted in both her paintings and writings, along with her social commentary of revolution and feminism. Her palette utilized bright vivid colors, but her figures were often stiff and frozen. Those same figures came to life, in her poems, vibrating with life. One painting, Sandino and the Wounded Eagle, portrayed Augusto César Sandino, who was assassinated by Somoza's forces in the 1930s, as a fallen eagle. Another, Black Sandino won first prize in a national painting competition in 1983 and portrays both black-pride and revolutionary resolve. One of her most known works, The Funeral of Machismo was a critique of the double workload that most women worldwide experience. It depicts a rooster as the central figure, to represent man, and four women at various stages of development—as a child, youth, during pregnancy and in old age—shaking their fists at the rooster. Beers described the work as reflecting the anger of women who work all day and then must come home and work again, while their husbands sit.

== Death and legacy ==
Beer died on 14 March 1986 at her home in Bluefields from a heart attack. In 1989, she was posthumously honored with the Rubén Darío Order of Cultural Independence. In August 2003 the Nicaraguan government made it illegal for four of Beer's paintings to leave the country, protecting Fruit Seller, In Memory of Efie Irene, They Dance and Woman Working as part of the national patrimony. Her paintings have been widely exhibited in collaborations by the Cultural Institute of Nicaragua with art galleries, collectors and universities. In 2008 she was honored with an annual literary award bearing her name, the June Beer Literary Prize in Mother Tongues (Spanish: Premio Literario Internacional en Lenguas Maternas “June Beer”), which is awarded to authors who produce works in indigenous or Creole languages. In 2012 the Afro-Nicaraguan “Mayo Ya” celebrations included an exhibition of her paintings at the Rubén Darío National Theater and in 2016, the Nicaraguan government dedicated the Bienal (Biennial), a fine arts cultural event sponsored by the Ministry of Culture, as a tribute to Beer. Twenty artists from Nicaragua were chosen, along with another twenty international artists from Canada, Ecuador, Germany, Italy, Mexico, Spain, Switzerland, Turkey and the United States to participate in the event which ran from February to May.
