= Monkey Point =

- Village
- Location in Nicaragua
- Coordinates: 11°36′N 83°40′W
- Country: Nicaragua
- Department: South Caribbean Coast Autonomous Region

Monkey Point (or Pim's Bay) is a village in South Caribbean Coast Autonomous Region, Nicaragua, south of Bluefields.

It is located near the site of a planned US$350 million seaport, to be financed by Iran and Venezuela. More recently American and South Korean investors have expressed interest in developing a container terminal there. This container terminal will be situated at the Caribbean end of the planned Ecocanal, which will link Monkey Point to the town of Corinto on the Pacific coast of Nicaragua.
