= Rama language =

Chibchan language of Nicaragua

Rama
- Rama
- Native to: Nicaragua
- Region: Rama Cay
- Ethnicity: Rama
- Native speakers: 740 (2009)
- Language family: Chibchan: Votic; Rama

Language codes
- ISO 639-3: rma
- Glottolog: rama1270
- ELP: Rama
- Linguasphere: 81-CAA-aa

The Rama language is one of the Indigenous languages of the Chibchan family spoken by the Rama people on the island of Rama Cay and south of lake Bluefields on the Caribbean coast of Nicaragua. Other Indigenous languages of this region include Miskito and Sumu. Rama is one of the northernmost languages of the Chibchan family. It is spoken in Honduras and Nicaragua.

The Rama language is severely endangered. Their language was described as "dying quickly for lack of use" as early as the 1860s. By 1980, the Rama were noted as having "all but lost their original ethnic language", and had become speakers of a form of English creole, called Rama Cay Creole, instead. In 1992, only approximately 36 fluent speakers could be found among an ethnic population of 649 individuals. The number of speakers on Rama Cay island was only 4 in 1992. There have been several language revitalization efforts. The fieldwork for the first dictionary of Rama was done during this time by Robin Schneider, a graduate student from the University of Berlin.

== Phonology ==
There are three basic vowel sounds: a, i and u. In addition to these, e and o have been introduced as distinct vowels in some foreign loanwords. Each vowel may be either short or long. Here the vowels are shown in standard Rama orthography (see for example Craig et al. 1988):

Vowels
	Short		Long	
	Front	Back	Front	Back
High	i	u	iː	uː
(Mid)	(e)	(o)	(eː)	(oː)
Low	a		aː	

The following consonants are found (IPA transcriptions are shown where helpful):

Consonants
		Bilabial	Alveolar	Palatal	Velar	Labiovelar	Glottal
Nasals		m	n		ŋ ⟨ng⟩	ŋʷ ⟨ngw⟩	
Plosives	voiceless	p	t		k	kʷ ⟨kw⟩	
Plosives	voiced	b	d		g		
Fricatives			s				h
Liquids			l, r				
Semivowels				j ⟨y⟩		w	

Rama words have non-predictable stress. (Note: Lehmann's vocabulary (Lehmann 1914) indicates stress; modern standard spelling does not.)

=== Phonotactics and sandhi ===
Rama phonotactics includes notable consonant clusters at the beginning of words (e.g. psaarik "toucan", tkua "hot", nkiikna "man", mlingu "killed") and word-internally (e.g. alkwsi "speaks", salpka "fish"). Variations among speakers witness a tendency to simplify such clusters (e.g. nkiikna or kiikna "man", nsu- or su- "we, us, our").

Such clusters often arise due to a tendency to omit unstressed short vowels. For example, when the third person singular subject prefix i- and the past tense suffix -u are added to the verb stem kwis "eat", thus: i- + kwis + -u, the verb stem loses its only vowel, resulting in the form ikwsu "he/she/it ate". Sometimes omitting different vowels may lead to alternative results. Adding the past tense suffix -u to the verb stem maling "kill", i.e. maling + -u, may give either mlingu or malngu "killed".

There are also cases of vowel alternation in morphemes (e.g. the first-person subject prefix may appear as n-, ni- or na-) and lexical stems (thus the stem aakar "stay" may appear in the forms aakir-i "stays" and aaikur-u "stayed", where the short stem vowel copies the vowel of the suffix).

Consonants display a degree of sandhi-type alternation, as seen for example in the final consonant of the same stem aakar "stay, be", cf. the imperative aakit "stay!". This latter variant is found both word-final and before a suffix beginning with a consonant (e.g. aakit-ka "if there is").

== Grammar ==
In terms of grammatical typology Rama may be considered a fairly "normal" language for the linguistic area within which it is located, despite the lack of close genetic ties with its immediate neighbours. For example, Rama shares some general typological features with Miskito, a dominant contact language, displaying many characteristics typical of SOV languages (even though not all sentences are actually verb-final). A single set of prefixes serves to express both pronominal possessors (e.g. n-up "my eye") and subjects (e.g. n-taaku "I went"). Noun phrase relations are indicated by postpositions, tense and subordination by verbal suffixes. (Note: Sources for the information in this section include Craig 1991, Craig et al. 1988, Lehmann 1914 and Rigby, Craig & Tibbitts 1989, and also the Rama texts in Craig, Tibbitts & Rigby 1986 and Craig et al. 1992. There are some notable differences between the earlier and more recent descriptions; cf. Craig 1991: "The discrepancy between the earlier data and that which are presented here begs the question of whether it is due to the way the data were gathered, or whether it is an indication of linguistic change, or both." For practical reasons and coherence, the present sketch focuses on the recent data found in the materials produced by the present language recovery movement.)

=== Noun phrase ===
==== Elements of the noun phrase ====
There are no articles. Nouns are frequently undetermined, e.g. Pkaak tkii su itraali "(The) lizard walks on (the) ground" (literally: lizard ground on (s)he-walks), Salpka sauk u ikuu "He/she caught (a) fish with (a) hook" (fish hook with (s)he-caught).

Demonstrative determiners precede the noun: ning nguu "this house", naming tausung "that dog". Quantifiers follow the noun: tausung saiming "one dog", puus puksak "two cats", (Note: The earliest studies of the Rama language, for example Lehmann 1911, mistakenly identified it as having classifiers; this was later demonstrated to be untrue.) nguu ngarak "many houses", tamaaski ui "every morning", kaulingdut umling "all the people", tausung saina "the other dog, another dog".

Most nouns do not change for number, but those denoting humans can take the plural suffix -dut or -lut, as in kiiknadut "men", kumaalut "women", tiiskamalut "children", etc.

Attributive adjectives follow the noun they qualify: salpka taara "(a/the) big fish".

==== Possession ====
Inalienable pronominal possession, found with body parts and characteristics, is expressed by prefixes attached to the possessed noun: nup "my eye", yausa "his/her strength", nsusuluk "our fingers". (Note: There may have been variation over time as to which nouns are treated as inalienable. For example, in modern sources maing aak "your name" is found, with aak treated as alienable, but Lehmann 1914 has maak "your name".)

In other cases (including kinship relations), a genitive pronoun (formed from the pronominal prefix + -aing) precedes the possessed noun, e.g. naing puus / nguu / aak / tiiskama / taata / tairung "my cat / house / name / child / father / sister", maing kaulingdut "your family (lit. your people)", yaing aak "his/her name", nsulaing rama kuup "our Rama language".

The forms naing, maing, yaing etc. also function predicatively (as equivalents of English possessive pronouns), as in Naming puus naing "That cat is mine".

Nominal possession is expressed by two constructions: possessor + possessed (i.e. simple juxtaposition), e.g. naing taata aak "my father's name" (my father name), and possessor + aing + possessed (aing being a genitive postposition), e.g. Nora aing nguu "Nora's house".

==== Pronouns ====
Personal pronouns have free (independent) and bound (prefix) forms as in the following table. The third person singular bound form is i- before a consonant or y- before a vowel.

Personal pronouns
	Independent	Prefix
I, me	naas, na	n-
you (sg.)	maa	m-
he/him, she/her, it	yaing	i-, y-
we, us	nsut	nsu-
you (pl.)	mlut	m- -lut
they, them	anut	an-

The independent pronouns are often used as subjects: Nah tawan ki aakar "I live in Bluefields" (I town in stay), Maa kalma apaakut? "Can you sew a dress?" (you dress sew-IRREALIS), Yaing taaki "He/She is going". They may also be complements of postpositions: Naing airung ning nguu ki aakar nah u "My mother lives in this house with me" (my mother this house in stay I with), maa kang "from you", Walsa anut su tabiu "The tiger came out at them" (tiger they at came-out). Note that -ut changes to -ul before a vowel, for example in nsul u "with us".

The prefix forms of the pronouns are used as subject prefixes with verbs: Neli aa nitangu "I gave it to Nelly" (Nelly OBJECT I-gave), Tamaik suulikaas niaukut "Tomorrow I will cook some meat" (tomorrow meat I-will-cook), Taa u mtaaku? "With whom did you go?" (who with you-went), Itaaku "he/she went", Ipang su ansiiku "They came to the island" (island in they-came). In the second person plural, m- is prefixed and -lut suffixed to the verb.

Subject prefixes are omitted when the subject is represented by an independent pronoun: "I am going" is either Nah taaki or Ntaaki, "He is going" is either Yaing taaki or Itaaki, etc. They are also commonly absent in the presence of a full subject noun phrase: Naing taata taaki "My father is going", but "repetition" of the subject is also possible: Pkaak tkii su itraali "The lizard (he) walks on the ground" (lizard ground on it-walks).

A pronominal object is expressed by adding the postposition aa to the pronouns, which adopt the prefix form in the singular but the full form in the plural: naa, maa, yaa but nsula (for nsut + -a) etc. But third person objects are commonly zero-marked, that is, the absence of an overt object of a transitive verb implies an understood "him", "her" or "it", e.g. Anangsku "They cleaned it" (lit. they-cleaned).

The demonstrative pronouns are the same as the corresponding determiners: ning "this", naming "that", as in Ning naing nguu "This is my house".

The interrogative pronouns are niku "what", taa "who", as in Niku maing aak? "What is your name?", Taa rama kuup alkwsi? "Who speaks Rama?" (who Rama language speaks), Taa u mtaaku? "With whom did you go?" (who with you-went).

==== Postpositions ====
Rama postpositions perform roughly the same functions as English prepositions, as in tkii su "on the ground", tawan ki "in (the) town", nah u "with me", nguu aing "of the house", etc.

Postpositional phrases may occur either before or after the verb. Some postpositions have a shorter and a longer form; following the verb the long forms are used, e.g. Nangalbiu naing taata kang "I ran away from my father" (I-ran my father from) but before the verb the short forms are more usual: Naing taata ka nangalbiu (my father from I-ran).

Postpositions
Long form	Short form	Meaning or function
aak	aa	object marker
aing		"of, for", genitive
bang	ba	"to, for"
isii		"like"
kama		"for"
kang	(i)ka	"from"
ki		"in, on, at, to"
king	ki	"for"
su		"in, on, at, to"
u		"with"

Although aak or aa is given as an object marker, most objects (other than personal pronouns) take no postposition, e.g. Kruubu kiikna kwisu "The tiger ate the man" (tiger man ate).

In addition to the simple postpositions there are more complex forms of the relational type that express more specific relationships. These are composed of a noun-like lexical form followed by a postposition, such as psutki "inside", karka "out of". They are placed after a noun phrase, e.g. ngurii psutki "inside the hole", or a postpositional phrase, e.g. ung su karka "out of the pot" (literally: pot in out-from). Such expressions may also be used adverbially.

=== The verb ===
==== Overview ====
The simplest structure for verb forms consists of these elements:

1. an optional **subject prefix** (already discussed above under Pronouns)
2. the verb **stem**
3. either a **tense/mood** suffix (or zero) or a **subordination** marker

e.g. Nah tawan ki aakar "I live in Bluefields" (no subject prefix and no tense suffix), Yaing taak-i "He/She is going" (no subject prefix, present tense suffix), Taa u m-taak-u? "With whom did you go?" (second person subject prefix, past tense suffix), Suulikaas ni-auk-ut "I will cook some meat" (first person subject prefix, future/irrealis suffix), kruubu an-sung-ka "when they see the tiger" (third person plural subject prefix, "when" subordinator), Nah suulikaas baalpi ni-paya-kama "I am looking for meat to buy" (first person singular subject prefix, purpose subordinator).

This basic structure may be expanded by adding other elements, including aspect markers (which come between the stem and the tense/mood suffix) and preverbs (which precede the subject prefix, if present). More complex meanings can be expressed through the use of serial verb constructions.

==== Tense/mood and subordinator suffixes ====
Most verb forms end in a suffix such as one of the following which either specifies a tense (or a mood) or else signals a subordinate clause: (Note: The table does not aim to be exhaustive but covers the most basic options.)

Tense/mood and subordinator suffixes
Tense/mood suffixes		Subordinator suffixes	
Suffix	Meaning	Suffix	Meaning
-i	present tense	-bang	"in order to"
-u	past tense	-ka	"when, if"
-ut	future/irrealis	-kama	"in order to"
no suffix	tenseless/habitual	-kata	"if"
no suffix	imperative	-su	"upon, and then, since"

Use of one of the subordinator suffixes constitutes the main subordination strategy. Since these suffixes occupy the same place as the tense suffixes, the resulting subordinate clauses are tenseless, in this respect resembling non-finite clauses in European languages. Nonetheless, Rama verb forms with subordinators take subject prefixes under the same basic conditions as tensed ones, and in this way resemble finite forms.

Examples with siik "come": nsiiki "I am coming", nsiiku "I came", nsiikut "I will come", nsiikbang "for me to come", nsiikka "when I come", nsiikkata "if I come" etc.

In some cases the lack of any suffix signals a lack of marked tense or a habitual sense: compare Ntaakkama aakari "I am ready to go" (now) with Nah tawan ki aakar "I live in the town". Imperatives in the second person singular are also suffixless, e.g. Siik! "Come!" One verb, taak "go", has a suppletive imperative mang! or bang! "go!".

Sometimes forms with the -bang suffix are used in independent clauses: see the section on Aspect below.

==== Aspect ====
Using the simple past tense of kwis "eat", the sentence Kruubu kiikna kwisu means "The tiger ate the man", but the "manner of eating" may be specified further to express completion of the action by adding to the stem kwis the aspect marker -atkul, giving Kruubu kiikna kwisatkulu "The tiger ate the man all up". Further examples with -atkul- are: Dor yakaangatkulu "He/she shut the door tight" (akaang "close") and Paalpa ansungatkulu "They saw the whole manatee" (sung "see"). Another aspect-marking suffix similarly used is -atkar (-itkr-) expressing repetition.

A range of further aspectual nuances may be conveyed by a variety of periphrastic constructions. Several of these involve the verb aakar "stay" or its derivative baakar (which contains the preverb ba-), either of which, following a verb stem, may convey progressive aspect: Nah paun baakiri "I am crying" (paun "cry"; the second vowel in aakar can copy the vowel of the suffix). Baakar can also express "be about to (do something)".

The suffix -bang (see also above) may express intention, as in Tiiskama nitanangbang "I am going to look at the baby" (tanang "look at"), and in first person plural imperatives (i.e. "let's..."), as in Nsukamibang! "Let's sleep!" (kami "sleep"). In the latter use the subject prefix may be omitted, e.g. Rama kuup alkwisbang! "Let's speak Rama!" (alkwis "speak").

A form related to bang, bating, means "want" with a nominal object, as in Sumuu ibatingi "He/she wants a banana", but with verbal complements means "be going to (do something)" in the simple form, as in Itraat batingi "He/she is going to walk" (traat "walk"), or "get ready to (do something)" in the progressive baakar construction, as in Nalngu bating baakiri "I get ready to drink" (alngu "drink").

Another periphrasis, constructed with aakar following the subordinate form in -kama of the main verb, expresses "be ready to (do something)", e.g. Ntaakkama aakari "I am ready to go" (taak "go").

One other means of expressing aspectual (or mood) nuances is provided by the use of a second set of emphatic tense suffixes which replace the simple suffixes, namely -aing emphatic affirmative, -uing habitual past and -uting emphatic future.

==== Modality ====
Modal notions are expressed by further periphrastic constructions. A verb with the -kama suffix may be used in an independent clause to convey obligation: Tiiskiba umling taakkama skuul ki "All the children must go to school". Ikar is used as a modal auxiliary of volition, as in Nah rama kuup larn tang ikri "I want to learn Rama" (larn tang "learn"). Ability may be expressed by the future/irrealis tense form in -ut, e.g. Maa kalma apaakut? "Will/can you sew a dress?" Inability is expressed by the negator angka preceding the complete verb, e.g. Nah rama kuup angka alkwsi "I cannot speak Rama".

==== Preverbs ====
Rama has preverbs which form constructions comparable to English phrasal verbs such as "run away", "come over", "carry on" etc. The Rama preverbs resemble some of the postpositions in form: they are ba-, yu-, ka-, su- and yaa-. Like English phrasal verbs, the meanings and uses of Rama preverb constructions can be quite idiomatic and unpredictable. Preverbs precede the subject prefix if present: Kanangalbiu "I ran away from (him/her)" (ngalbi "run" with the preverb ka- "from": -na- is the subject prefix). Ngulkang tawan ki yuansiiku "They brought the wild pig to the town" (yu-siik "come with, i.e. bring"). Tiiskama taa yutaaku? "Who took the child?" (yu-taak "go with, i.e. take").

While many preverb-verb combinations are lexically specified, yu- may also be used productively to express an instrumental argument, e.g. Nainguku kiskis nsukuaakari, suulikaas yunsuaukkama "That's why we have tongs, in order to roast meat with (them)" (therefore tongs we-have, meat for-we-roast-with).

==== Serial verbs ====
A limited range of serial-type constructions are found. A notable case of this is the use of the verb traal "walk" following another verb, as in: Ipang ika kiikna paalpa baanalpi traali lakun aik "Men of Rama Cay go to look for manatee in the lagoon" (island from man manatee they-seek walk lagoon side). The morphological analysis of baanalpi traali "they go to look for" is: ba-an-alpi traal-i (PREVERB-they-seek walk-PRESENT).

=== Sentence ===
==== 'Be' and 'have' ====
Noun and adjective predicates are constructed without a copula, in the order Subject + Predicate, e.g. Ning naing nguu "This is my house" (this my house), Yaing aak Basilio "His name is Basilio" (his name Basilio), Paalpa suuli taara "The manatee is a big animal" (manatee animal big), Naing nguu aakwaala "My house is pretty" (my house pretty); so also Naming puus naing "That cat is mine" and Naing puus suuk mlingkama "My cat is for killing rats". The Subject + Predicate order is inverted in a question such as Niku yaing aak? "What is his name?"

The verb aakar "stay" is used to express "be (in a place)" and "be (in a state)", as in Skuul saud aap su aakar "The school is on the south side" (school south side in stay), Nah mliika aakar "I am fine" (I well stay). Aakar can also mean "live (in a place)" as in Nah ipang su aakar "I live on Rama Cay" (I island in stay), and "there is" as in Nguu ngarak ipang su aakar "There are many houses on Rama Cay" (house many island in stay).

The verb kuaakar (or kwaakar) means "have", e.g. Nah nising puksak kuaakar "I have two sisters" (I sister two have), Nainguku kiskis nsukuaakari "That's why we have tongs", Puupu kwiik ngarak ikuaakari "The octopus has many arms".

==== Word order with verbal predicates ====
In sentences with a verb as predicate, the basic order is:

- SV if intransitive, e.g. Sukmurk tkari "The frog jumps", Nah paun baakiri "I am crying" (I cry AUXILIARY), Naing tiiskama almlingi "My child is sick" (my child is-sick)
- SOV if transitive (assuming that both arguments are present as noun phrases in the utterance), e.g. Kruubu kiikna kwisu "The tiger ate the man" (tiger man ate), Nora rama kuup alkwsi "Nora speaks Rama" (Nora Rama language speaks), Nah tausung saiming kuaakar "I have one dog" (I dog one have).

Other sentence elements (in bold here) may be placed:

- in front of the verb: Pkaak **tkii su** itraali "The lizard walks **on the ground**", Tulkumas **ituk u** naayarnguli "The scorpion bites **with its tail**", **Ipang su** ansiiku "They came **to the island**", Nguu ngarak **ipang su** aakar "There are many houses **on the island**", **Nah u** alkwis! "Speak **with me**!", Nah **yaabra aap su** aapunu "I grew up **on the south side**", Naas **sii ba** taak ikar "I don't want to go **for water**", Salpka taara **sauk u** ikuu "He caught a big fish **with a hook**", Kruubu **tamaaski ui** tabii "The tiger came out **every morning**".
- at the end of the sentence (i.e. after the verb): Nsut rama larn tangi **Nora u** "We are learning Rama **with Nora**", Naing airung ning nguu ki aakar **nah u** "My mother lives in this house **with me**", Nkiikna ngulkang malngi **twiis u** "The man kills the wari **with a lance**", Maa kalma apaakut **naing isii**? "Can you sew a dress **like mine**?", Naing taata ngabang yuisiiku **nguu ki** "My father brings the silkgrass **into the house**", kiskis yuisiikka **nguu ki** "when he brings the tongs **into the house**", yupsi tabii **ung su karka** "when the oil comes **out of the pot**".
- or at the beginning of the sentence: **Ipang su** nah maktungu "I was born **on Rama Cay**", **Ngurii psutki** yaing tiiskama yuitaaki "She took the child **inside the hole**", **Ung ariis ba** upsi ankai "They put the oil **in the empty pot**", **Tamaik** suulikaas niaukut "**Tomorrow** I will cook meat".

Clausal elements (i.e. those containing a verb) usually follow the main verb, e.g. Nah taaki ai nipiabang "I am going to plant corn", Nah suulikaas baalpi nipayakama "I am looking for meat to buy", Mliika anaakar paalpa analkuka "They are happy when they hear about the manatee".

==== Questions ====
Yes/no questions take the same form as the corresponding statement, e.g. Maing nguu taara? "Is your house big?", Maa ipang su aakar? "Do you live on Rama Cay?", Maa rama kuup alkwsi? "Do you speak Rama?", Maa nising kuaakar? "Have you a sister?", Maa kalma apaakut naing isii? "Can you sew a dress like mine?" Such questions may be answered using Aha "Yes" or Mahaling "No".

Some question words (sometimes called wh-words):

Some question words
Pronouns	niku	"what"
Pronouns	taa	"who"
Adverbs	ngarangki, ngarangsu	"where"
Adverbs	niika bii	"how"

Question words may be preceded by another sentence constituent as topic, e.g. Tiiskama taa yutaaku? "Who took the child?" (child who took), Maa, ngarangki aakar? "And you, where do you live?" (you, where live).

However, question words generally stand at the beginning of the sentence: Ngarangki maa aakar? "Where do you live?" (where you live), Ngarangki ngulkang aakar? "Where does the wari live?" (where wari lives), Ngarangki Nora aing nguu aakar? "Where is Nora's house?" (where Nora GENITIVE house stay), Ngarangsu yaing taaki? "Where is he/she going?" (where he/she goes), Ngarangsu yaing taata taaki? "Where is his/her father going?" (where his/her father goes), Taa nsulaing rama kuup alkwsi? "Who speaks our Rama language?" (who our Rama language speaks), Taa u mtaaku? "With whom did you go?" (who with you-went).

Questions words with a non-verbal predicate: Niku maing aak? "What is your name?", Niika bii maing kaulingdut? "How is your family?"

==== Negation ====
Sentences may be negated by placing taama after the verb or predicate, e.g. Nah ipang su aakar taama "I do not live on Rama Cay", Maa rama kuup alkwsi taama "You do not speak Rama", Naing nguu taara taama "My house is not big", Naming tausung naing taama "That dog is not mine", or by placing aa before the verb, e.g. Paalpa aa baanalpiu "They didn't look for the manatee", Naas aa taak ikar "I don't want to go".

There is a special negative word, angka, to express impossibility, e.g. Nah angka aakar tawan ki "I cannot live in Bluefields".

==== Coordination and subordination ====
Coordinating conjunctions: an "and", barka "but": Naing nising an naing tairung ning nguu ki aakar nah u "My sister and my brother live in this house with me", Nah tausung saiming kuaakar an maa puus puksak kuaakar "I have one dog and you have two cats", Naing nguu taara taama, barka aakwaala "My house is not big, but it is pretty".

Subordinate clauses may be formed by means of subordinator suffixes as described above. Reported speech is formed by juxtaposition as in Anaapiu anaungi "They found it, they say" (aapi "find", aung "say"). Relative clauses also have no specific subordinator but the clause marker kaing may be employed, e.g. Suulikaas nipaayau kaing Neli aa nitangu "The meat I bought, I gave it to Nelly" (meat I-bought kaing Nelly OBJECT I-gave).

== Lexicon ==
Rama has borrowed words from Miskito (e.g. taara "big"), English, Rama Cay Creole and Spanish. (Note: Words possibly borrowed from Miskito include some that Miskito ultimately borrowed from English, e.g. tawan "town". There are probably also numerous Miskito calques in Rama, such as preya aing nguu "church", cf. Miskito prias watla.) Besides such loans, Rama has a primary lexicon of Chibchan origin, expanded through various word-formation processes.

Many verb stems are made up of extensions from primary roots by the addition of one of the prefixes al- and aa-, which often correlate with intransitive and transitive meanings respectively. Evident intransitive derivation with al- is illustrated by the pairs maling "kill" : almaling "die", aark : alaark "break (tr./intr.)" and auk : alauk "roast (tr./intr.)", while other cases of outward resemblance are semantically opaque, e.g. kwis "eat" and alkwis "speak", or involve more complex relationships, e.g. aap (i.e. aa- + p) "find" and baalp (ba- [preverb] + al + p "seek".

Verbs may be derived from other parts of speech by suffixing one of several verbal roots glossed as "do, make", such as -king, -ting and -uung.

A common adjective-forming suffix is -ba, while the participial suffix -ima gives rise to both adjectives and nouns.

Certain recurrent endings found in numerous noun stems appear to correspond to vague semantic classes. A notable example is -up, which occurs as the last component in nouns many of which denote round objects, fruits or body parts. As an inalienable noun in its own right, -up means "eye" or "seed".

Composition is another common way of forming nouns, as in suulikaas "meat" (from suuli "animal" + kaas "flesh") or the inalienable noun -upulis "eyelash" (from -up "eye" + ulis "hair").

New concepts can also be expressed syntactically, e.g. through genitive constructions such as preya aing nguu "church" (lit. house of prayer), or through verbal paraphrase.

Partial or complete reduplication is seen in the forms of some words, including onomatopoeics such as tahtah "dripping", animal names like ngaukngauk "spider" or tkwustkwus "rabbit", colour names and other descriptive adjectives such as nuknuknga "yellow", ngarngaringba "green", siksiknga "speckled", kingkingma "calm", and others, e.g. tiskitiski "a little".

Some recorded words that were claimed to be from the Corobicí language are actually from a dialect of Rama spoken in the region of Upala.
