= Anasha Campbell =

Nicaraguan politician

Minister for Tourism
- Appointed by: Daniel Ortega

Personal details
- Born: 1984 (age 41–42) Bluefields, Nicaragua
- Education: National Autonomous University of Nicaragua
- Awards: Miss Nicaragua (runner-up), 2004

Shantanny Anasha Campbell Lewis (born 1984) is a Nicaraguan politician who is co-director of the Nicaraguan Institute of Tourism and Minister of Tourism of Nicaragua. She is the first person of African descent to hold that ministerial role.

== Early life and education ==
Born in Bluefields, Nicaragua, in 1984, Campbell has creole heritage. She studied at the Moravian College there and completed higher education in Managua. She holds a degree in International Relations and a PhD in Social Sciences, the latter from the National Autonomous University of Nicaragua. She is member of the Nicaraguan Campbell dynasty, which has been accused of nepotism and corruption.

== Career ==
In 2004 she was chosen Miss Bluefields and participated in the national Miss Nicaragua pageant, where she was first runner-up. By 2010 she was working for CARICOM (the Caribbean Community Organisation) as a policy advisor. In 2013, she was appointed by the Central American Tourism Council as Secretary of Central American Tourism Integration, a position she held for four years. In 2015, she was appointed co-director of the Nicaraguan Tourism Institute. In 2020, on behalf of the Nicaraguan government, she assumed the pro tempore presidency of the Central American Tourism Council and Board of Directors of the Central American Tourism Promotion Agency for a period of six months.

Campbell is Minister of Tourism of Nicaragua. She is the first person of African descent to hold that ministerial role.
