= Panga (skiff) =

Fishing boat

The panga is a type of modest-sized, open, outboard-powered, fishing boat common throughout much of the developing world, including Central America, the Caribbean, parts of Africa, the Middle East, and much of Asia. The original panga design was developed by Yamaha as part of a World Bank project circa 1970. Pangas are commonly operated directly off beaches. The name comes from the panga fish, which is commonly netted. The upswept bow of the boat resembles the machete or knife called a panga.

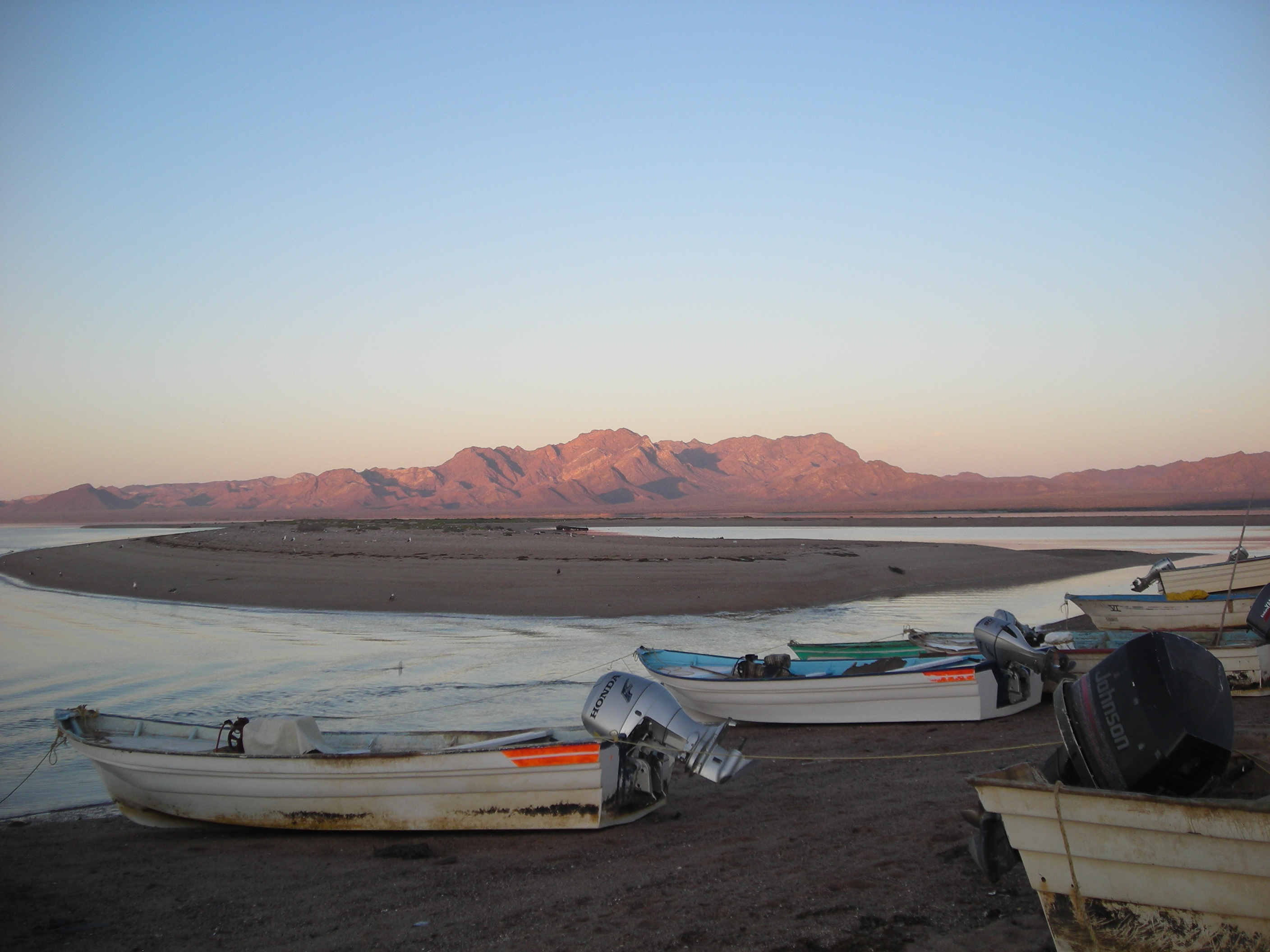
Photo of pangas at Tiburón Island by Steve Marlett.

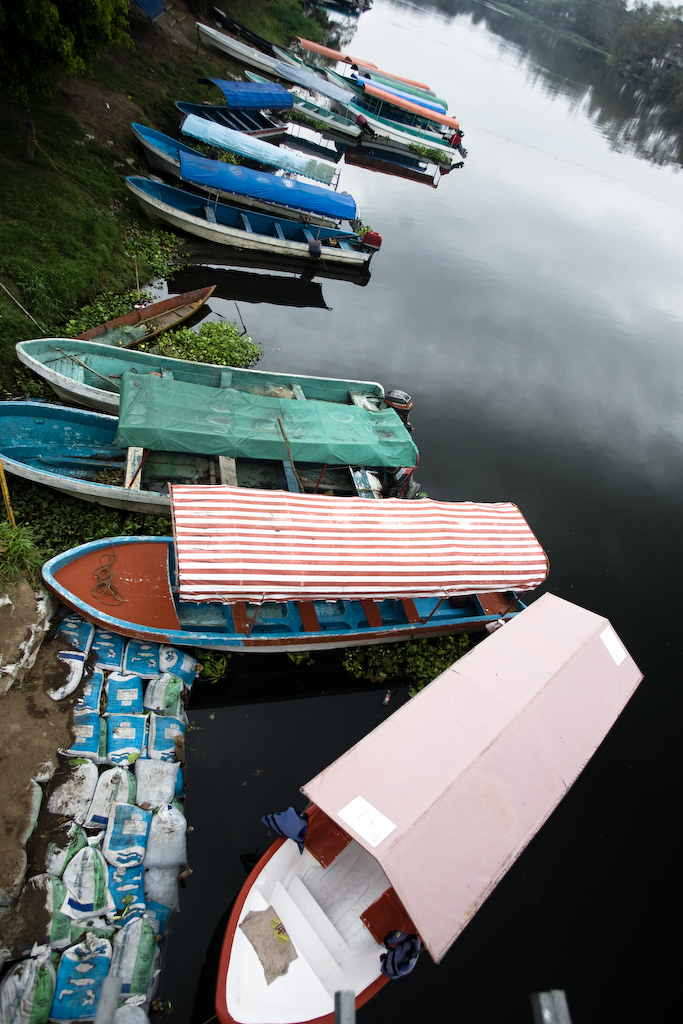
Photo of pangas at La Antigua River, Mexico, by Philo Nordlund.

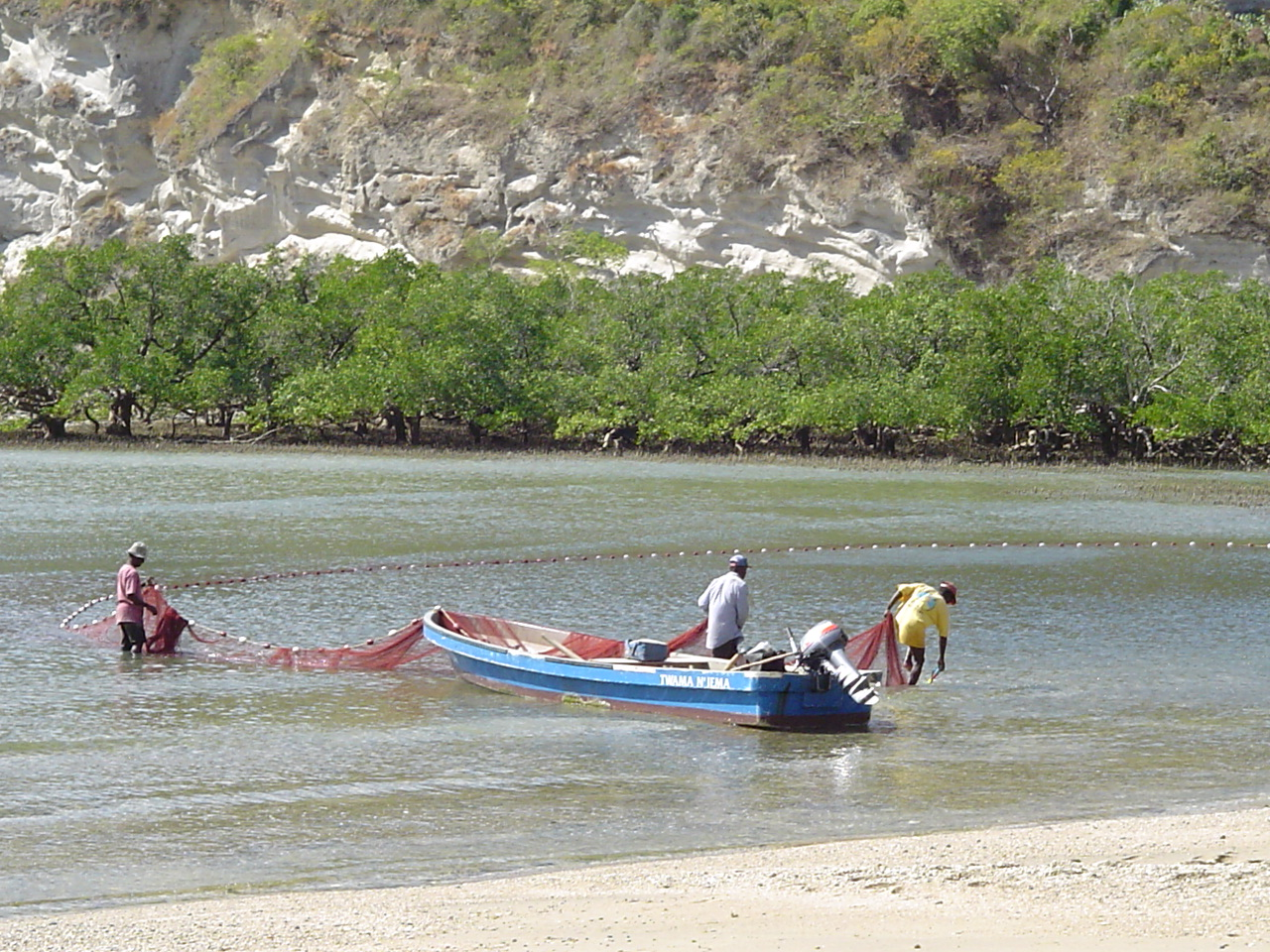
Photo of a panga in the Comoros Islands by M. Wanasimba.

Key features of the panga design are a high bow, narrow waterline beam, a delta shaped running surface, and a flotation bulge along the gunwale, or top edge of the hull. The high bow provides buoyancy for retrieving heavy nets, and minimizes spray coming over the bow. The narrow beam allows the hull to be propelled by a modest outboard motor.

The original Yamaha panga design had a length of 22 feet (6.7 m), and a waterline beam of approximately 5 feet 6 inches (1.7 m). The flotation bulge at the gunwale increased the overall beam to approximately 6 feet 6 inches (2.0 m).

Pangas are usually between 19 and 28 feet (5.8 and 8.5 m) in length, with capacities ranging from 1 to 5 short tons (0.89 to 4.46 long tons; 0.91 to 4.54 t) and powered by outboard motors of between 45 and 200 hp (34 and 149 kW). Their planing hulls are capable of speeds of more than 35 knots (40 mph; 65 km/h).

The hulls are made of fiberglass or fibre-reinforced plastic, heavily reinforced by numerous bulkheads, and usually have bow and stern enclosed flotation compartments.

== Variations ==
Various boat manufacturers have created designs either based on or inspired by the original panga design, some with more modern amenities than the original panga skiff.
