= La Concepción, Nicaragua =

La Concepción
- Municipality
- Location in Nicaragua
- Coordinates: 11°56′N 86°11′W
- Country: Nicaragua
- Department: Masaya

Government
  - Mayor: Manuel Mercado Navas

Area
  - Municipality: 25.4 sq mi (65.7 km^{2})

Population (2022 estimate)
  - Municipality: 45,055
  - Density: 1,780/sq mi (686/km^{2})
  - Urban: 18,694
- Climate: Aw

La Concepción (Spanish pronunciation: [la konseβˈsjon]) is a town and a municipality in the Masaya department of Nicaragua.
