= Rama people =

Rama
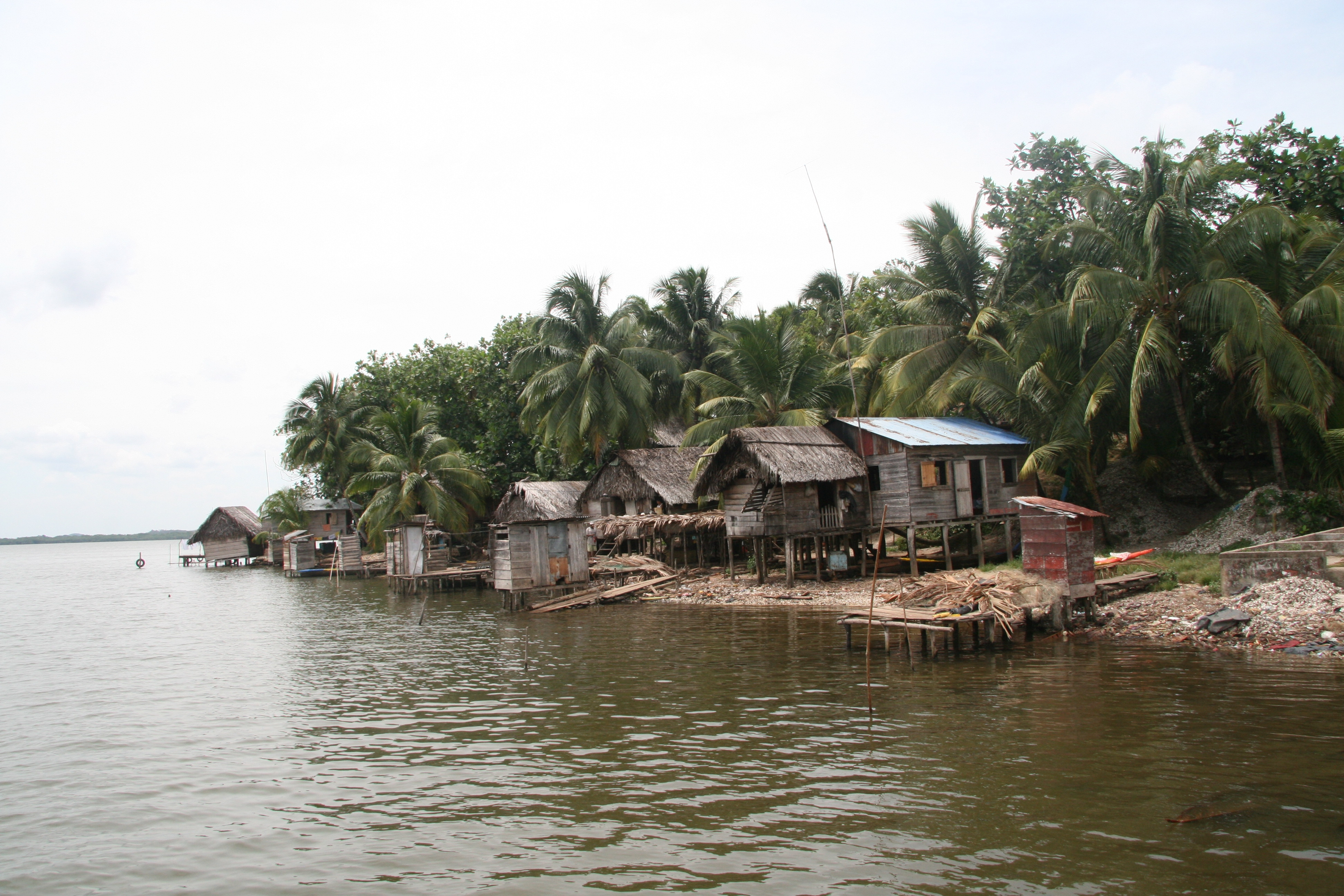
- Rama Cay, 2010

Total population
- approximately 2000

Regions with significant populations
- Nicaragua

Languages
- Rama, Spanish, Rama Cay Creole

Religion
- predominantly Moravian

Related ethnic groups
- Miskito (culturally), Guna (linguistically)

The Rama are an Indigenous people living on the eastern coast of Nicaragua. Since the start of European colonization, the Rama population has declined as a result of disease, conflict, and loss of territory. In recent years, however, the Rama population has increased to around 2,000 individuals. A majority of the population lives on the island of Rama Cay, which is located in the Bluefields Lagoon. Additional small Rama communities are dispersed on the mainland from Bluefields to Greytown. The Rama are one of three main indigenous groups on Nicaragua's Caribbean coast.

Due to centuries of colonial suppression the Rama people's native language is facing extinction. Language revitalization efforts have been made in recent years and have achieved early success in Rama communities. Rama territory is currently being threatened by the Nicaraguan government and foreign investors, who are seeking to develop a transoceanic canal and to extract resources from the region.

== Rama communities ==
The vast majority of the indigenous Rama population inhabit the island of Rama Cay. Sumu Kaat, Tiktik Kaanu, Wiring Cay, Monkey Point, Bangkukuk Taik, Corn River, Punta Gorda, and Cane Creek are recognized as predominantly Rama communities on the mainland.

== History ==
The Rama people are descendants of a combination of indigenous communities that occupied the Caribbean coast of Nicaragua at the time of European contact. Following Spanish colonization of the region, British pirates formed an alliance with the Miskitu in order to gain control of portions of the Caribbean coast. The Miskitu assisted the British pirates in raiding Spanish ships and resisting Spanish control of the region in exchange for guns and other resources that allowed them to exert control over other indigenous groups like the Rama. According to Rama oral tradition, the Miskitu gifted the island of Rama Cay to them in the 18th century in recognition of their help in fighting the Teribe people of Costa Rica.

Throughout the 19th and 20th centuries the indigenous peoples of the Caribbean coast came to rely upon private investment and enterprises for socio-economic stability. In adherence to socialist policies, the Sandinista-dominated Nicaraguan government in the 1980s sought to nationalize all private institutions, which resulted in a reduction of private investment on the Caribbean coast. Many indigenous groups resented the government for its interference in the indigenous economy and regional autonomy. The Rama people were one of many indigenous groups to join the Contras, a group of anticommunist guerrillas, some of whom were backed by the CIA, dedicated to fighting the Sandinista regime. As a result of the Nicaraguan Revolution, many Rama were displaced from their homes and traditional lands.

In an effort to return peace to the Caribbean coast, the Nicaraguan government established the Constitution of 1987 and the Autonomy Statue. These government initiatives recognized indigenous existence in Nicaragua, the right of indigenous peoples to determine their own ethnic identity, and the right of indigenous communities to offer intercultural education in their traditional language. Due to political conflict in the nation, the regulation terms of the Autonomy Statue were not ratified until 2003. Implementation of the Autonomy Statue continues to remain a challenge, because the national government and regional councils disagree over the level of autonomy the Caribbean communities should possess.

== Lifestyle ==
The Rama culture is dependent upon traditional self-sufficient strategies in order to obtain desired substances. While some Rama engage in small-scale commercial fishing, a majority of the population still practices traditional occupations such as subsistence fishing and subsistence farming. Mutual assistance is an important practice in Rama communities and is relied upon for cultural and economic stability. Sexual division of labor exists among the Rama, with males responsible for hunting, fishing, and planting, while the females partake in gathering and domestic duties. Prior to the arrival of missionaries, the Rama population on Rama Cay reportedly lived in homes lacking exterior and interior walls.

Poor soil conditions in the rainforest do not allow for extensive agriculture, so like other indigenous populations in the region the Rama cultivate small fields along river banks. Crops harvested by the Rama include bananas, plantains, corn, rice, beans, coconuts, pineapple, breadfruit, and pejibaye. Fishing contributes significantly to the Rama diet, which consists of oysters, cockles, freshwater shrimp, coppermouth, and snook. Hunting is practiced primarily on the mainland where important game animals such as white-lipped peccary, tapir, and deer can be found. The Rama people are commonly known for their skill in crafting dories and for their reputation of being the best navigators on the coast.

== Religion ==
In 1847 German Moravian missionaries started work in Bluefields, Nicaragua. The missionaries worked with the different ethnic groups and became a firmly established colonial institution on the Caribbean coast. The first Moravian mission was established on Rama Cay in 1858 and contributed to the shift away from traditional practices and the use of the Rama language. The Rama people initially resisted the efforts of the missionaries because the church's values conflicted with traditional Rama culture; however, as they dissociated from their traditional identity, the Rama became more receptive to outside influences. Today the Rama people predominantly practice in the Moravian Church. Individuals in the southeastern portion of Nicaragua alone make up 96% of the membership of the Moravian Church in Nicaragua.

== Language ==
The Rama language is part of the Chibchan family and is considered moribund since less than 30 elders can still speak the language fluently. Playing an important role in colonizing the region, the Moravian Church was a major force behind the loss of the Rama Language on Rama Cay. The Church taught English to the natives and influenced the formation of a negative attitude towards traditional speakers, resulting in the reference to Rama as the "Tiger language". As a result of this animosity, the population that inhabits Rama Cay today speaks a unique version of Rama-Creole which is similar to Creole English. Only two individuals are thought to still speak traditional Rama on the island. The Rama language had previously been preserved in mainland communities; however, modern developments are threatening the loss of traditional customs and the language.

In 1985 the Rama Language Program (RLP) was launched in response to requests to "save the Rama language". Initial efforts to locate and communicate with native speakers proved challenging for linguists because the inhabitants of Rama Cay still rejected any use of the Rama language. In recent years language revitalization efforts have achieved some success, as the Rama people move increasingly to associate their traditional language with their identity. This movement by the indigenous Rama to reclaim their language has led many speakers to label the language as "rescued".

== Status ==
Nicaragua is one of the poorest nations in the Western Hemisphere, and Nicaragua's Caribbean coast suffers from an exceptional amount of economic underdevelopment and poverty. Rama who reside in urban areas such as Bluefields suffer from discrimination and unemployment due to their ethnic identity. Unemployment levels are especially high for women and youth in this Caribbean coast region.

=== Land rights ===
The Rama people currently occupy the South Caribbean Coast Autonomous Region (RACCS). Both this region and the North Caribbean Coast Autonomous Region (RACCN) were established with the 1987 Constitution and Autonomy law. These statutes recognize collective forms of indigenous land ownership and establish terms for natural resource management. Implementation of indigenous autonomy has proved to be difficult due to internecine conflict and lack of government support. The RACCN and RACCS make up approximately half of the nation's landmass, while Caribbean coast inhabitants make up only ten percent of the nation's population.

Social disruption resulting from the civil war in the 1980s has advanced colonization along Nicaragua's agricultural frontier. Former combatants and mestizo families displaced by the war are migrating east to renew their former lives and engage in subsistence farming. Due to the poor quality of rainforest soil and increasing social unrest on the Pacific coast, more individuals move east each year and come into contact with indigenous communities. Much of central and eastern Nicaragua is protected rainforest, yet the government lacks the resources to halt the extensive environment destruction associated with the recent migrations. The advancing agricultural frontier is responsible for large amounts of deforestation and ecological devastation in the region.

==== Interoceanic canal ====
The Nicaraguan government has long sought out investors to finance the building of a Nicaraguan interoceanic canal. The Chinese company Hong Kong Nicaragua Canal Development Investment Co Ltd (HKND) was contracted in 2013 to build the canal for the cost of $40–$50 billion. Investors and the Nicaraguan government hope that the new canal will rival the Panama Canal and will be able to accommodate larger size ships and the growing demand for inter-ocean passage. The canal is expected to run from Punta Gordon on the Caribbean coast to Brito on the Pacific coast, traveling through Lake Nicaragua. Construction for the canal began in December 2014 and the project is expected to be completed by 2019. Indigenous populations are protesting the building of this canal on the grounds that they were not consulted prior to a contract being negotiated with HKND by the Nicaraguan government. Construction of the canal would require the relocation of 80% of the indigenous Rama population and would destroy traditional communal life for many other indigenous communities. International groups are protesting construction of the canal because they fear the environmental impact that the project will have on Nicaragua's endangered species and delicate ecosystem. Despite controversy surrounding the project, the Nicaraguan government is going ahead with the canal's construction, hoping the infrastructure and revenue that the canal brings in will lift the nation out of poverty.
