= Rama Cay Creole =

Creole spoken on the island of Rama Cay

- Native to: Nicaragua
- Region: Rama Cay
- Native speakers: (630 cited 1989)
- Language family: English Creole: Atlantic; Western; Miskito Coast Creole; Rama Cay Creole

Language codes
- ISO 639-3: –
- Linguist List: bzk-ram
- Glottolog: None
- IETF: bzk-u-sd-nias

Rama Cay Creole is a Creole language spoken by some 800 to 900 people on the island of Rama Cay in eastern Nicaragua. It is based on Miskito Coast Creole with additional elements of the Chibchan language Rama and purportedly some elements of English spoken with a German accent. The creolization of the language is supposed to have happened when Moravian missionaries who were native Germans but preached in English encouraged the Rama-speaking population of the island to shift to English.
