= Rama Cay =

Island in Nicaragua

Coordinates: 11°53′N 83°48′W

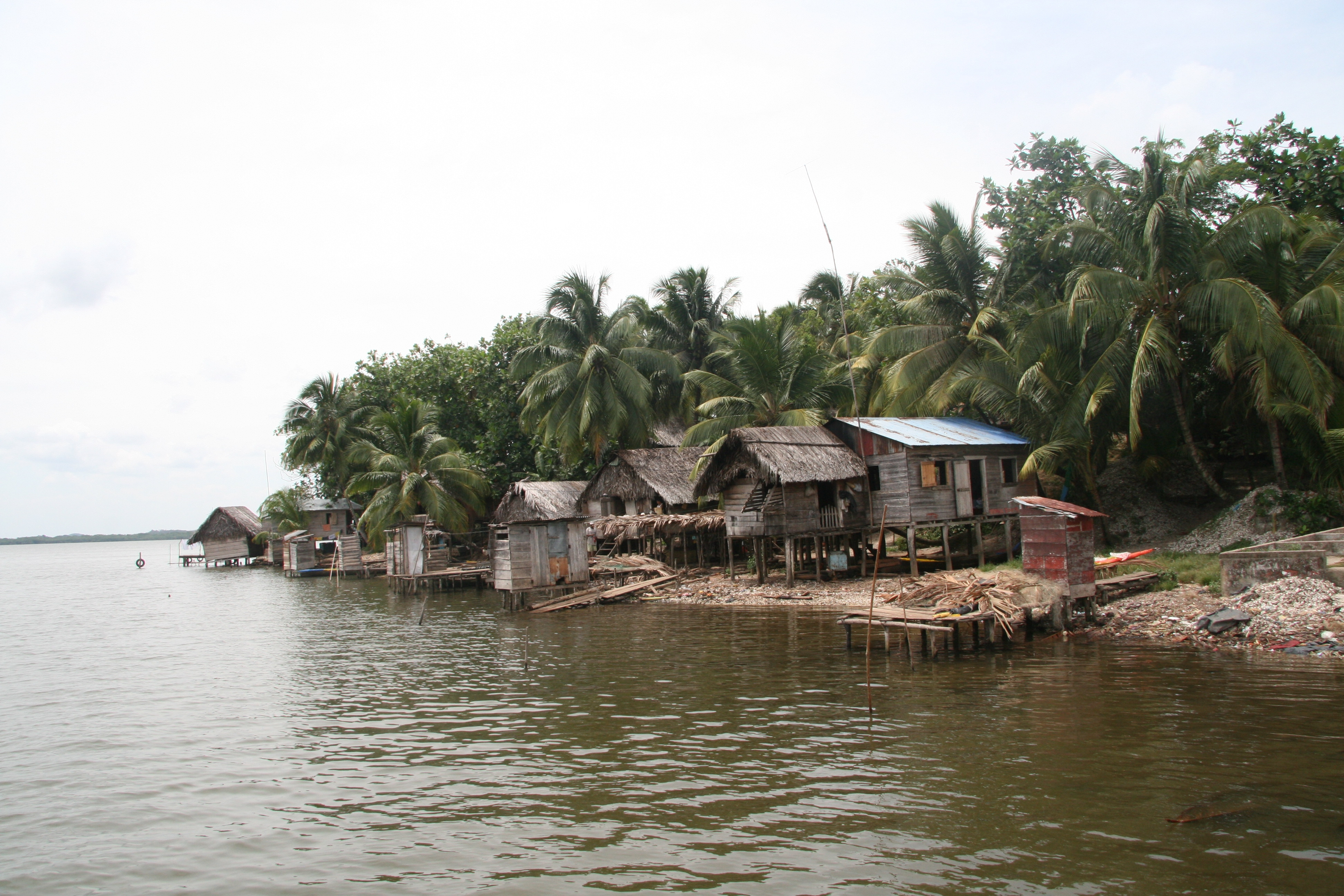
View of Rama Cay, Nicaragua

Rama Cay is an island in the Bluefields Lagoon on the eastern coast of Nicaragua. During the 17th or 18th century, the more powerful Miskito awarded the island to the Rama people in recognition of their assistance in fighting off the Naso people.

When a Moravian mission was established on the island in 1857, the Rama began what would become a general shift to using an English-based creole language in lieu of their traditional Rama language.
