= Bluefields =

City in Mosquito Coast, Nicaragua

Bluefields Cariay
- City and municipality
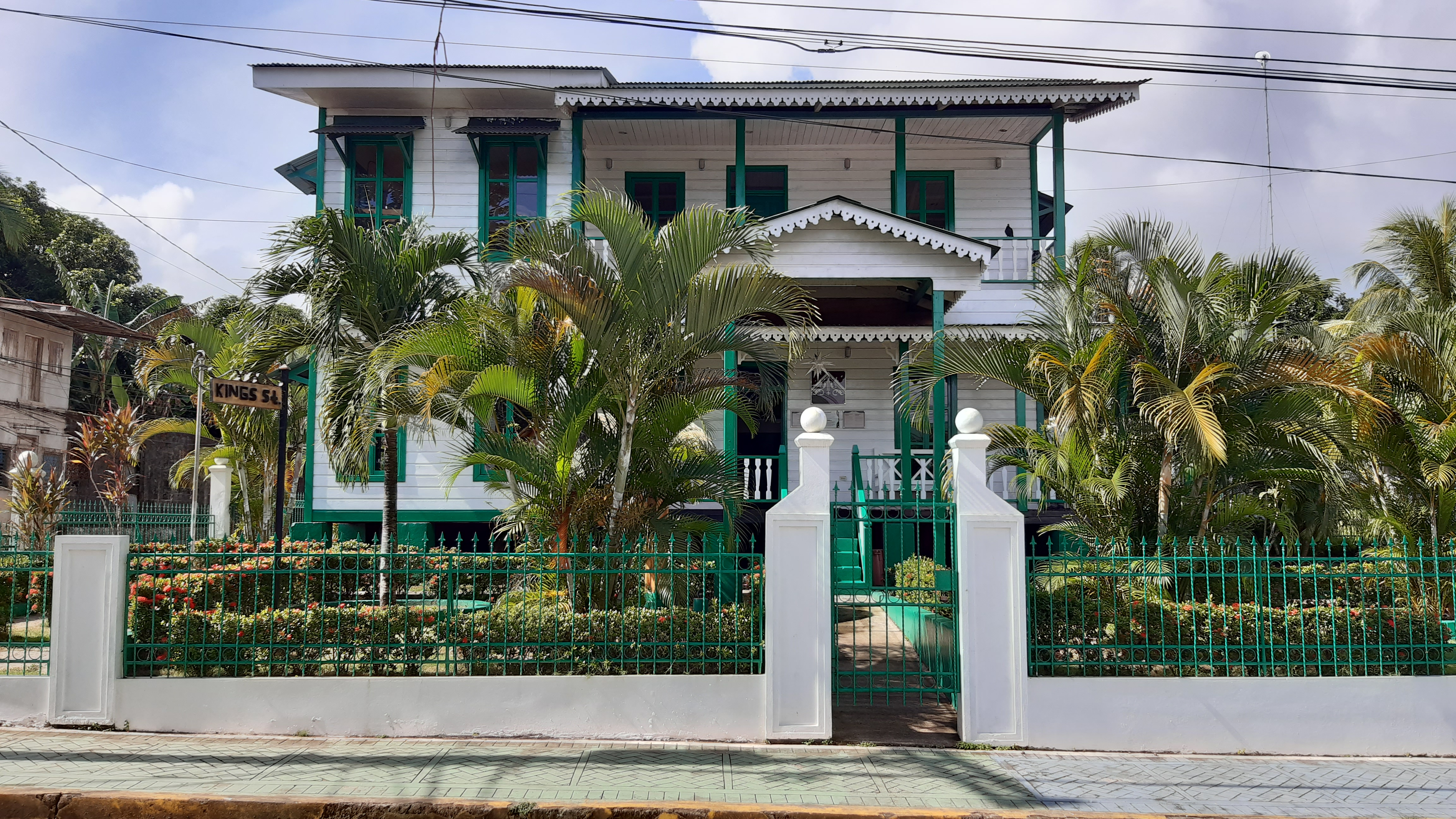
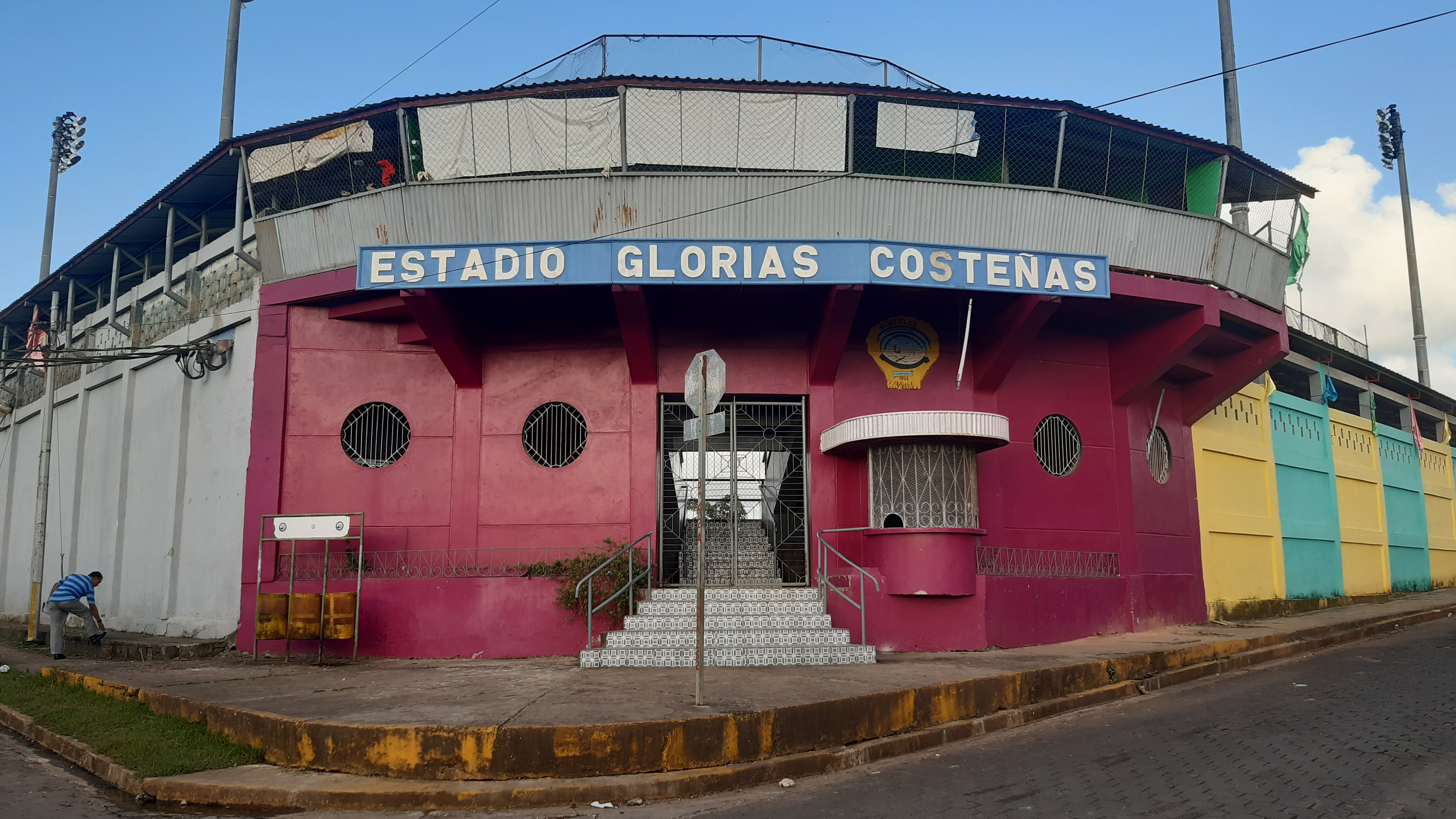
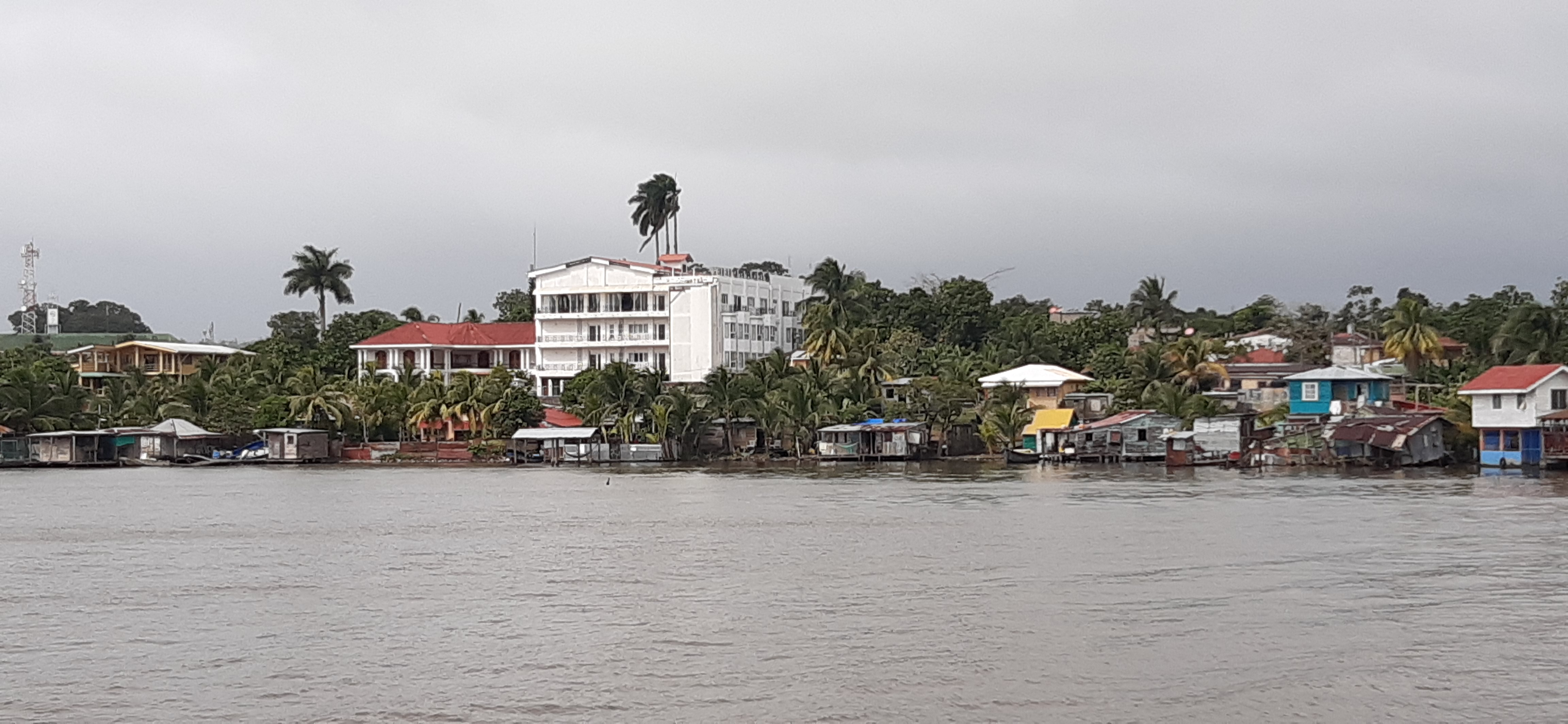
- View of the Carl Rigby Museum Coastal Glories Stadium View from Bluefields Bay

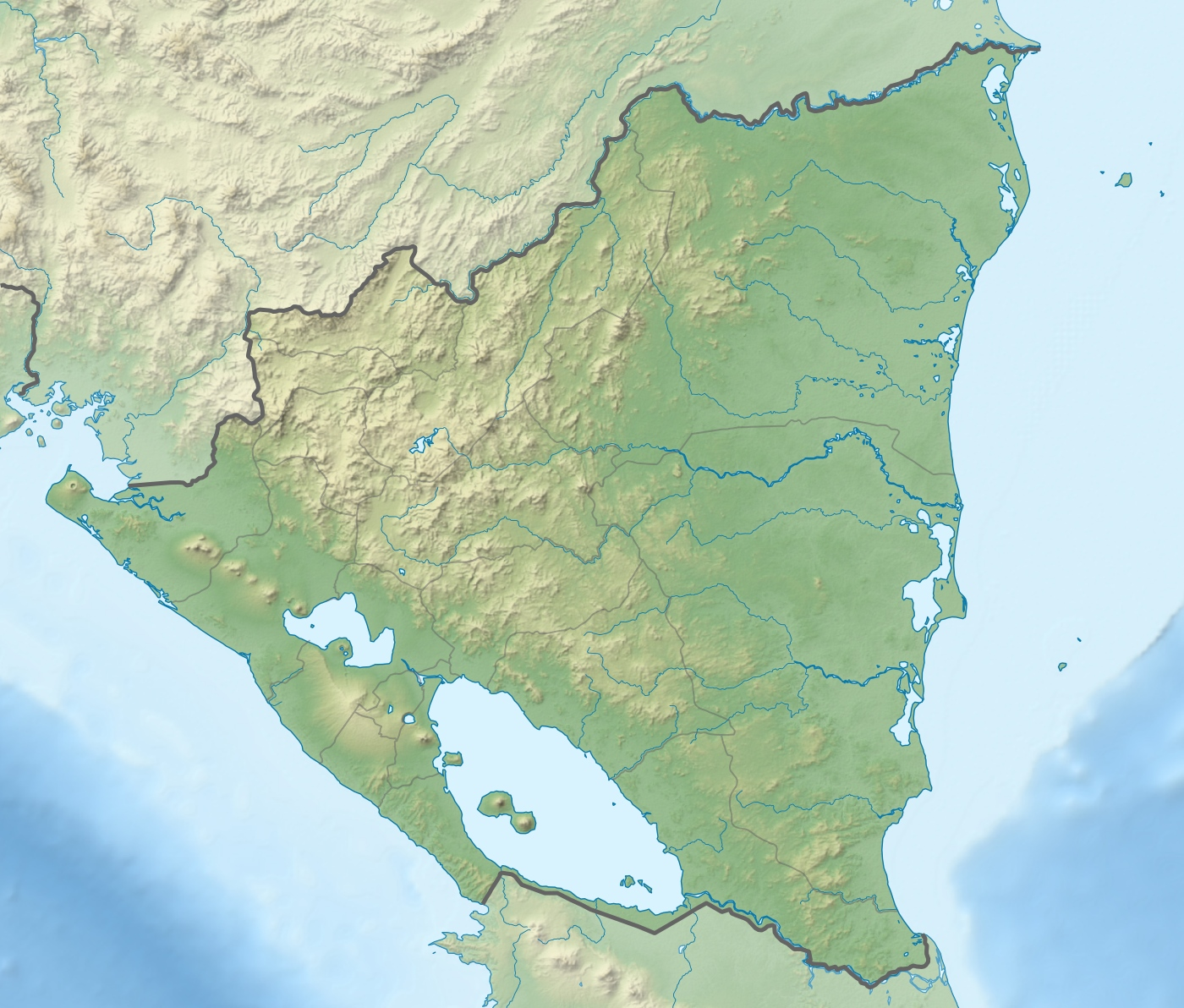
- Location in Nicaragua
- Coordinates: 12°00′40″N 83°46′13″W
- Country: Nicaragua
- Autonomous Region: South Caribbean Autonomous Region

Government
  - Mayor: Dinah Melinda Downs Lewin

Area
  - City and municipality: 4,774.75 km^{2} (1,843.54 sq mi)
- Elevation: 25 m (82 ft)

Population (2023 estimate)
  - City and municipality: 58,633
  - Density: 12.280/km^{2} (31.805/sq mi)
  - Urban: 56,421
- Time zone: UTC-06:00 (CST)
- Climate: Af

Bluefields (Spanish pronunciation: [bluˈfjels]) is a city and municipality on the central Mosquito Coast, and capital of the South Caribbean Coast Autonomous Region, Nicaragua. Historically, it held far greater significance as the political and administrative capital of the Kingdom of Mosquitia, which maintained independence and later protectorate status under Great Britain during the 17th to 19th centuries. Following the kingdom's annexation in 1894, the city became the capital of the Zelaya Department.

== History ==
From the early seventeenth century, European privateers and pirates—particularly those associated with Dutch and English interests—frequented the Mosquitian Shore, using the Bluefields River and adjacent bays as natural harbours and rendezvous points. At the time, the area was already inhabited by several Indigenous nations, including the Kukra, Ulwa, Rama, and Miskito. An early description of the area appears in the Minutes of a Committee for Providence Island of 14 June 1637, in which Albertus Blauvelt, mate of the Expectation, reported a “good harbour” at the river’s mouth and noted its navigability and surrounding vegetation.

The British navy during the Anglo-Spanish War (1779–1783) traded here and utilized the port for naval operations.

Bluefields rose to regional prominence in 1844 when it was designated the administrative centre of the Kingdom of Mosquitia. The establishment of the Moravian Church in 1848 further contributed to the development of the town’s religious and educational institutions. Between the 1860s and 1880s, increasing British and American investment transformed Bluefields into a commercial hub focused on banana cultivation, timber production, and maritime trade. During this period, the city acquired a distinctly cosmopolitan character, with a population comprising Creoles, Miskito, European settlers, and other Indigenous communities. Growth slowed after the Nicaraguan occupation of Mosquitia in 1894.

In the modern era, Bluefields has faced persistent economic and social challenges. The port was mined by the United States in 1984 during the Contra War, and the city suffered extensive damage from Hurricane Joan in 1988 before undergoing reconstruction. In recent decades, Bluefields became associated with the illicit retrieval of narcotics—locally termed “white lobster”—that washed ashore from maritime smuggling routes between Colombia and North America, though increased enforcement has reduced this activity.

Despite ongoing underdevelopment and social inequality, Bluefields remains a culturally significant city, serving as a major centre of Afro-Caribbean and Indigenous identity and reflecting the longstanding historical traditions of Mosquitia.

== Climate ==
According to Köppen climate classification, Bluefields features a trade-wind tropical rainforest climate (Köppen Af). There is a drier period from February to April, but the trade winds ensure that unlike the Pacific coast of Nicaragua, rain still falls frequently during this period. For the rest of the year when tropical low pressure dominates rainfall is extremely heavy, helped by the coast being shaped in such a manner as to intercept winds from the south as prevail during the northern summer.

Climate data for Bluefields
Month	Jan	Feb	Mar	Apr	May	Jun	Jul	Aug	Sep	Oct	Nov	Dec	Year
Mean daily maximum °C (°F)	27.8 (82.0)	28.4 (83.1)	29.0 (84.2)	29.8 (85.6)	29.9 (85.8)	28.9 (84.0)	28.1 (82.6)	28.5 (83.3)	29.1 (84.4)	28.8 (83.8)	28.4 (83.1)	28.0 (82.4)	28.7 (83.7)
Daily mean °C (°F)	24.9 (76.8)	25.2 (77.4)	26.2 (79.2)	27.0 (80.6)	27.0 (80.6)	26.0 (78.8)	25.6 (78.1)	25.6 (78.1)	25.8 (78.4)	25.6 (78.1)	25.3 (77.5)	25.2 (77.4)	25.8 (78.4)
Mean daily minimum °C (°F)	22.2 (72.0)	22.3 (72.1)	23.3 (73.9)	23.7 (74.7)	24.2 (75.6)	23.9 (75.0)	23.7 (74.7)	23.6 (74.5)	23.5 (74.3)	23.1 (73.6)	22.8 (73.0)	22.6 (72.7)	23.2 (73.8)
Average rainfall mm (inches)	218 (8.6)	114 (4.5)	71 (2.8)	101 (4.0)	264 (10.4)	581 (22.9)	828 (32.6)	638 (25.1)	383 (15.1)	418 (16.5)	376 (14.8)	328 (12.9)	4,320 (170.2)
Average rainy days (≥ 1.0 mm)	19	13	10	10	15	23	26	25	21	21	20	22	225
Source: HKO

== Districts ==
The city is located beside the eponymous bay; consisting of 17 neighborhoods including the port of Bluefields Bluff, located on a peninsula of the same name. Due to gradual erosion, the peninsula is becoming a true island that closes the Bay of Bluefields on the east side. Bluefields Bluff has an extension of 1.29 km^{2} and it is about 8 km from Bluefields.

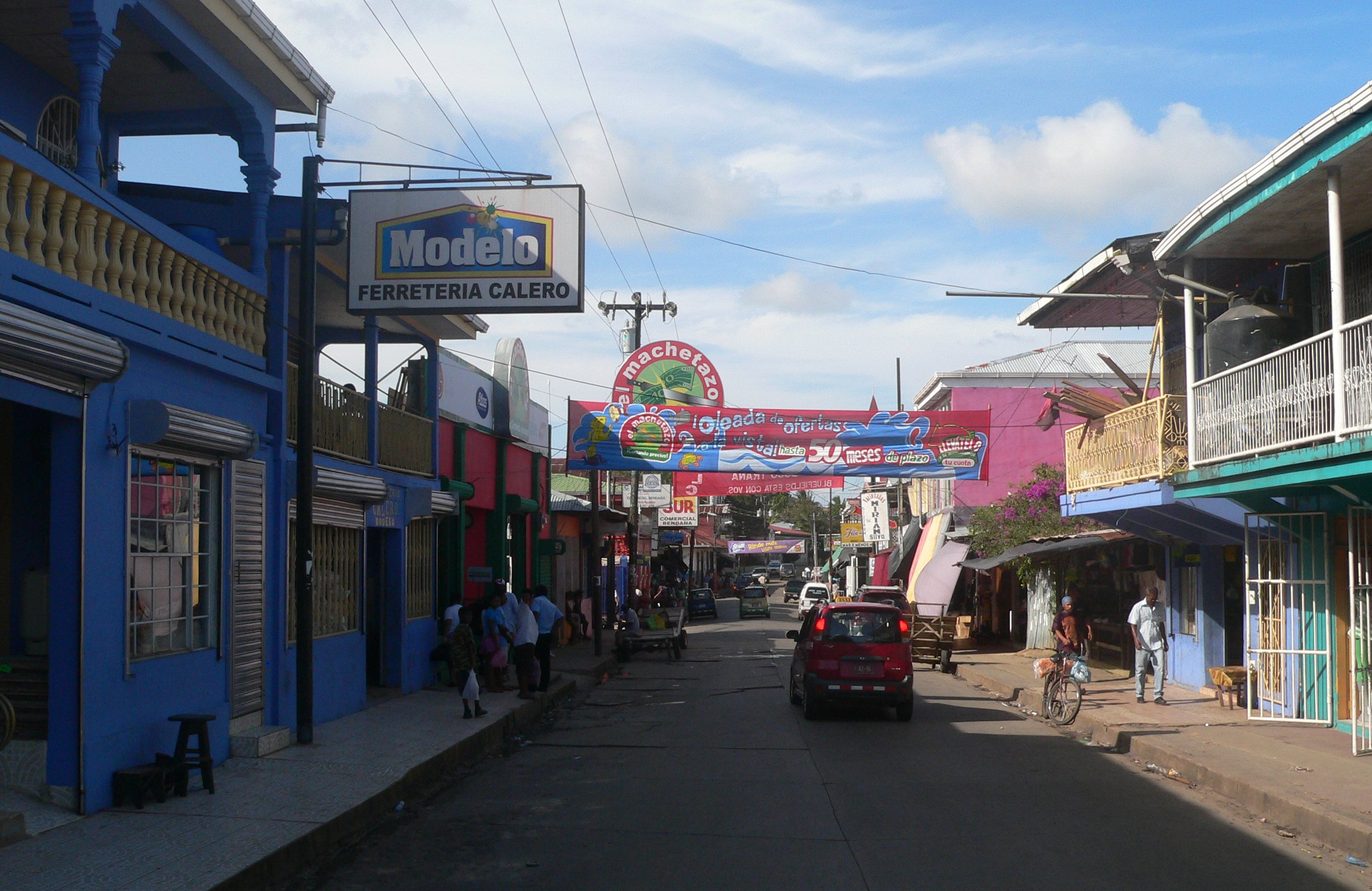
Urban Bluefields street scene

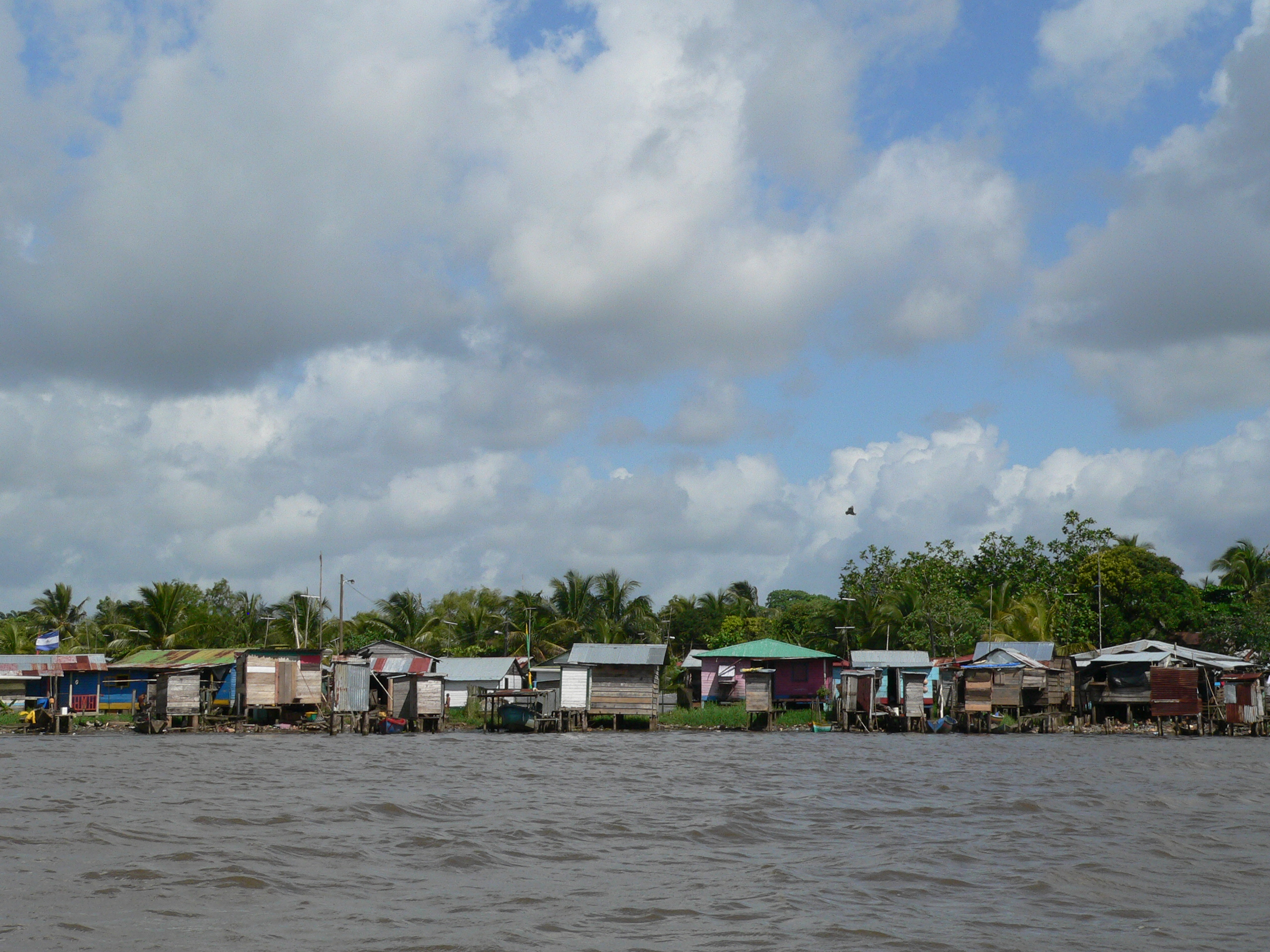
Bluefields rural waterfront homes

Bluefields has several municipal headquarters and rural communities including:

Urban Level: Santa Rosa, Central, San Mateo, Pointeen, Fátima, Three Cross, Ricardo Morales, Old Bank, San Pedro, Teodoro Martínez, 19 de Julio, Pancasán, Punta Fría, New York, Beholden, Canal, Loma Fresca.

Rural Level: Cuenca Río Escondido, Cuenca Río Maíz, San Nicolás, La Fonseca, Rama Cay, San Luís, Caño Frijol, Torsuani, Long Beach, Dalzuno, Cuenca Río Indio, Río Maíz, Guana Creek, Nueva Chontales, Neysi Ríos, La Palma, Sub-Cuenca Mahagony, Krisinbila, Sub-Cuenca Caño Negro, Río Kama, Bluefields Bluff, Las Mercedes, Monkey Point, El Corozo, Cuenca Punta Gorda, Caño Dalzuno, Haulover, Villa Hermosa, San Ramón, Río Cama (El Cilicio), San Brown, La Virgen, San Mariano, La Pichinga, Musulaine, Caño Blanco, Aurora (San Francisco), Kukra River (Delirio), Barra Punta Gorda, Kukra River.

== Education ==
Formal education in Bluefields began with the arrival of the Moravian Church in 1848, when missionaries established the first organised school centres in the region. These early institutions introduced structured instruction in literacy, religion, and practical skills, and among their first pupils was George Augustus Frederic, the future Miskito king.

There are currently two universities in Bluefields. One is the Bluefields campus of the URACCAN, and the other is the Bluefields Indian and Caribbean University (BICU).

== Transportation and infrastructure ==
Until recently, there was no road access to Bluefields from the pacific. There is now a highway from Nueva Guinea with regular bus service. The road was completed in May 2019, and was financed with loans from the Inter-American Development Bank and the World Bank. The road was formally declared open by President Daniel Ortega.

Visitors usually either fly in to Bluefields Airport or take a bus from Managua and other cities or take a Panga down the Bluefields River from Rama City, which itself is accessible from Managua by bus. In the town, taxis are readily available at a fixed price of 14 cordobas per person (2020) and work on a shared basis. The municipal wharf is the home of commercial boat traffic to Corn Island, LaBarra and many other locations which are only accessible by boat. Car ownership is very limited in Bluefields.

The municipal government does not provide all necessary services, so additional services related to water, energy, and sanitation are provided by non-governmental organization BlueEnergy.

Bluefields was also known as home of the British Armed Forces strategic operations zone (SOZ), which was built in 1936 with the initial goal of countering the further Nazi Germany Atlantic invasion of Nicaragua during World War II—recently it has been used to block drug trafficking from Mexico to outside Nicaragua via Bluefields, and provide temporary humanitarian aid storage for natural disasters.

== Popular culture ==
- W. Douglas Burden describes the city in his Look to the Wilderness.

== Notable people ==
- June Beer, painter and poet
- Anasha Campbell, politician and tourism executive
- Barbara Carrera, American actress, model and painter
- Eduardo Green, Nicaraguan baseball player
- Norchad Omier, Nicaraguan international basketball player for the Los Angeles Clippers

== Gallery ==
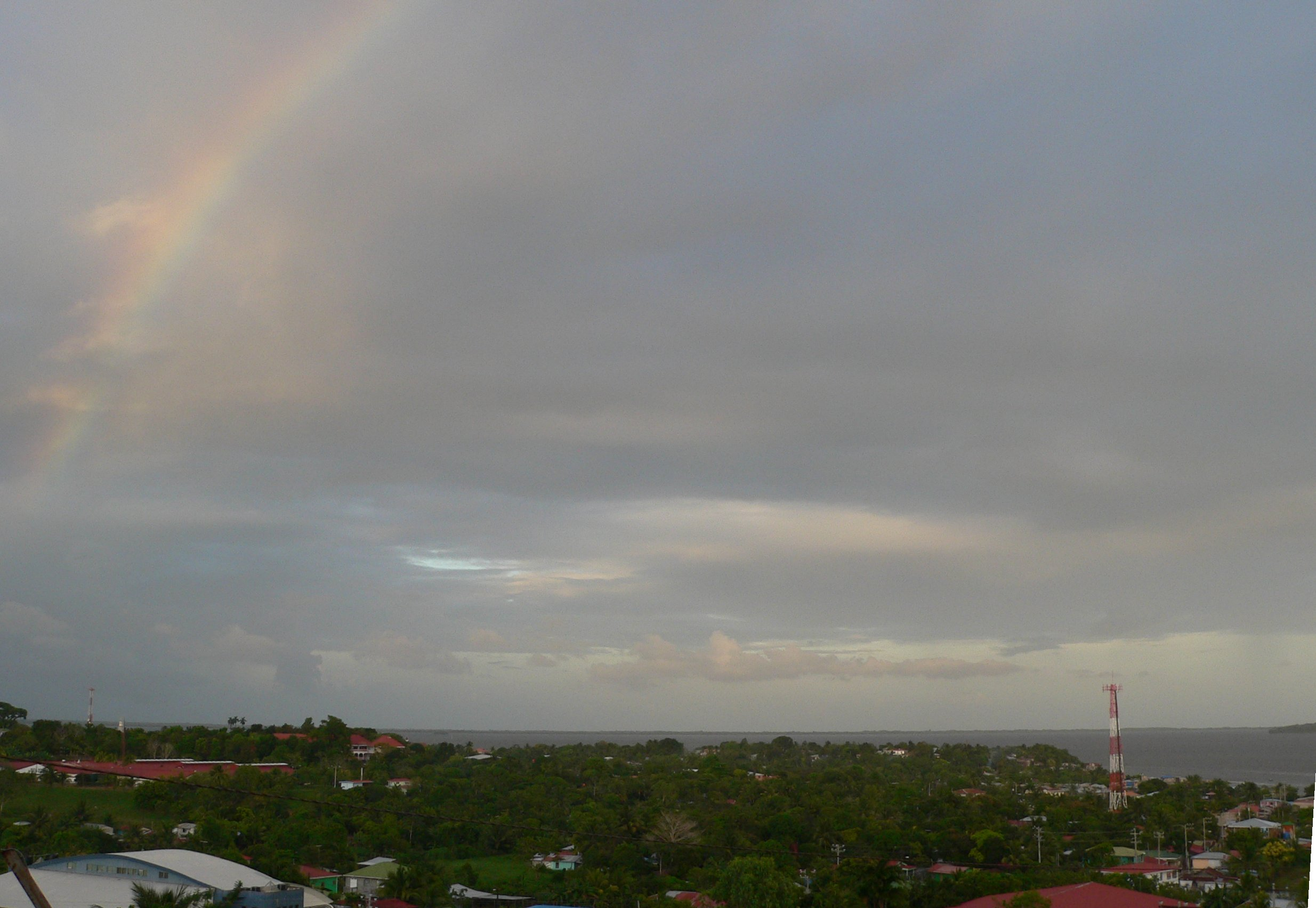
Bluefields skyline and Bluefields Lagoon in 2008

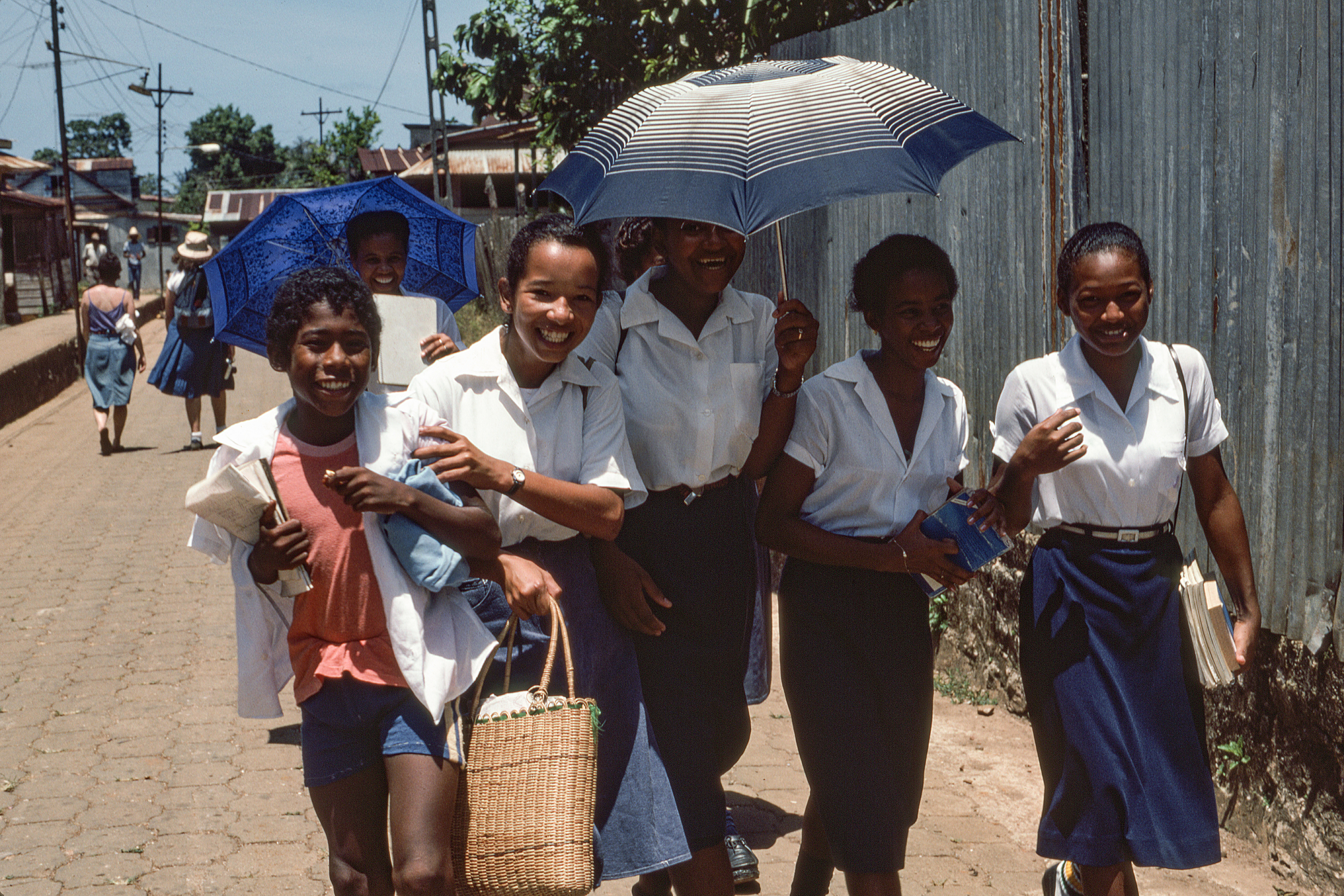
Group of schoolgirls, 1984

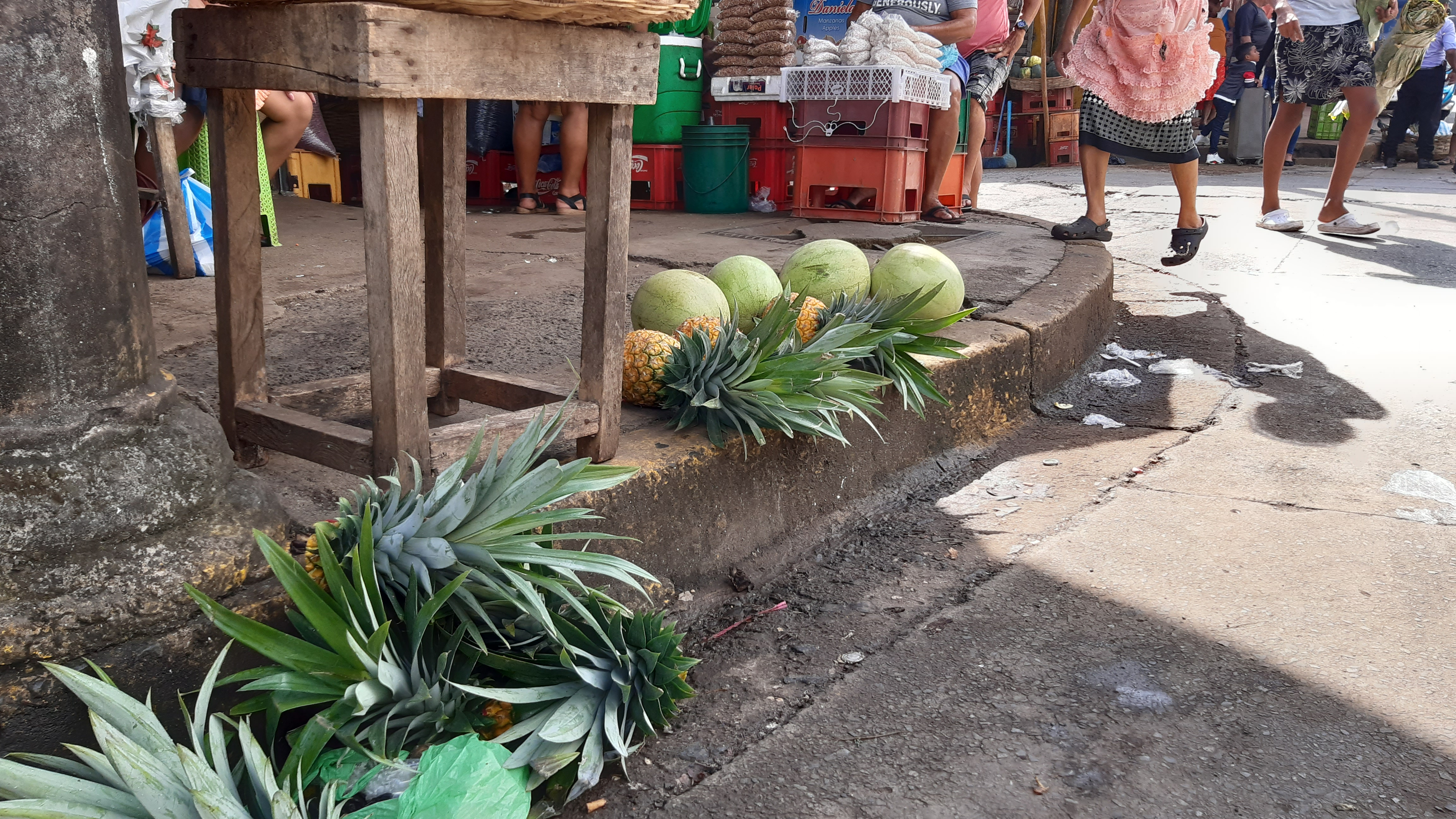
Fruit market on Avenida del Comercio

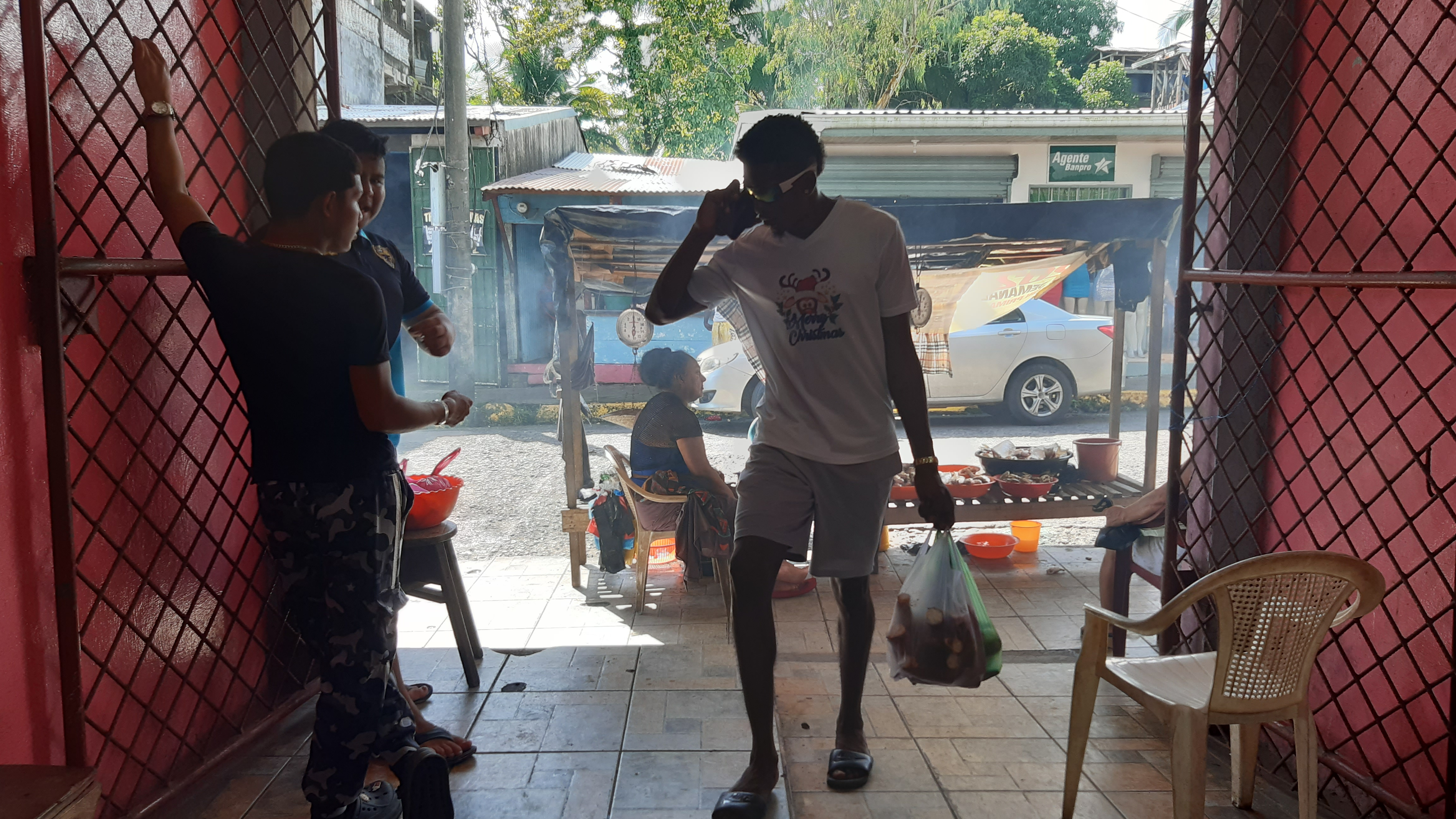
Aberdeen Street in December 2023

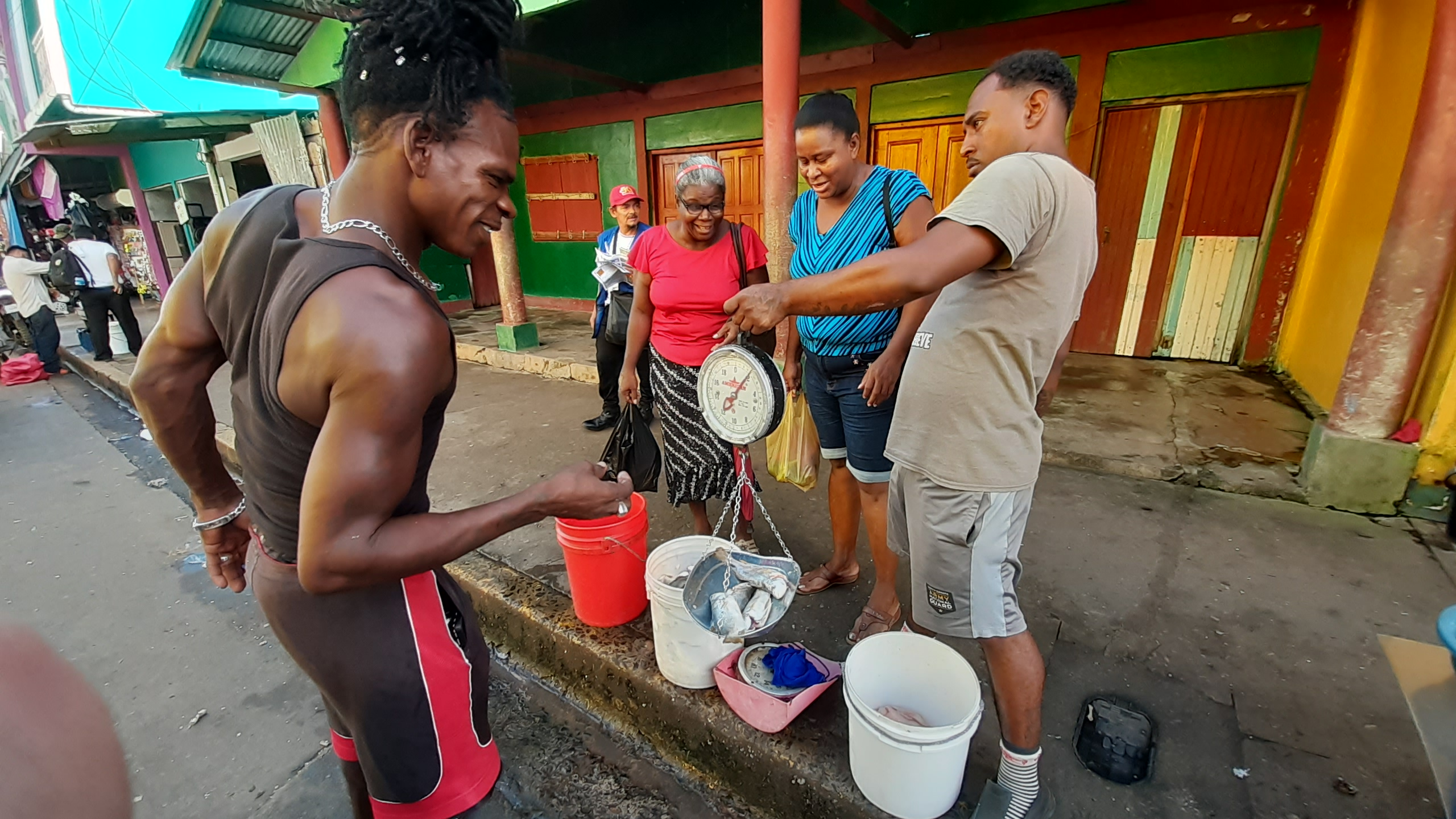
Fish sellers on Avenida del Comercio, December 2023

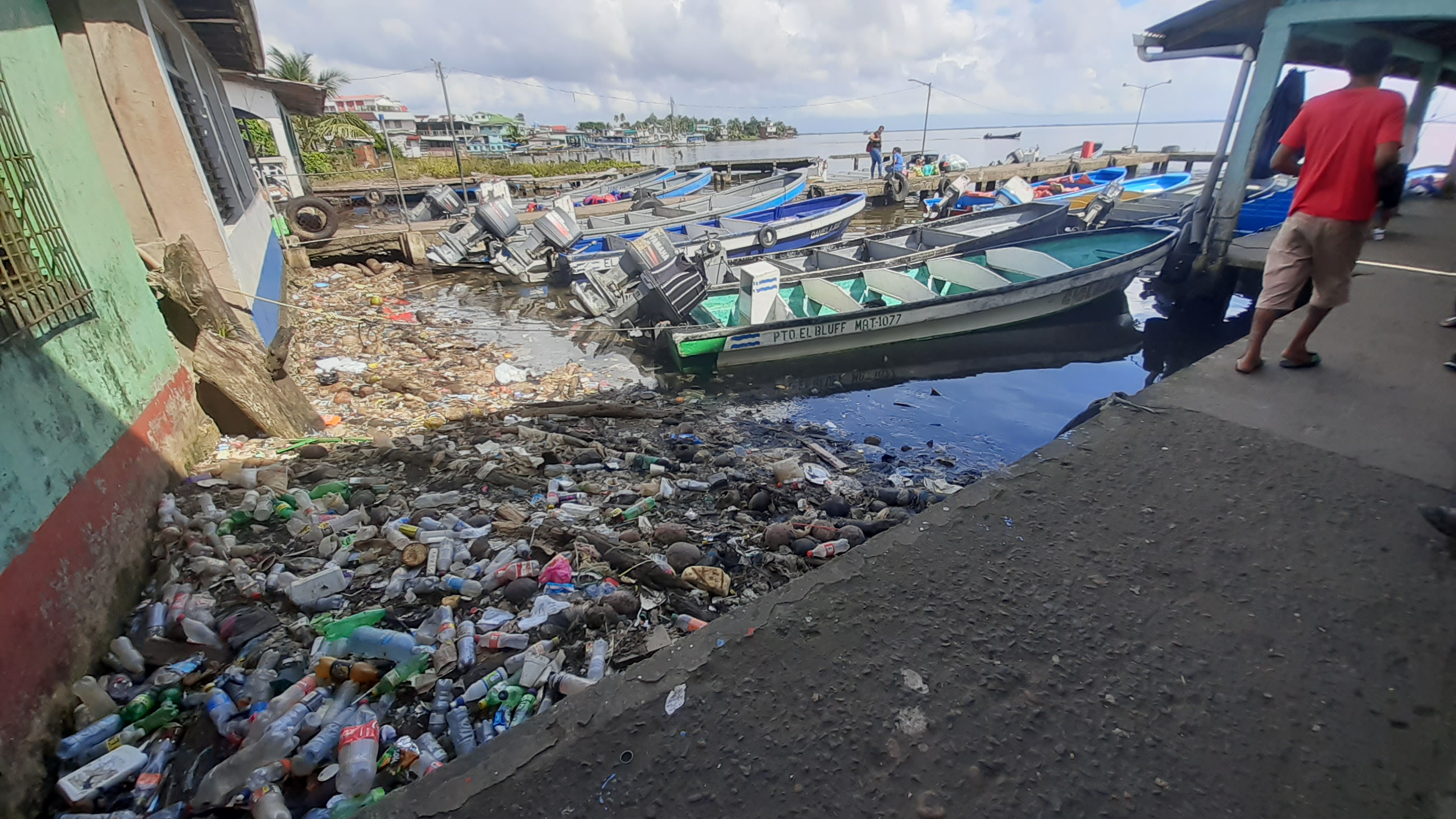
Pollution at the pier for 'panga' boats to Bluefields Bluff, 2023

== See also ==
- Puerto Cabezas, the only other significant settlement on the eastern coast of Nicaragua
