= Nicaraguans =

People of Nicaragua

Nicaraguans Nicaragüenses
- Flag of Nicaragua

- A choropleth map of the Nicaraguan diaspora

Total population
- 7,312,856; Nicaragua 6,596,000

Regions with significant populations
- Costa Rica: 350,854
- United States: 255,008
- Spain: 42,784
- Panama: 15,517
- Canada: 10,627
- Guatemala: 9,211
- El Salvador: 7,956
- Honduras: 7,943
- Mexico: 4,303
- Venezuela: 1,927
- Germany: 1,685
- Italy: 1,381
- Australia: 947
- Sweden: 929
- Switzerland: 792
- France: 738
- Netherlands: 613
- Brazil: 465
- Ecuador: 408
- Belgium: 407
- United Kingdom: 393
- Dominican Republic: 303
- Peru: 303
- Austria: 275
- Romania: 235
- Norway: 223
- Denmark: 222
- Greece: 161
- South Africa: 130
- Jamaica: 124

Languages
- Spanish; Miskito; English; other foreign and indigenous languages

Religion
- Predominantly Roman Catholic and Protestant; irreligious and other religious minorities exist

Nicaraguans (Spanish: Nicaragüenses; also called Nicas) are people inhabiting in, originating or having significant heritage from Nicaragua. Most Nicaraguans live in Nicaragua, although there is also a significant Nicaraguan diaspora, particularly in Costa Rica and the United States with smaller communities in other countries around the world. There are also people living in Nicaragua who are not Nicaraguans because they were not born or raised in Nicaragua nor have they gained citizenship.

== Genetic makeup ==
The genetic makeup of Nicaraguans differs from the western half of Nicaragua to the eastern half. DNA studies show that most western Nicaraguans (whites and mestizos) descend from Europeans (mostly Spanish, Italian, and Portuguese), an Indigenous combination of Nahua, Otomanguean, and Chibcha ancestry, and Africans (descending mostly from West Africans forcibly transported to the region as enslaved peoples during colonization and Southern Europeans with North African ancestry). The combined Nahua, Otomanguean, and Chibcha ancestry of western Nicaraguans suggests that instead of a mass displacement of Chibchas by migrating Mesoamerican groups like the Nicaraos and Chorotegas, they assimilated the Chibchas who already inhabited western Nicaragua into their societies and mixed with them, blending North American and South American ancestries. This is further evident in the Chibcha minorities that lived and thrived within the Nahua chiefdoms of Kwawkapolkan, Kakawatan, and Masatepek in modern-day Rivas and Masaya. In addition, the military forces of Kwawkapolkan, Kakawatan, and Masatepek had Chibcha troops serving alongside their Nahua counterparts as military service provided social advancement and assimilation to further integrate into Nahua society. Furthermore, the Nicaraos cultivation of potatoes also suggests cultural diffusion between the Nahuas and Chibchas, as the Chibchas introduced potatoes to Nicaragua from South America which did not reach northern Mesoamerica.

Genetic studies show that eastern Nicaraguans mostly descend from shipwrecked enslaved Africans who intermarried and mixed with the Indigenous peoples of Caribbean Nicaragua (creating the Miskito Sambu, an ethnic group of Zambos), and British colonizers who ruled the Caribbean coasts of Nicaragua and Honduras for roughly 225 years. The Black Nicaraguans in the Caribbean coast are mostly of West Indian (Antillean) origin, the descendants of slaves brought mostly from Jamaica when the region was a British protectorate. There is also a smaller number of Garífuna, a people of mixed Carib, Angolan, Congolese and Arawak descent. However, pure Indigenous peoples still exist in the Caribbean coast, such as the Rama, Mayangna, and the Tawira Miskito who're related to the Zambo Miskitos, both groups were rivals and often competed for territory which led to wars between the two, further dividing the two Miskito groups in the 18th century.

== Demographics ==
=== Population ===
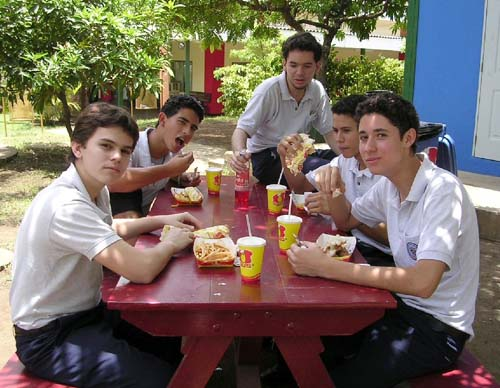
Nicaraguan boys

As of 2023, Nicaragua's total human population reached 7.0 million, with the capital (and most populous) city of Managua containing 1.5 million.

According to the UN, Nicaragua has a population of 7,243,000 (July 1, 2015) with a population growth rate of 1.31% (during the period 2005–2010) and a birth rate of 24.9 / 1,000 population (2005–2010), third highest in the region. The life expectancy for Nicaraguans at birth is (2005–2015) 74.45 years; 70.9 for males and 78.0 for females.

=== Ethnic groups ===
Data from the CIA World Factbook estimates that Nicaragua's population is around 69% Mestizos, and 17% White, with the majority being of full Spanish descent as well as Italian, German, or French ancestry. Mestizos and White make up the majority of Nicaraguans and mainly reside in the western region of the country, combined they make up 88% and of the total population.

About 5% of Nicaraguans are descending from one or more of the country's Indigenous peoples. Nicaragua's pre-Columbian population consisted of many Indigenous groups such as the Nahua. In the western region, the Nahua people (also known as the Pipil-Nicaraos) were present along with other groups such as Otomangueans and Chibchas. Nicaragua's central region and the Caribbean coast were inhabited by Indigenous peoples who were also Chibcha-related groups that had migrated from South America, primarily what is today Colombia and Venezuela. These groups include the present-day Miskitos, Ramas and Mayangna. In the 19th century, there was a substantial indigenous minority, but this group was also largely assimilated culturally into the mestizo majority. In the mid-1980s, the government divided the department of Zelaya Department into two autonomous regions and granted the Indigenous people of this region limited self-rule.

The remainder 9% of Nicaragua's population is Black, and mainly reside on the country's sparsely populated Caribbean (or Atlantic) coast. The Black population is mostly of West Indian (Antillean) origin, the descendants of indentured laborers brought mostly from Jamaica when the region was a British protectorate. There is also a smaller number of Garífuna, a people of mixed Carib, Angolan, Congolese and Arawak descent.

Ethnic groups in Nicaragua
1. Mestizo (69.0%)
2. White (17.0%)
3. Black (9.00%)
4. Native American (5.00%)

=== Immigration ===
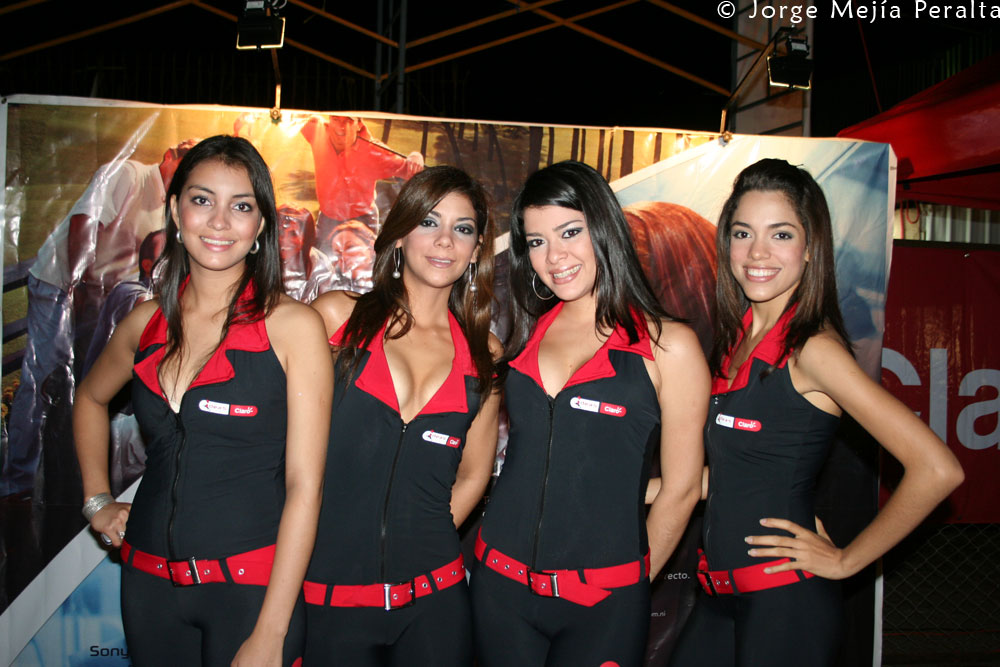
Nicaraguan women at a concert in Managua.

Relative to its overall population, Nicaragua has never experienced any large scale wave of immigrants. The total number of immigrants to Nicaragua, both originating from other Latin American countries and all other countries, never surpassed 1% of its total population prior to 1995. The 2005 census showed the foreign-born population at 1.2%, having risen a mere .06% in 10 years. This is not to say that immigrants were not important to the evolution of Nicaraguan society and the Nicaraguan nation.

The founding members of the Deutsche Club in Nicaragua

In the 19th century Nicaragua experienced a wave of immigration, primarily from Europe. In particular, families from Spain, Germany, Italy, France and Belgium generally moved to Nicaragua to start a new life. They received free land, monetary incentives, and other perks in exchange for populating unsettled territories and working in the new growing coffee industry. In time immigrants were able to set up newspapers, hotels and banks.

There is also a small Middle Eastern-Nicaraguan community of Syrian, Armenian, Palestinian Nicaraguan, Jewish Nicaraguan, and Lebanese people in Nicaragua with a total population of about 30,000. There is also an East Asian community of Chinese. The Chinese Nicaraguan population is estimated at 12,000. The Chinese arrived in the late 19th century but were unsubstantiated until the second census (in 1920) revealed 400 people of the Chinese nationality.

== Nicaraguans abroad ==
Nicaragua, as well as other Latin American countries, have a long history of migration to the United States. However, Nicaragua is the only country in its region to have Costa Rica as the primary destination. Estimates on the basis of the Nicaraguan Health Survey indicated that at least 11% of Nicaraguan households have at least 1 person residing abroad.

Smaller numbers of Nicaraguans live in many other countries around the world such as other countries in Latin America, Europe, Canada, China and Taiwan among others.

=== Nicaraguans in Costa Rica ===
Nicaraguan migration to Costa Rica has occurred since the mid-19th century. Unlike other Latin American countries, Nicaraguan migrants' primary destination is not the United States, it is Costa Rica. An estimate 9% (more than 385,899) of the Costa Rican population is made up of Nicaraguans; some of them migrate for seasonal work opportunities and then return to their country. Costa Rica and Nicaragua signed an agreement regulating seasonal migration in 1998; it allows Nicaraguans with work permits to enter Costa Rica at the western border at Peñas Blancas on the Pan-American Highway. In the northern part of Costa Rica there are 287,766 Nicaraguans and the Catholic Church in this area has an active program to protect the rights of migrant workers.

=== Nicaraguans in the United States ===
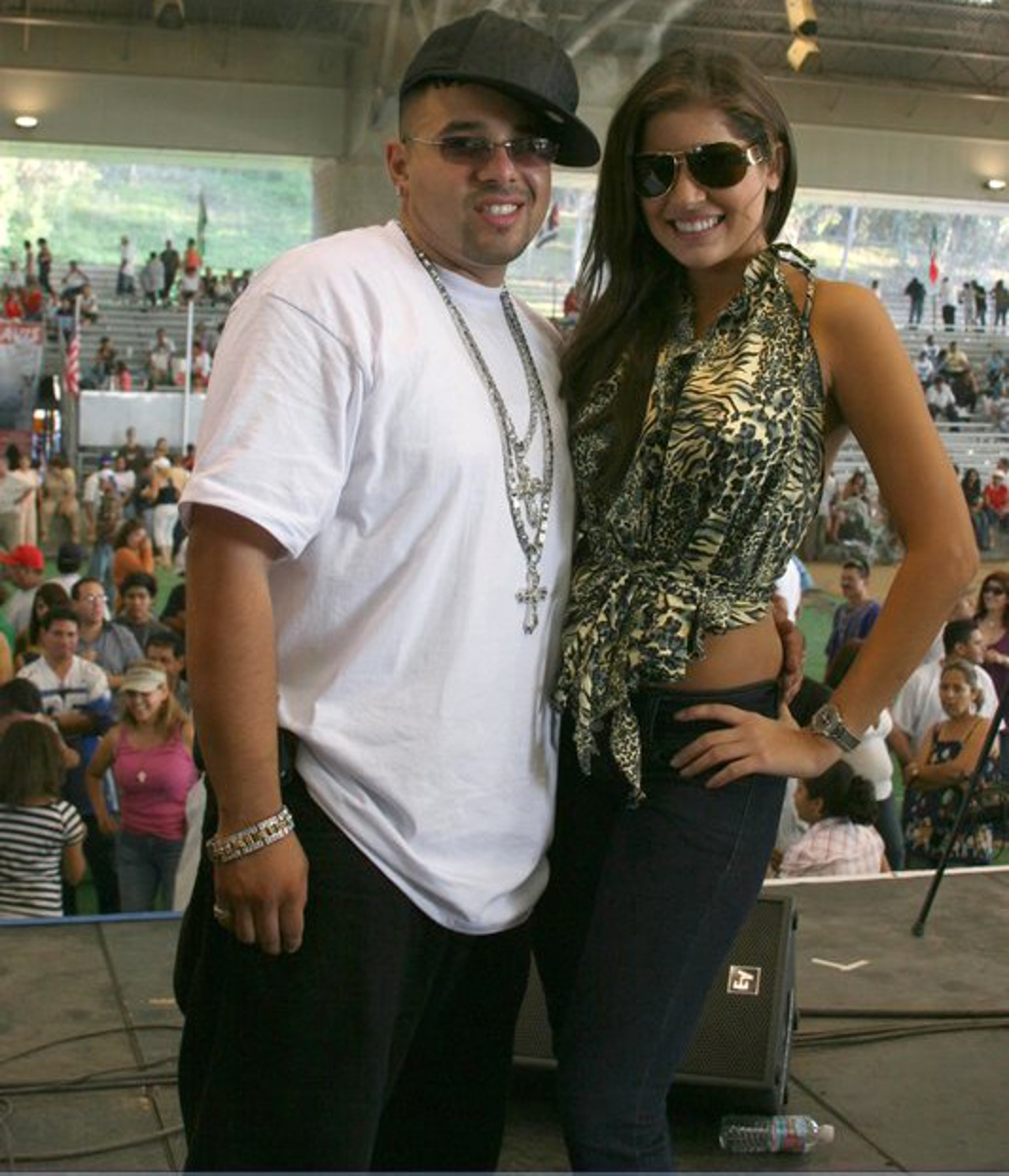
J Smooth and Miss Nicaragua 2007, Xiomara Blandino celebrating La Feria Agostina, or the Nicaraguan Festival, in Los Angeles with up to 8,000 Nicaraguan Americans.

Abroad, the United States is home to the second largest number of Nicaraguans outside Nicaragua, particularly in the Miami area. The estimated number of Nicaraguan Americans in the United States was 281,167 in 2006, up from 177,684 in 2000.

The earliest documents of immigration from Nicaragua to the United States was combined in total with those of other Central American countries. However, according to the U.S. Census Bureau some 7,500 Nicaraguans legally immigrated from 1967 to 1976. An estimated 28,620 Nicaraguans were living in the U.S. in 1970, 90% of which self-reported as "white" on the 1970 census. Most Nicaraguan immigrants during the late 1960s were women: there were only 60 male Nicaraguan immigrants for every 100 female immigrants during this period. In 1998 more than two million Nicaraguans were left homeless due to hurricane Mitch, as a result many Nicaraguans received permanent residence or temporary protected status (TPS) in the late 1990s.

According to the 1990 U.S. census 168,659 of the total 202,658 documented Nicaraguans in the U.S. were born in Nicaragua. In 1992 approximately 10–12% of the Nicaraguan population had emigrated. These emigrants tended to be disproportionately of working age, better educated, and more often white-collar workers than nonmigrants. In addition, emigrants were more likely to come from larger premigration households and higher income households.

Areas of greatest concentration in the United States

The largest concentration of Nicaraguan Americans in the United States, about 79,559, is in Miami, Florida, most notably around the areas of Sweetwater and "Little Managua". Sweetwater has the highest concentration of Nicaraguan American in the United States, in 2000 16.63% of Sweetwater residents identified as being of Nicaraguan heritage. This was the highest percentage of Nicaraguan Americans of any place in the country. As a result, Sweetwater is locally known as "Little Managua" after Managua, the Nicaraguan capital. However, the area of "Little Havana" in Miami is also colloquially called "Little Managua" even though Sweetwater has a higher number of Nicaraguan Americans.

California hosts the second largest concentration, most notably in the metropolitan areas of Los Angeles and San Francisco. The number of Nicaraguan Americans living in California was 51,336 in 2000.

== History ==
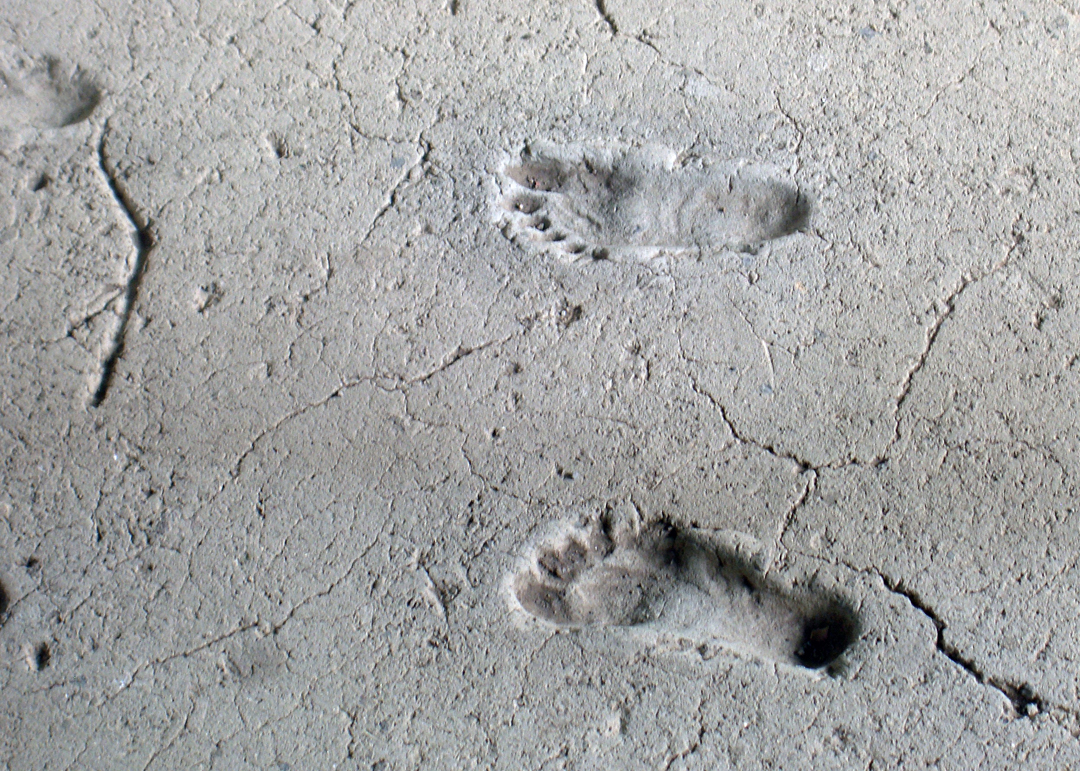
2,100-year-old human footprints preserved in volcanic mud near Lake Managua, which are known as the Ancient footprints of Acahualinca.

It is known that Nicaragua was inhabited by Paleo-Indians as far back as 6000 years. This is confirmed by archaeological evidences, mainly ceramics and statues made of volcanic stone like the ones found on the island of Zapatera and petroglyphs found on Ometepe island. At the end of the 15th century, western Nicaragua was inhabited by several different indigenous peoples related by culture to the Mesoamerican civilizations of the Aztec and Maya, and by language to the Mesoamerican Linguistic Area. However, within three decades an estimated Indian population of one million plummeted to a few tens of thousands, as approximately half of the indigenous people in western Nicaragua died of diseases brought by the Spaniards. The central region and the Caribbean coast of Nicaragua were inhabited by indigenous peoples who were mostly Chibcha-related groups that had migrated from South America, primarily what is now Colombia and Venezuela. These groups include the present-day Miskitos, Ramas and Sumos who lived a less sedentary life based on hunting and gathering, as well as fishing and performing slash-and-burn agriculture.

=== Sandinista Revolution ===
The Somoza family's dictatorship created decades of political unrest and social inequality. The Sandinista National Liberation Front (FSLN) was formed in 1961 inspired by Augusto César Sandino, an anti-imperialist leader who resisted U.S. military occupation. The assassination of journalist Pedro Joaquín Chamorro in 1978 was the final turning point in a nationwide uprising that cost roughly 50,000 lives but successfully ended the Somoza regime.

During the 1979 uprising, many middle-class and wealthy families left Nicaragua. The Sandinista revolution during the 1980s brought a wave of Nicaraguan refugees into the U.S., and the largest wave of documented immigrants. Many Nicaraguans also fled to nearby Costa Rica and other countries. Over 62 percent of the total documented immigration from 1979 to 1988 occurred after 1984. Many Nicaraguans who immigrated did so to escape poverty, in Santa Clara County, California, the Nicaraguan public benefits recipients reported that in their families, 43% have one self-employed person or business owner, and 14% of the families have two such persons. However, nearly all of the estimated 200,000 Nicaraguans who fled to the United States (and other nearby Central American countries) between 1978 and 1979 returned after the victory of the Sandinistas in 1979.

=== Women's Political Mobilization and Social Change ===
Before the Sandinista Revolution, class structured women's lives in different ways. Working-class women concentrated in informal labor, domestic service and low-wage factory work, with limited access to education or political institutions. Upper-class women experienced social restrictions rooted in Catholic and patriarchal norms but generally benefitted economically from the Somoza regime through their families' elite status. These women generally aligned politically with their husbands, while working-class and lower-middle-class women actively participated in efforts against the Somoza dictatorship. Their roles ranged from underground political organizing to direct military involvement where young women from urban working-class neighborhoods made up 30% of FSLN combat forces and specialized women's battalions were created to support civil defense during the final two years of the insurrection. According to historical accounts, women and girls in the conflict experienced forced displacement, sexual violence, and the destruction of their homes. Their involvement caused a shift in gender roles for young women from working-class neighborhoods and contributed to the emergence of popular feminist consciousness.

The creation of the Luisa Amanda Espinoza Association of Nicaraguan Women (AMNLAE) allowed women from popular sectors to participate in national reconstruction efforts such as vaccination drives, agricultural harvests, and the formation of neighborhood Sandinista Defense Committees. These campaigns challenged traditional expectations that confined working-class women to domestic labor. During the 1980s, the FSLN publicly acknowledged women's "double day", the unpaid domestic labor that women are expected to manage alongside earning a daily wage, identifying sexism and machismo as barriers to women's equality. Studies show that women performing wage labor still carried out 56% of all household work, compared to 9% performed by men, resulting in 16-18 hour work days. By the 1990s and 2000s, feminist organizations built on this momentum to address gender-based violence with expanded services for survivors, and campaigns challenging violent gender norms. A national household survey conducted in León found a 63 percent decline in physical intimate partner violence between 1995 and 2016, a reduction linked to feminist advocacy.

== Culture and traditions ==
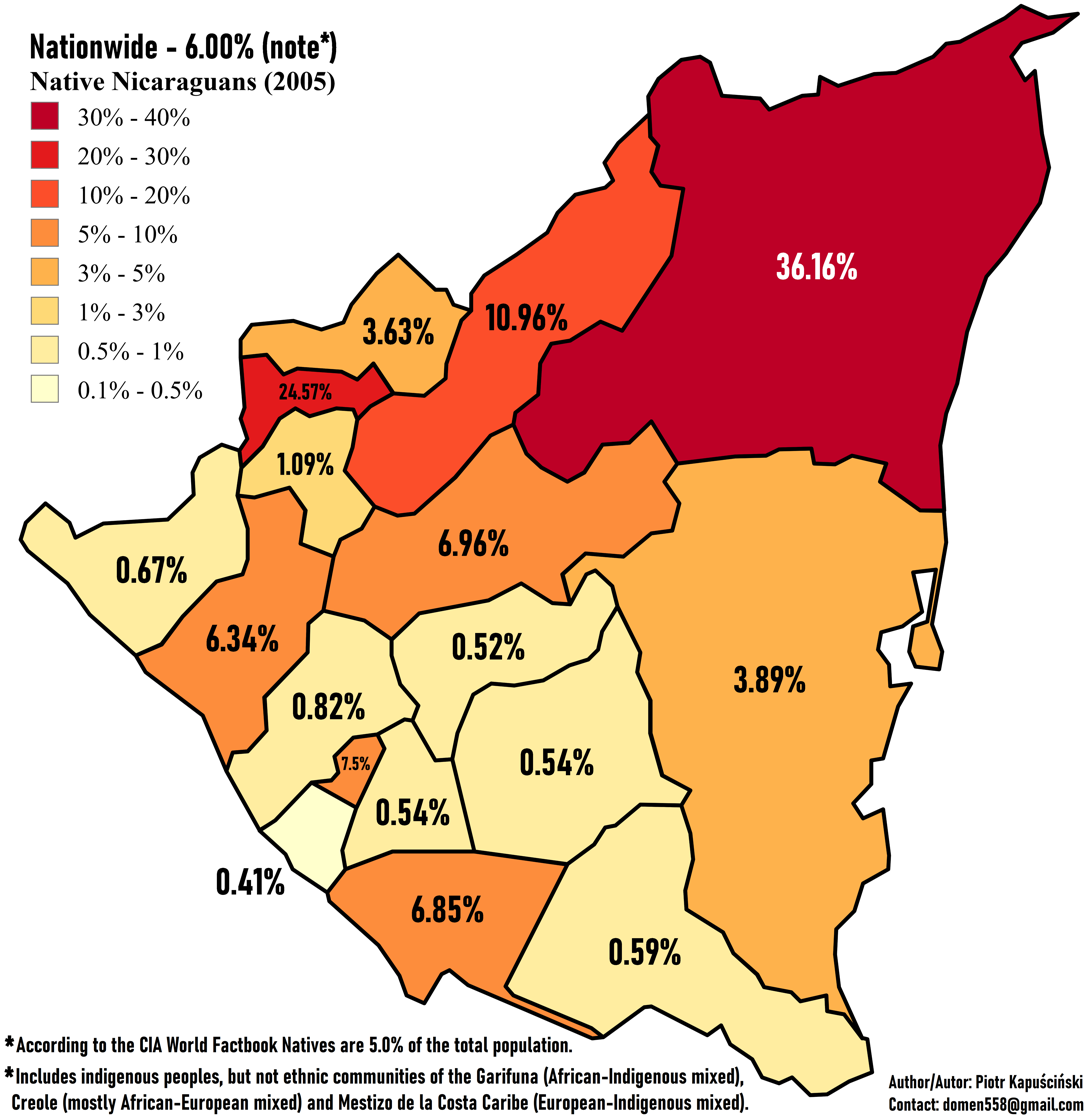
Distribution of Native Nicaraguans according to the 2005 census

Nicaraguan culture has strong folklore, music and religious traditions, deeply influenced by Indigenous, African, and European cultures, sounds, and flavors. Nicaraguan culture can further be defined in several distinct strands. The Pacific coast has strong folklore, music and religious traditions, deeply influenced by a mixed Iberian, Indigenous, and West African heritage. It was colonized by Spain and has a similar culture to other Spanish-speaking Latin American countries. The Caribbean coast of the country, on the other hand, was once a British protectorate. English is still predominant in this region and spoken domestically along with Spanish and Indigenous languages. Its culture is similar to that of Caribbean nations and territories that were or are British possessions, such as Jamaica, the Turks and Caicos Islands, Belize, the Cayman Islands, and the Bay Islands and Mosquito Coast of Honduras. The Indigenous groups that were present in the Pacific coast have largely been assimilated into the mestizo culture, however, the Indigenous peoples of the Caribbean coast have maintained distinct identities.

Nicaraguan music is a mixture of Indigenous, African, and European, especially Spanish, influences. Musical instruments include the African marimba, and others common across Central America. The marimba of Nicaragua is uniquely played by a sitting performer holding the instrument on his knees. He is usually accompanied by a bass fiddle, guitar and guitarrilla (a small guitar like a mandolin). This music is played at social functions as a sort of background music. The marimba is made with hardwood plates, placed over bamboo or metal tubes of varying lengths. It is played with two or four hammers. The Caribbean coast of Nicaragua is known for a lively, sensual form of dance music called Palo de Mayo which is very much alive all throughout the country. It is especially loud and celebrated during the Palo de Mayo festival in May. The Garífuna community exists in Nicaragua, known for its popular music called Punta.

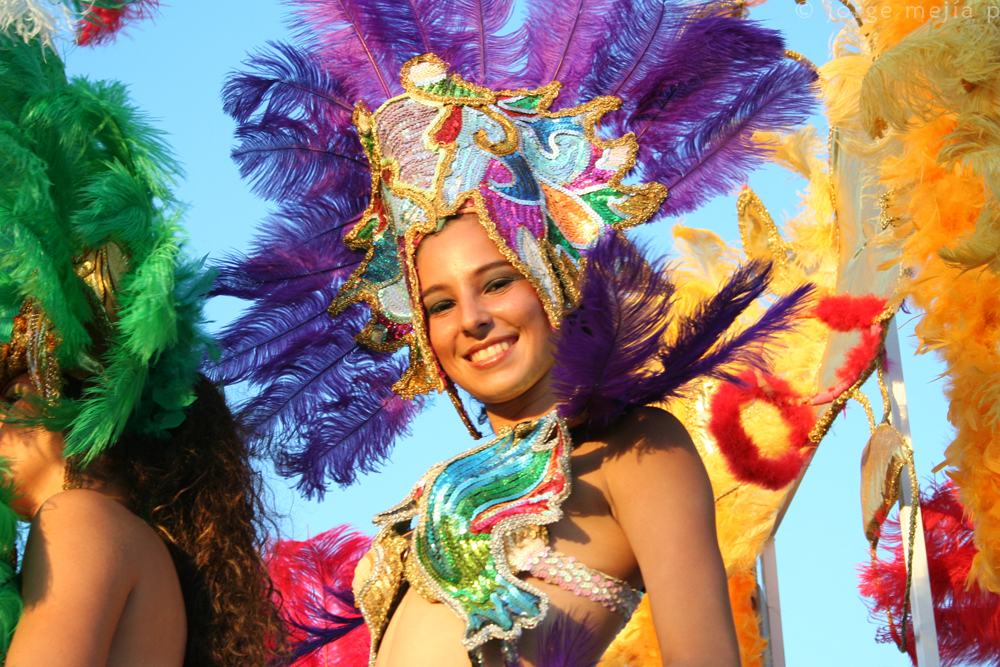
Celebrating the annual "Alegria por la vida" Carnaval in Managua, Nicaragua

Literature of Nicaragua can be traced to pre-Columbian times with the myths and oral literature that formed the cosmogonic view of the world that indigenous people had. Some of these stories are still know in Nicaragua. Like many Latin American countries, the Spanish conquerors have had the most effect on both the culture and the literature. Nicaraguan literature has historically been an important source of poetry in the Spanish-speaking world, with internationally renowned contributors such as Rubén Darío who is regarded as the most important literary figure in Nicaragua, referred to as the "Father of Modernism" for leading the modernismo literary movement at the end of the 19th century. Other literary figures include Ernesto Cardenal, Gioconda Belli, Claribel Alegría and José Coronel Urtecho, among others.

El Güegüense is a satirical drama and was the first literary work of pre-Columbian Nicaragua. It is regarded as one of Latin America's most distinctive colonial-era expressions and as Nicaragua's signature folkloric masterpiece combining music, dance and theater. The theatrical play was written by an anonymous author in the 16th century, making it one of the oldest indigenous theatrical/dance works of the Western Hemisphere. The story was published in a book in 1942 after many centuries.

=== Language ===
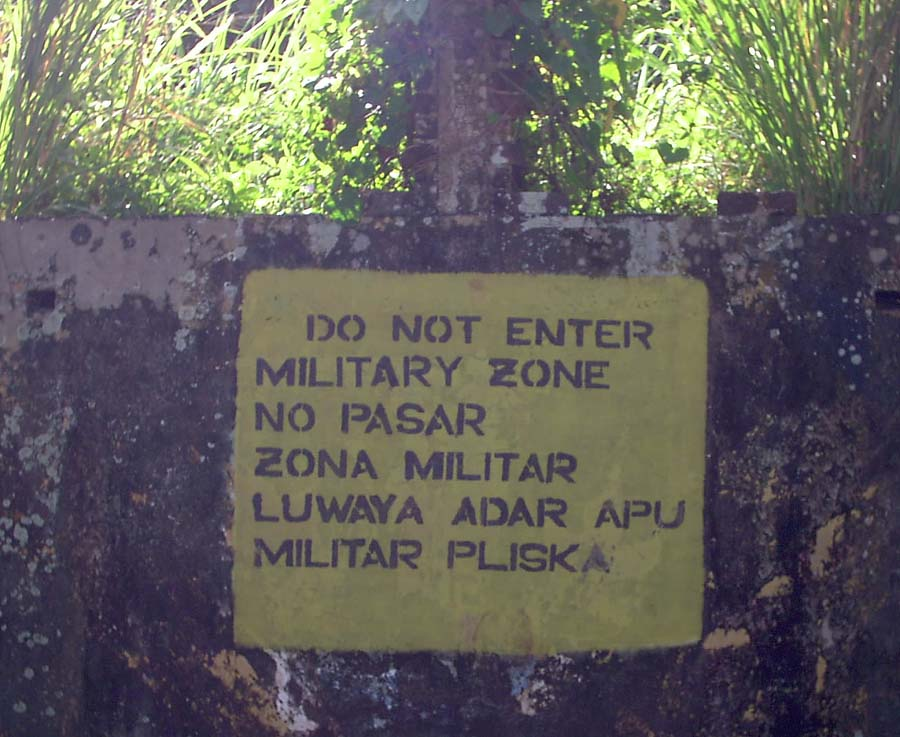
A sign in Bluefields in English (top), Spanish (middle) and Miskito (bottom).

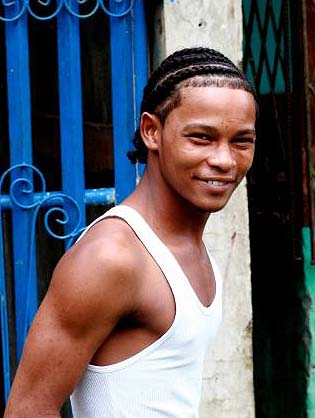
An English speaking creole from Bluefields.

Spanish is spoken by about 90% of the country's population. In Nicaragua the Voseo form is common, just as in other countries in Central and South America like Honduras, Argentina, Uruguay or coastal Colombia. Spanish has many different dialects spoken throughout Latin America, Nicaraguan Spanish is the dialect spoken in Nicaragua. In the Caribbean coast many afro-Nicaraguans and creoles speak English and creole English as their first language. Also in the Caribbean coast, many Indigenous people speak their native languages, such as the Miskito, Sumo-Mayangna, Rama and Garífuna language. In addition, many ethnic groups in Nicaragua, such as the German Nicaraguans, Chinese Nicaraguans and Palestinian Nicaraguans, have maintained their ancestral languages, which are minority languages, while also speaking Spanish and/or English. These minority languages include Chinese, Arabic, Italian, and German, among others.

The language and pronunciation varies depending on region. Some Nicaraguans pronounce the word vos with a strong s sound at the end. In the central part of the country, regions like Boaco pronounce vos without the s sound at the end. The result is vo, similar to vous in French and voi in Italian.

Nicaragua has a total of 4 extinct languages. Nicaraguan Sign Language is also of particular interest to linguists.

=== Symbols ===
The flag of Nicaragua

The flag of Nicaragua was adopted on August 27, 1971. It is based on the flag of the United States of Central America. The two blue stripes represented the Pacific Ocean and Caribbean Sea; while white symbolizes peace. A modern interpretation indicates that the color blue symbolizes justice and loyalty; while the color white represents virtue and purity. The coat of arms features an equilateral triangle which represents equality. Inside the triangle are five volcanoes, which represent the five members of the federation. The triangle also contains symbols of liberty and peace which is represented by a red Phrygian cap, white rays and a rainbow.

== See also ==
- Demographics of Nicaragua
  - List of Nicaraguans
- Criollo people
- Nicaraguan Americans
  - List of Nicaraguan Americans
- Hispanics
