= Demographics of Nicaragua =

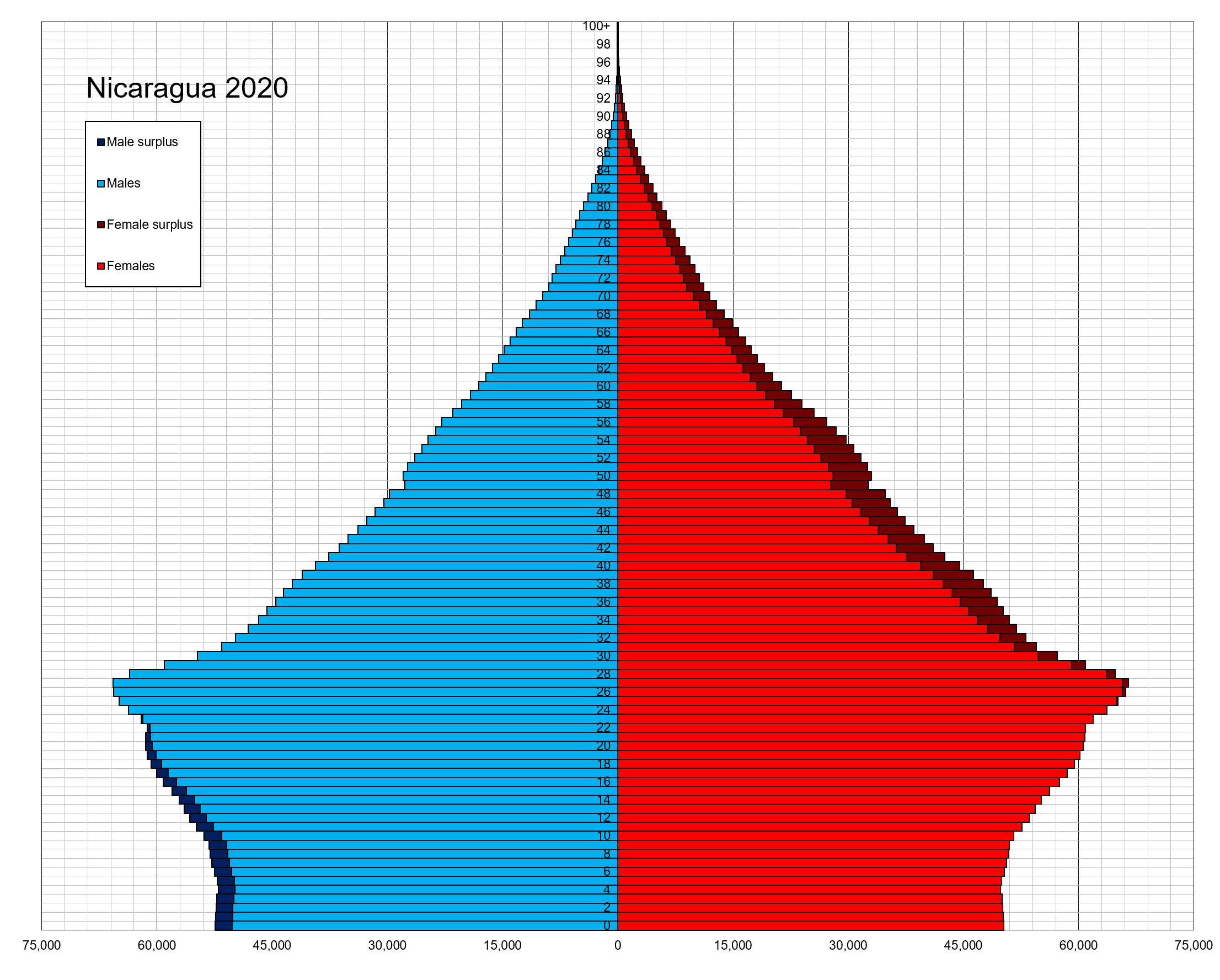
- Nicaragua population pyramid in 2020
- Population: 6,850,540
  - Year: 2021
- Growth rate: 1.855%
- Birth rate: 15.6/1,000 (2023 est.)
- Death rate: 5.0/1,000 (2021 est.)
- Life expectancy: 74.8 years
- Fertility rate: 1.8 children/woman (2023 est.)
- Infant mortality: 11.861/1,000
- Net migration rate: −1.8/1,000 (2024 est.)

Nationality
- Nationality: Nicaraguan

According to the 2022 revision of the World Population Prospects, Nicaragua has a population of 6,850,540. According to Morera-Bernal (2006) the genetic genepool of nicaraguans ir 47% European ancestry, 37%, Indigenous ancestry and 17% African ancestry. A 2014 study published in the journal Genetics and Molecular Biology, European ancestry predominates in 69% of Nicaraguans, followed by African ancestry in 20%, and lastly Indigenous ancestry in 11%. A Japanese research of "Genomic Components in America's demography" demonstrated that, on average, the ancestry of Nicaraguans is 58% European, 28% Native American, and 14% African, with a very small Near Eastern contribution. Non-genetic data from the CIA World Factbook establishes that from Nicaragua's 2016 population of 5,966,798, around 69% are mestizo, 17% white, 5% Native American, and 9% black. This fluctuates with changes in migration patterns. The population is 58% urban as of 2013.

Following the Sandinista revolution in 1979, many of the migrants who left the country were landed people of upper and middle-class origin who wanted to avoid the Sandinistas' agrarian reforms that were being carried out. A growing number of these people have returned, while many continue to live abroad.

42.5% of the population lives below the poverty line. The general poverty rate is estimated at 47.3%, although much of the population falls in the lower middle class due to low salaries and a low GDP (US$1000–3000).

The most populous city in the country is the capital city, Managua, with a population of 1.2 million (2005). As of 2005, over 4.4 million inhabitants (82%) live in the Pacific, Central and Northern regions. 2.7 million inhabitants (about 50%, not including Managua) reside in the Pacific region alone, while inhabitants in the Caribbean region only reach an estimated 700,000.

The Census Bureau in Nicaragua is the National Institute of Statistics and Census (INEC). The institution is in charge of completing censuses and surveys. INEC ran its first census in 1906, the last census was taken in 2005, it was the eighth to date.

== Population ==
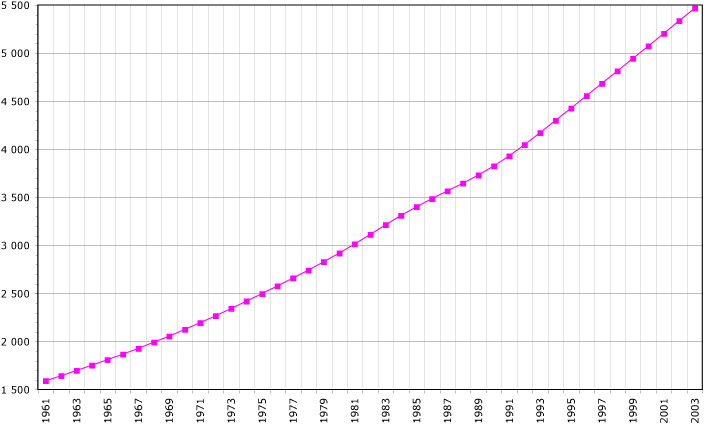
Nicaragua's total population, 2005. Number of inhabitants in thousands

According to the 2022 revision of the World Population Prospects the total population was 6,850,540 in 2021, compared to only 1,295,000 in 1950. The proportion of children below the age of 15 in 2010 was 34.5%, 60.9% was between 15 and 65 years of age, while 4.6% was 65 years or older .

Year	Total population (million)	Proportion percentage		
Year	Total population (million)	aged 0–14	aged 15–64	aged 65+
1950	1 295	43.0%	54.2%	2.8%
1955	1 508	45.2%	52.1%	2.7%
1960	1 775	47.4%	50.0%	2.5%
1965	2 063	49.2%	48.3%	2.5%
1970	2 400	48.1%	49.4%	2.5%
1975	2 798	47.1%	50.2%	2.6%
1980	3 250	47.1%	50.1%	2.7%
1985	3 710	47.1%	50.0%	2.9%
1990	4 138	46.0%	50.9%	3.2%
1995	4 659	44.0%	52.6%	3.4%
2000	5 069	39.7%	56.6%	3.8%
2005	5 439	36.2%	59.6%	4.2%
2010	5 824	33.3%	62.2%	4.5%
2015	6 223	31.3%	64.0%	4.8%
2020	6 625	29.5%	64.8%	5.7%

=== Structure of the population ===
Population Estimates by Sex and Age Group (01.VII.2009):

Age group	Male	Female	Total	%
Total	2 844 244	2 898 072	5 742 316	100
0–4	347 205	332 920	680 125	11.84
5–9	336 817	323 279	660 096	11.50
10–14	344 831	332 925	677 756	11.80
15–19	331 536	329 072	660 608	11.50
20–24	286 484	290 439	576 923	10.05
25–29	250 672	260 730	511 402	8.91
30–34	197 120	214 967	412 087	7.18
35–39	162 472	174 845	337 317	5.87
40–44	136 223	143 572	279 795	4.87
45–49	115 914	124 028	239 942	4.18
50–54	98 355	107 733	206 088	3.59
55–59	74 173	80 156	154 329	2.69
60–64	45 221	48 460	93 681	1.63
65–69	43 121	46 230	89 351	1.56
70–74	32 418	35 443	67 861	1.18
75–79	22 249	25 956	48 205	0.84
80+	19 433	27 317	46 750	0.81
Age group	Male	Female	Total	Percent
0–14	1 028 853	989 124	2 017 977	35.14
15–64	1 698 170	1 774 002	3 472 172	60.47
65+	117 221	134 946	252 167	4.39

Population Estimates by Sex and Age Group (01.07.2023):

Age group	Male	Female	Total	%
Total	3 357 138	3 446 748	6 803 886	100
0–4	328 587	314 177	642 764	
5–9	339 464	324 833	664 297	
10–14	338 766	324 761	663 527	
15–19	318 320	306 443	624 763	
20–24	299 073	290 339	589 412	
25–29	294 819	293 641	588 460	
30–34	272 934	282 281	555 215	
35–39	240 254	255 454	495 708	
40–44	209 895	231 173	441 068	
45–49	167 212	190 927	358 139	
50–54	137 219	154 183	291 402	
55–59	115 265	128 180	243 445	
60–64	97 984	111 544	209 528	
65–69	79 279	92 356	171 635	
70–74	51 336	60 269	111 605	
75–79	30 342	36 448	66 790	
80+	36 389	49 739	86 128	
Age group	Male	Female	Total	Percent
0–14	1 006 817	963 771	1 970 588	28.96
15–64	2 152 975	2 244 165	4 397 140	64.63
65+	197 346	238 812	436 158	6.41

=== Population distribution ===
Ninety percent of Nicaraguans live in the Pacific lowlands and the adjacent interior highlands. The population is 54% urban. The most populous city in Nicaragua is the capital city, Managua, with a population of 1.2 million (2005). As of 2005, over 4.4 million inhabitants live in the Pacific, Central and North regions, accounting for 82% of the population. There are 2.7 million residents in the Pacific region, not including Managua. The Caribbean region, including the Mosquito Coast, has an estimated 700,000 residents. In addition, many Nicaraguans live abroad.

=== Departments by population ===
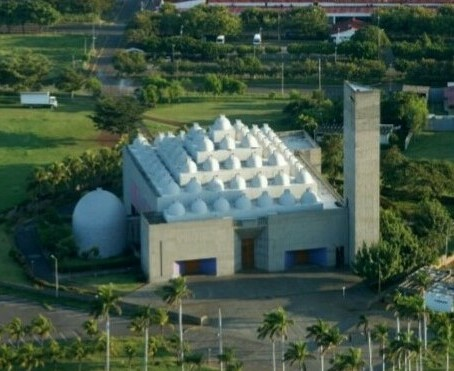
Managua

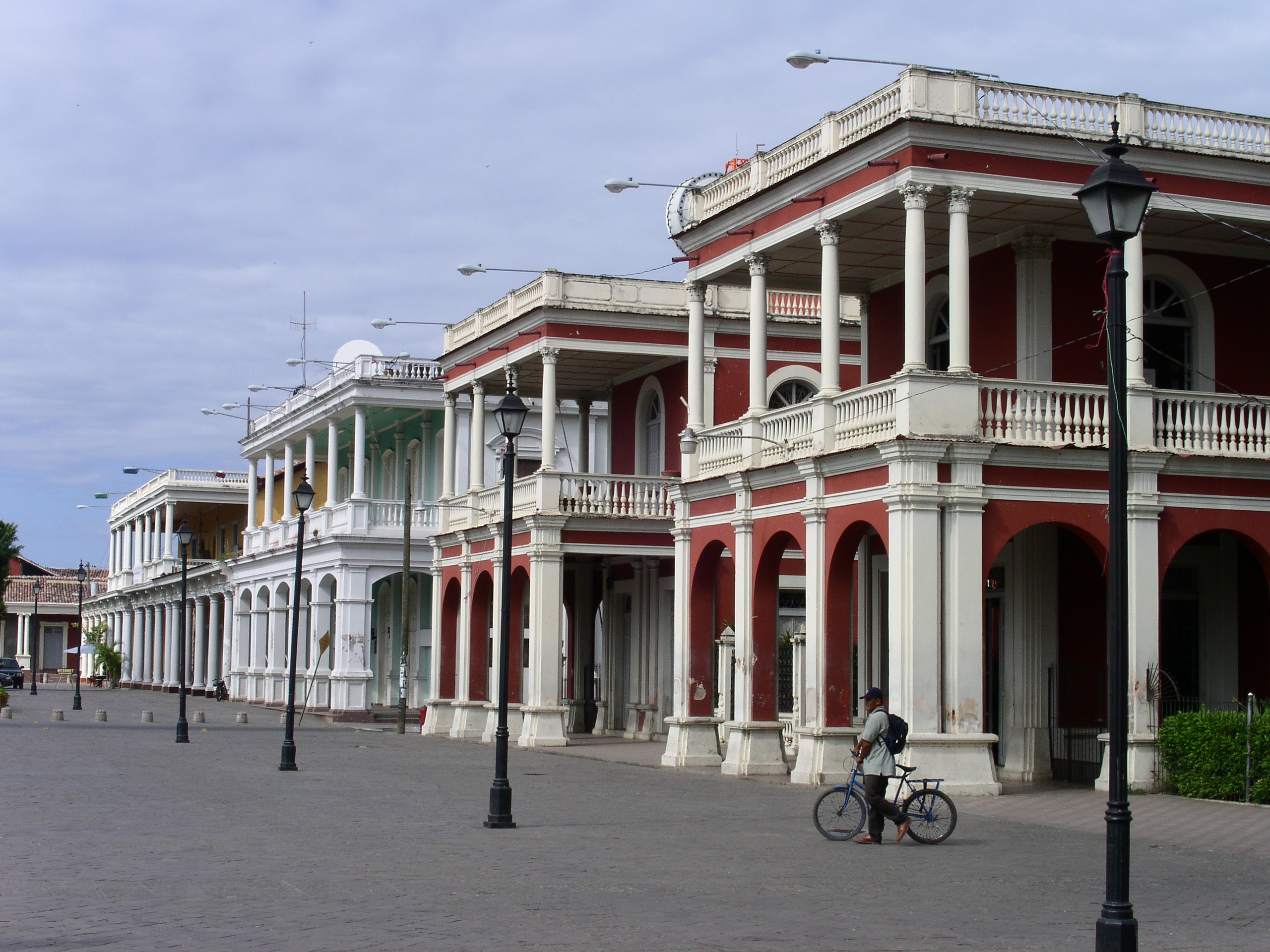
Granada

Departments by population as of 2005
Rank	City	Department	Pop. (2005)
1	Managua	Managua	1,262,978
2	Matagalpa	Matagalpa	469,172
3	Chinandega	Chinandega	378,970
4	León	León	355,779
5	Jinotega	Jinotega	331,335
6	Puerto Cabezas	RAAN	314,130
7	Bluefields	RAAS	306,510
8	Masaya	Masaya	289,988
9	Ocotal	Nueva Segovia	208,523
10	Estelí	Estelí	201,548
11	Granada	Granada	168,186
12	Jinotepe	Carazo	166,073
13	Rivas	Rivas	156,283
14	Juigalpa	Chontales	153,932
15	Boaco	Boaco	150,636
16	Somoto	Madriz	132,459
17	San Carlos	Río San Juan	95,596
18	Total	–	5,142,098

View source data.
View source data.

== Vital statistics ==
=== UN estimates ===
Registration of vital events is in Nicaragua not complete. The Population Department of the United Nations prepared the following estimates.

Period	Live births per year	Deaths per year	Natural change per year	CBR*	CDR*	NC*	TFR*	IMR*	Life expectancy		
Period	Live births per year	Deaths per year	Natural change per year	CBR*	CDR*	NC*	TFR*	IMR*	total	for males	for females
1950–1955	77 000	32 000	45 000	54.9	23.0	31.9	7.20	172	42.3	40.9	43.7
1955–1960	89 000	33 000	56 000	54.2	20.4	33.8	7.50	151	45.4	44.1	46.8
1960–1965	93 000	33 000	60 000	48.5	17.0	31.5	7.10	131	48.7	47.3	50.0
1965–1970	103 000	32 000	71 000	46.3	14.4	31.9	6.95	114	52.0	50.5	53.4
1970–1975	120 000	33 000	88 000	46.3	12.6	33.7	6.79	98	55.3	53.7	56.8
1975–1980	137 000	34 000	102 000	45.2	11.3	33.9	6.35	90	57.6	55.3	60.0
1980–1985	149 000	35 000	114 000	42.9	10.1	32.7	5.85	80	59.5	56.5	62.6
1985–1990	150 000	33 000	117 000	38.2	8.4	29.8	5.00	65	62.2	59.0	65.5
1990–1995	156 000	29 000	127 000	35.4	6.5	28.9	4.50	48	66.1	63.5	68.7
1995–2000	147 000	27 000	120 000	30.1	5.6	24.6	3.60	34	68.4	65.9	71.1
2000–2005	139 000	26 000	112 000	25.8	5.2	20.6	2.91	26	70.9	68.0	73.8
2005–2010	140 000	27 000	113 000	24.3	5.1	19.2	2.68	22	72.9	69.9	76.0
2010–2015				22.8	5.0	17.8	2.54				
2015–2020				20.9	5.1	15.8	2.42				
2020–2025				18.7	5.1	13.6	2.28				
2025–2030				17.1	5.3	11.8	2.16				
* CBR = crude birth rate (per 1000); CDR = crude death rate (per 1000); NC = natural change (per 1000); IMR = infant mortality rate per 1000 births; TFR = total fertility rate (number of children per woman)

=== Registered births and deaths ===
Year	Population	Live births	Deaths	Natural increase	Crude birth rate	Crude death rate	Rate of natural increase	Crude migration (per thousands)	TFR
1990	3,959,785								
1991	4,058,434								
1992	4,162,367								
1993	4,268,685								
1994	4,374,490								
1995	4,476,881								
1996	4,574,524								
1997	4,669,352								
1998	4,763,366								
1999	4,858,570								
2000	4,956,964								
2001	5,058,643								
2002	5,162,275								
2003	5,267,714								
2004	5,374,820								
2005	5,483,447	121,380	16,770	104,610	22.1	3.1	19.0		2.94
2006	5,522,606	123,886	16,595	107,291	22.4	3.0	19.4	−12.3	
2007	5,595,541	128,171	17,288	110,883	22.9	3.1	19.8	−6.6	2.51
2008	5,668,876	129,506	18,262	111,244	22.8	3.2	19.6	−6.5	2.49
2009	5,742,310	132,222	18,179	114,043	23.0	3.2	19.8	−6.8	2.49
2010	5,815,524	132,165	19,944	112,221	22.7	3.4	19.3	−6.6	2.46
2011	5,996,619	140,958	19,523	121,435	23.5	3.3	20.2	10.9	2.54
2012	6,071,045	142,874	20,300	122,574	23.5	3.3	20.2	−7.8	2.54
2013	6,134,270	142,756	21,381	121,375	23.3	3.5	19.8	−9.4	2.53
2014	6,198,154	143,421	22,469	120,952	23.1	3.6	19.5	−9.1	2.52
2015	6,262,703	144,597	23,540	121,057	23.1	3.8	19.3	−8.9	2.52
2016	6,327,927	139,595	23,738	115,857	22.1	3.8	18.3	−7.9	2.43
2017	6,393,824	139,487	24,300	115,187	21.8	3.8	18.0	−7.6	2.42
2018	6,460,411	139,126	24,296	114,830	21.5	3.8	17.7	−7.3	2.42
2019	6,527,691	131,673	25,340	106,333	20.1	3.9	16.2	−5.8	2.28
2020	6,595,674	124,365	33,681	90,684	18.9	5.1	13.8	−3.4	2.16
2021	6,664,000	120,473	34,999	85,474	17.5	5.0	12.5	–2.1	
2022	6,734,000	118,118	26,858	91,260	17.5	4.0	13.5		
2023		106,439	26,162	80,277	15.6	3.8	11.8		1.8
2024									
2025									

=== Demographic and Health Surveys ===
Total Fertility Rate (TFR) (Wanted Fertility Rate) and Crude Birth Rate (CBR):

Year	Total		Urban		Rural	
Year	CBR	TFR	CBR	TFR	CBR	TFR
1998	29	3,6 (2,5)	2,9 (2,0)		5,0 (3,3)	
2001	27	3,2 (2,3)	24	2,6 (1,8)	31	4,4 (3,0)
2006–2007		2,7		2,2		3,5
2011/2012		2,4		2,1		2,9

== Ethnic groups ==
Ethnic groups in Nicaragua %
1. Mestizo (45.0%)
2. White (12.0%)
3. Black (14.0%)
4. Native American (29.0%)

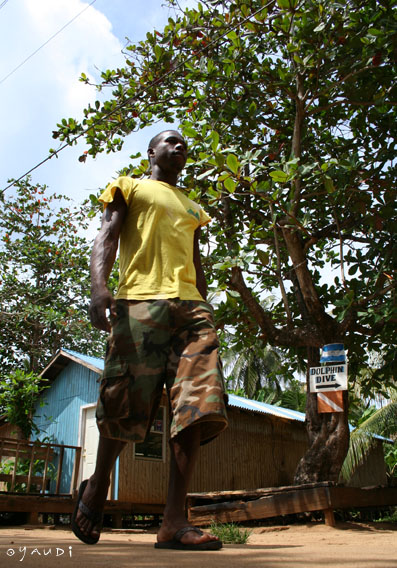
An Afro-Nicaraguan

According to the 2005 census 2,063,100 (29.9%) residents consider themselves to belong to an indigenous people or to an ethnic community. The remaining majority of the Nicaraguan population (71%) are deemed mestizo and white, with the majority of these being of Spanish, with some German, Italian, Portuguese and French ancestry. Mestizos and whites mainly reside in the western region of the country.

Possibly also a part of the black or Afro-Nicaraguan population, which mainly resides on the country's sparsely populated Caribbean (or Atlantic) coast, is included in the majority population which does not consider itself to belong to an ethnic community. In the 2005 census, there were 966,000 Creoles (14% of the total population). The Creole population is mostly of Afro-Caribbean origin, the descendants of indentured laborers brought mostly from Jamaica when the region was a British colony.

Primarily in the 19th century, Nicaragua saw several waves of immigration from European nations. In particular the northern cities of Jinotega and Matagalpa have significant populations of fourth generation Germans.

The Garifuna, a people of mixed Carib, Angolan, Congolese and Arawak descent, numbered 207,000 in 2005 (3%). 55,200 people considered themselves "Mestizo de la Costa Caribe" (mestizo of the Caribbean coast). In addition to the inhabitants who declared themselves Indigenous or Ethnic community, 13,740 answered "Other". Another 47,473 responded "Not Sure" and an additional 19,460 responded "Ignore".

=== Indigenous population ===
The Native American population, the unmixed descendants of the country's indigenous inhabitants, numbered 2,063,100 (29.9% of the total population) in 2005. Nicaragua's pre-Columbian consisted of many indigenous groups. In the western region, the Nicarao people were present along with other groups such as the Maya, Mangue, Chorotega, and Subtiaba, all five being considered Mesoamerican peoples.

The central region and the Caribbean coast of Nicaragua were mainly inhabited by speakers of Misumalpan languages and some speakers of Chibchan languages. These groups include the Miskitos (690,000 people), Matagalpa (15,240 people), Ramas (4,185 people), Sumos (9,756 people) and Ulwa (698 people).

In the 19th century, the indigenous population was more demographically significant, but they have since largely been culturally assimilated into the mestizo majority. In the mid-1980s, the government divided the department of Zelaya – consisting of the eastern half of the country — into two autonomous regions and granted the black and indigenous people of this region limited self-rule within the Republic.

Those belonging to recognized indigenous communities (2005)
Rama	53,130	0.77%	Maya	483,000	7%
Sumo	138,000	2%	Miskito	690,000	10%
Ulwa	698	0.01%	Matagalpa	15,240	0.22%
Subtiaba	69,000	1%	Nahua	552,000	8%

== Migration ==
=== Immigration ===
Relative to its overall population, Nicaragua has never experienced any large scale wave of immigrants. The total number of immigrants to Nicaragua, both originating from other Latin American countries and all other countries, never surpassed 1% of its total population prior to 1995. The 2005 census showed the foreign-born population at 1.2%, having risen 0.06% in 10 years. However, in the 19th century, Nicaragua received immigrants from Europe, who established many agricultural businesses such as coffee and sugar cane plantations, and also newspapers, hotels and banks.

The founding members of the Deutscher Club in Nicaragua, 1901

=== Emigration ===
During the Nicaraguan Revolution and the Civil War, thousands of Nicaraguans left the country. After the 1990 Nicaraguan Elections some people returned, but many more emigrated during the rest of the decade. In 1998, the Hurricane Mitch killed almost 4,000 people in the country and destroyed much of the Nicaraguan economy, as a result thousands of Nicaraguans received the TPS enabling them to emigrate to the United States as "refugees". In recent years, many Nicaraguans had left the country to escape poverty and unemployment.

Nicaraguan emigration is a recent process. During the 1990–2004 period, more than 800,000 Nicaraguans left the country, compared to 100,000 during the 1970–1989 period. According to the World Bank, in 2005 there were 683,520 Nicaraguans living outside Nicaragua legally. If those who are undocumented are counted, some sources estimate as many as 1,500,000 Nicaraguans living abroad by the end of 2005. Nicaraguans are the third largest community of Central Americans living abroad, after Guatemalans and Salvadorans. Nicaragua is also the second country in Central America by percentage of population living abroad.

Following the return of Daniel Ortega to power in the 2006 Nicaraguan general election and subsequent democratic backsliding, especially during and after the violently suppressed 2018 Nicaraguan protests, a new wave of political emigration occurred. Most political emigrants live in Costa Rica which has been a stable representative democracy since the end of the Costa Rican Civil War in 1948. Other target countries of political emigration include the United States and European countries, particularly Spain.

Remittances to Nicaragua represent about 15% of the country's GDP. In 2008 Nicaragua received close to one billion dollars in remittances; an increase from the $750,000,000 received in 2007, according to the World Bank

== Language ==
Languages of Nicaragua

Language	Speakers
Arabic	400
Chinese	7,000
English	20,334
Garífuna	1,500
Miskito	154,400
Sign language	3,000
Spanish	4,347,000
Sumo	6,700
Rama	24
Creole English	30,000

Source: Ethnologue
Languages in Nicaragua%
1. Spanish (95.3%)
2. Miskito (2.20%)

The official language of Nicaragua is Spanish, or Nicañol as Nicaraguan Spanish is sometimes referred to, and is spoken by the country's population. In Nicaragua the Voseo form is common, just as in other countries in Central and South America like Honduras, Argentina, and Uruguay. Spanish has many different dialects spoken throughout Latin America, Central American Spanish is the dialect spoken in Nicaragua.

Phonology

Some other characteristics of Nicaraguan phonology include:

- /s/ at the end of a syllable or before a consonant is pronounced like [h].
- j (/x/), is aspirated; it is soft as the /h/ in English (e.g.: Yahoo).
- Intervocalic /b/, /d/, and /g/ show no sign of reduction, and are much more pronounced than in most dialects.
- In some regions the double /l/ is pronounced with a ( "Shhh") sound, Argentina has a similar accent.
- There is no confusion between /l/ and /r/, as in the Caribbean.
- /s/, /z/ and in some cases /c/ (as in cerrar) are pronounced as [s]
- /m/ at the end of a word tends to be pronounced as [n]

Nicaraguans on the Caribbean coast speak their indigenous languages and also English. The indigenous peoples of the east who use their original language tend to also speak Spanish and/or English, the main languages being Miskito language, Sumo language, and Rama language. Creole languages are also present in the Caribbean coast, Nicaragua Creole English has 30,000 speakers.

Nicaragua has many minority groups. Many ethnic groups in Nicaragua, such as the Chinese Nicaraguans and Palestinian Nicaraguans, have maintained their ancestral languages while also speaking Spanish and/or English. Minority languages include Chinese, Arabic, German, Italian among others. Nicaragua also has a total of 3 extinct languages.

Nicaraguan Sign Language is also of particular interest to linguists.

== Religion ==
Religious Affiliation in Nicaragua (census 2005 )
Religion	Percentage
Roman Catholic	58.5%
Evangelical	21.6%
Moravian	1.6%
Jehovah's Witnesses	0.9%
None	15.7%
Other^{1}	1.6%
^{1} Includes Buddhism, Islam, and Judaism among other religions.
Source: 2005 Nicaraguan Census

Religion is a significant part of the culture of Nicaragua and forms part of the constitution. Religious freedom, which has been guaranteed since 1939, and religious tolerance is promoted by both the Nicaraguan government and the constitution. Bishops are expected to lend their authority to important state occasions, and their pronouncements on national issues are closely followed. They can also be called upon to mediate between contending parties at moments of political crisis.

Although Nicaragua has no official religion it is nominally Roman Catholic. Practicing Roman Catholics are no longer the majority and are declining while evangelical Protestant groups and Mormons are growing rapidly have been growing since the 1990s. There are also strong Anglican and Moravian communities on the Caribbean coast.

Roman Catholicism came to Nicaragua in the 16th century with the Spanish conquest and remained, until 1939, the established faith. Protestantism and various Christian sects came to Nicaragua during the 19th century, but only during the 20th century have Protestant denominations gained large followings in the Caribbean Coast of the country. Popular religion revolves around the saints, who are perceived as intermediaries between human beings and God.

Most localities, from the capital of Managua to small rural communities, honor patron saints selected from the Roman Catholic calendar with annual fiestas. In many communities, a rich lore has grown up around the celebrations of patron saints, such as Managua's Saint Dominic (Santo Domingo), honored in August with two colorful, often riotous, day-long processions through the city. The high point of Nicaragua's religious calendar for the masses is neither Christmas nor Easter, but La Purísima, a week of festivities in early December dedicated to the Immaculate Conception, during which elaborate altars to the Virgin Mary are constructed in homes and workplaces.

== See also ==
- Culture of Nicaragua
- National Institute of Statistics and Census of Nicaragua
- Ethnic groups in Central America
