= Crónica TN8 =

Nicaraguan television newscast

- Country of origin: Nicaragua

Production
- Running time: 1 hours (6am and 12pm editions); 90 minutes (6pm edition); 30 minutes (10pm edition, weekend editions, Crónica TN8 Internacionales)

Original release
- Network: TN8
- Release: September 6, 2010

Crónica TN8 (Chronicle TN8) is the news operation of TN8, led by Juan Carlos Ortega Murillo. It began in 2010, replacing El Noticiero Independiente and Noticiero 24 Horas, under a uniform brand.

Historically, it was known for its abuse of nota roja items, which caused it to compete heavily with Acción 10. It is one of the state-aligned newscasts on Nicaraguan television, consisting of four editions on weekdays (6am, 12pm, 6pm, 10pm) and a supplementary international news bulletin, Crónica TN8 Internacionales, at 5pm.

== History ==
The predecessors of Crónica TN8 are both El Noticiero Independiente and Noticiero 24 Horas. As of 1995, Telenica, as the channel was routinely called back then, planned to convert the channel into an all-news service and planned to send reporters to each department with its mobile unit.

Briceño sold the channel to Juan Carlos Ortega Murillo in January 2010. Initially, under the new administration, both newscasts were kept as they were, but were now aligned with the ruling Sandinist government. The channel, which was critical of officialism, was now devoid of criticism.

Crónica TN8 made its first edition on 6 September 2010. Initially, it had the morning edition at 5:55am, the afternoon edition at 12:55pm and the evening edition at 6:55pm. On weekends, only a short bulletin at 6:55pm aired. The ned bulletin inherited the nota roja format of Noticiero 24 Horas.

Prior to the 2018 Nicaraguan protests, its correspondent for Jinotega was Paco Espinoza Rivera. Around 2015–2016, he received threats for changing to TN8, as he previously worked for Canal 10's Acción 10. His last report was dated 24 July 2018, when a police attack took place in the city. He left Jinotega the following day as he was already being persecuted by the police, after which he migrated to the US state of Oklahoma to prevent detention. Presenter Stefanía Alemán left Crónica TN8 over its one-sided coverage of events.

On 29 September 2021, the channel started airing Crónica TN8 Internacionales at 5pm, with international headlines. In early February 2022, Crónica TN8 staff took part in a training program initiated by Russia's RT and Sputnik.
