= Acción 10 =

Nicaraguan television newscast

- Country of origin: Nicaragua

Production
- Running time: 3 hours (Acción 10 en la Mañana); 1 hour (Acción 10 Edición del Mediodía; Acción 10 Edición Estelar); 15 minutes (weekend edition)

Original release
- Network: Canal 10
- Release: January 7, 2005

Acción 10 (Action 10) is the news operation of Canal 10, owned by Grupo Ratensa. It began in 2005, replacing Telediario 10, and is among the more popular newscasts in Nicaragua, especially for its coverage of nota roja items, mainly accidents and crimes. In recent years, however, several of its staff fled Acción 10 due to several factors, key among them the lack of money.

== History ==
Canal 10 opened in 1997, but did not have a newscast until 13 August 2001. Its director was Jorge Katín, and its goal was to combat the repetitive format of the Nicaraguan newscasts of the time. Initially it counted with a single afternoon edition, plans for a second edition in the evening were in the pipeline, and it already had connections with CNN International, as well as a Saturday edition and a mobile unit. Until then, Canal 10 solely broadcast canned foreign programming (known in Spanish terminology as enlatados).

On 7 January 2005, Acción 10 launched, replacing Telediario 10. Four journalists who worked at the previous newscast (Irene Mercado, Raquel Caldera, Olmedo Morales and Erving Vega), as well as cameraman Juan Mairena, received their resignation letters from channel manager Carlos Pastora. The goal of the new newscast was to compete with TVNoticias and El Noticiero Independiente with high-impact stories.

In 2013, Xochilth Ocampo joined Canal 10 in order to continue working as a journalist, but her stay there caused friction in its editorial line and ended up becoming a mere presenter, not a reporter. The decision was taken by Mauricio Madrigal, who was critical of her affiliation with the ruling Sandinista National Liberation Front. She left the team in August 2018. On 22 August 2018, in the midst of anti-government protests, channel executive Carlos Pastora left because he rejected proposals from TN8 to hire its officialist journalist Óscar Ortiz and align it with the ruling administration. Until Pastora's rejection to hand over control of Acción 10 to officialist interests, the Ortega governmentnever investigate the supposed illicit acts which have since become critical of the regime.

In 2026, several journalists working for the newscast left en masse as a result of an advertising shortfall. The staff fears that it will be the next newscast to fall under an officialist lens.
