= Xiomara Blandino =

Nicaraguan beauty pageant titleholder

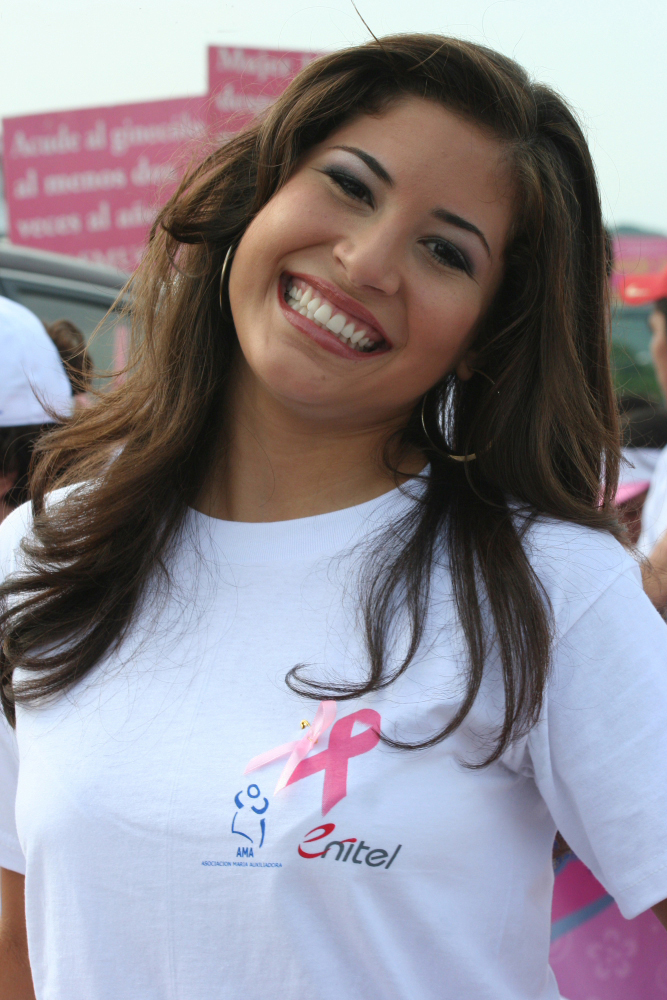
- Born: Xiomara Gioconda Blandino Artola; September 10, 1984 (age 42); Managua, Nicaragua
- Other name: Xiomara Blandino
- Height: 5 ft 7 in (1.70 m)
- Spouse: Juan Carlos Ortega Murillo
- Beauty pageant titleholder
- Title: Miss Nicaragua 2007
- Hair color: Brunette
- Eye color: Brown
- Major competitions: Miss Nicaragua 2007; (Winner); Miss Universe 2007; (Top 10)

Xiomara Blandino (born September 10, 1984) is a Nicaraguan architect, model and beauty pageant titleholder who won the title of Miss Nicaragua 2007. She represented Nicaragua at the Miss Univese 2007, finishing among the Top 10 semifinalists.

== Pageantry ==
=== Miss Universe 2007 ===
In 2007, Blandino won the title of Miss Nicaragua, earning the right to represent the nation at Miss Universe 2007 and succeed Miss Universe 2006 Zuleyka Rivera of Puerto Rico. At the international competition, Blandino became only the second representative of Nicaragua to place in the semifinals and first in 29 years. Blandino eventually finished in the Top 10. The pageant was won by Riyo Mori of Japan.

== Personal life ==
Blandino is married to Juan Carlos Ortega Murillo, the son of Nicaraguan President Daniel Ortega and Co-President Rosario Murillo. She appears alongside Juan Carlos in officialist posts on social media. Upon marriage, she was promoted to co-director of TN8. Since 2022, she has been barred from entering Camila Ortega's Nicaragua Diseña.

Awards and achievements
Preceded by Cristiana Frixione	Miss Nicaragua; 2007	Succeeded by Thelma Rodríguez
Preceded by Cristiana Frixione	Miss Continente Americano Nicaragua; 2007	Succeeded by Thelma Rodríguez
