= Chinese Nicaraguans =

Ethnic group

Total population
- 14,000

Regions with significant populations
- Bluefields, Puerto Cabezas, Managua

Languages
- Nicaraguan Spanish, Mandarin, Cantonese, Hokkien, others

Religion
- Buddhism and Christianity

Related ethnic groups
- Chinese Cubans, Overseas Chinese

Chinese Nicaraguans (simplified Chinese: 尼加拉瓜华人; traditional Chinese: 尼加拉瓜華人; pinyin: Níjiālāguā huá rén; Spanish: Sino-nicaragüenses) are Nicaraguans of Chinese ancestry who immigrated to or born in Nicaragua. They are part of the Chinese diaspora.

Chinese people first arrived in Nicaragua's Caribbean coast in the latter part of the 19th century and most of them settled in cities such as Bluefields, El Bluff, Laguna de Perlas and Puerto Cabezas. The Chinese immigrants dominated the commerce of the main coastal towns on the Caribbean coast prior to 1879. Then in the late 19th century, they began migrating to the Pacific lowlands of the country.

== History ==
The Chinese were thought to have arrived in Nicaragua in the late 19th century, the majority of which came from China's Guǎngdōng (广东) province. This supposition remained unsubstantiated until the second census (in 1920) revealed that 400 citizens of Chinese nationality lived in Nicaragua. According to documents, the population of Puerto Cabezas in the R.A.A.N. department was formed not only by the Miskitos, but by communities of Jamaicans, Germans and also Chinese in 1925. Also, the community of Chinese immigrants in Bluefields was thought to be the largest in Central America. The first Chinese consul came to Nicaragua in 1930.

Many Chinese in Nicaragua committed themselves to the commerce industry and opened businesses. They also dedicated themselves to the candy, soap, and clothing industries. They dominated the commerce of the main coastal towns on the Caribbean coast prior to 1979.

== Immigration ==
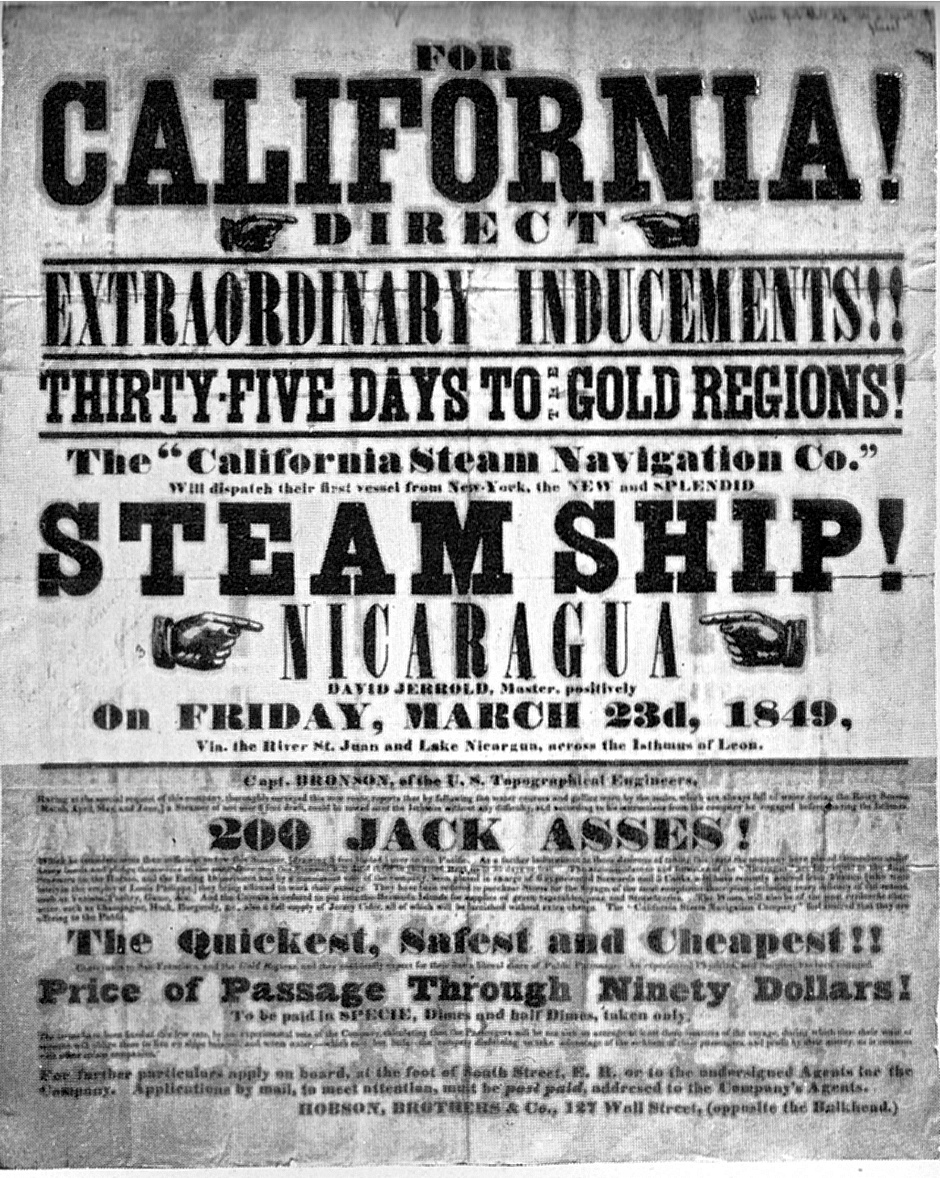
A California Gold Rush handbill listing Nicaragua as a shortcut

Although information about when the Chinese first arrived in Nicaragua is scarce, Fernando Centeno Chiong, a Nicaraguan historian, journalist and university professor of Chinese descent, published an article in La Prensa about the presence of the Chinese. Chiong wrote that there are some references that exist stating that the Chinese first arrived in Nicaragua in the mid-19th century, most notably during the California Gold Rush, in which people from all over the world traveled to California to mine for gold, tens of thousands of whom travelled by steamboats operated by the Accessory Transit Company, whose director was Commodore Cornelius Vanderbilt. The steamboats' course went up the San Juan River, a site that had been proposed for the Nicaragua Canal, Chiong wrote:

"...It is possible that between the thousands of passengers who made that passage there were Chinese citizens who remained in Nicaragua, attracted by the natural beauty and the hospitality of a country that continues maintaining those same characteristics to the immigrants of different nationalities that have already made Nicaragua their second mother country."

— Fernando Centeno Chiong

During that time, there were restrictions that prohibited the entrance of Asian citizens in the country, in spite of which, many of them defied the prohibition and settled in what is thought to have been the first Chinese presence in the Americas, perhaps before the arrival of these citizens to Peru or Panama.

Shortly after World War II, which began in 1939 and ended in 1945, large quantities of Chinese began arriving in Nicaragua, but during the 1979 Sandinista revolution, many fled to nearby Honduras, Costa Rica, and the United States.

=== Migration to the Pacific Coast ===
The Chinese had begun heading to the Pacific side of Nicaragua and therefore started to settle in the cities of Managua, Granada, Leon, and Masaya at the end of the 19th century. The majority of them were men, many of whom converted to Christianity, and married Nicaraguan women, introducing the country to last names such as: Lau, Sujo, Chang, Cheng, Siu, Law, Quant, Chow, Chiong, Kuan, Wong, Samqui, Saint and Loyman, all of which represent the descendants of the first immigrants. It is approximated that the Taiwanese are descendants of 15 families. Also, there are an estimated 7,000 people who speak Chinese.

== Clubs and associations ==
=== Chinese Club and the Chinese Nicaraguan Association ===
The first club founded for Chinese Nicaraguans, Club Chino (Chinese Club), was conformed in the South Atlantic region on Nicaragua's Caribbean coast. It wasn't until the 1940s that the club expanded into the capital city of Managua, after which the Asociación China Nicaragüense (Chinese Nicaraguan Association) was founded and became one of the most active and important associations of Nicaragua, due to the great economic power that the Chinese represented in the nation.

=== Chinese Nicaraguan Association after the Sandinista revolution ===
During the Sandinista revolution, many Chinese Nicaraguans emigrated to neighboring countries and the United States, causing the association to be inactive for approximately 10 years. That changed, however, in 1992, after some members approached the Chinese ambassador and expressed to him the importance to celebrate the Republic of China's Double Tenth Day (双十节).

Other active clubs/associations include the Club de Jóvenes Chinos de Nicaragua (Club of Chinese Teens of Nicaragua).

== Notable persons ==
- Arlen Siu - Martyr of the Sandinista revolution

== See also ==
- China–Nicaragua relations
- Buddhism in Nicaragua
- Nicaragua
- Nicaraguan
- Demographics of Nicaragua
- Culture of Nicaragua
- Asian Latin American
