= Miss Nicaragua 2007 =

- Date: March 17, 2007
- Presenters: Ivan Taylor & Sharon Amador
- Venue: Teatro Nacional Rubén Darío, Managua, Nicaragua
- Broadcaster: Televicentro
- Entrants: 17
- Winner: Xiomara Blandino; Managua

Miss Nicaragua 2007 pageant was held on March 17, 2007 in Managua after weeks of events. At the conclusion of the final night of competition, the winner represented Nicaragua at Miss Universe 2007.

== Results ==
=== Placements ===
Placement	Contestant
Miss Nicaragua 2007	Managua – Xiomara Blandino
Miss Nicaragua Earth 2007	Europa Nicaragua – Iva Grijalva Pashova
1st Runner-Up	Granada – Tatiana Pilarte
2nd Runner-Up	Tipitapa – Daniela Lacayo
Top 7	Corn Islands – Scarleth Archibold; Estelí – Itzamara Sobalvarro; RACCN – Charlotte Cruz

== Official Contestants ==
State	Contestant
Achuapa	Marina Soledad Espinal
Chinandega	Karen Salgado
Ciudad Dario	Gixa Zelaya
Corn Islands	Scarleth Archibold
Estelí	Itzamara Sobalvarro
Europa Nica	Iva Grijalva Pashova
Granada	Tatiana Pilarte
La Trinidad	Xiurel Picado
Leon	Jackeline Mendoza
Managua	Xiomara Blandino
Masaya	Tania Molina
Matagalpa	Adyari Callejas
Nueva Segovia	Martha Lorena Reyes
RACCN	Charlotte Cruz
Río San Juan	Michel Rantanen
Rivas	Karen Corea
Tipitapa	Daniela Lacayo

== Judges ==
- Peter Bernal - Journalist of Miami Herald Newspaper
- Luzmila Kojevnikova - Fashion Designer
- Columba Calvo - Mexican Ambassador in Nicaragua
- Oscar Romero - Fashion Stylist
- Aida Lopez - Representative of AFN (American Nicaraguan Foundation)
- Jannet D'Sandoval - Owner of G&B BOUTIQUE
- Ana Cecilia Arguello - Operations Manager of BANPRO S.A
- William Garcia - Creative Director of JVT Advisors S.A
- Emilia Vargas - Professional Event Coordinatior
