= Juan Carlos Ortega Murillo =

Nicaraguan businessman and musician

- Born: 17 October 1981 (age 44); Managua, Nicaragua
- Education: Central American University, Managua
- Occupations: Businessman, rock musician
- Spouse: Xiomara Blandino
- Children: 1
- Parents: Daniel Ortega (father); Rosario Murillo (mother)

Juan Carlos Ortega Murillo (born 17 October 1981) is a Nicaraguan oligarch, businessman and rock musician, son of Daniel Ortega and Rosario Murillo. He is the owner of the state advertising agency Difuso Comunicaciones, two radio stations (Radio 1 and Rock FM) and two television channels (TN8 and La Rock 22).

== Biography ==
Juan Carlos Ortega was born to the presidential couple on October 17, 1981. In his childhood, he had problems speaking, which caused him to receive help from a specialist. He was raised by Alicia Romero, alongside some of his brothers and sisters (Daniel Edmundo, Laureano y Carlos Enrique) because his parents were occupied with their political life. He followed some of his father's visits to the United States to take part in UN general assemblies. Since his childhood, he had had a strong ideological connection to the FSLN, unlike the rest of the Ortega-Murillo children, to an extent that the whole family believed that the defeat of the party in the 1990 elections was a "war". After this, Rosario Murillo started raising Juan Carlos again and ordered him to build a music studio at home, which offered piano, guitar and drum classes, among other instruments.

At the end of his baccalaurate, Rosario Murillo gave him the chance to study at the Media course at the Central American University of Managua, being the tutor of his thesis. He had a relatively normal lifestyle in his university years, dedicated to studies, music and parties, but without excesses. In a 2007 profile given to La Prensa, he was considered to be "the successor of Sandino".

He was involved in the production of Drunk Wedding, partly financed by INTUR, since 2011, as a cameraman. INTUR spent US$400,000 in its production as a means to boost tourism to Nicaragua. The promotion of the movie by the Sandinist government did not coincide with how Paramount promoted it, and the release did not match the expectations.

The US Department of Treasury sanctioned Juan Carlos Ortega on July 17, 2020.

== Musical career ==
Juan Carlos Ortega founded Nicaraguan rock band Ciclo in the 1990s. The band performed in bars in Managua and in other departments. In his gatherings with band members, there were no political references, only discussions about their favorite bands.

== Media career ==
In 2008, following the return of the FSLN party to power, he founded Difuso Comunicaciones. In late 2009, using a US9,7 million fund from Albanisa, he bought TN8, up until then an independent television outlet, and began aligning it with his interests. A second television station in the name of Difuso Comunicaciones was awarded in 2015, Difuso 22, but was suspended in the wake of his US sanction. Months later, it returned under a new name, La Rock 22.

== Personal life ==
Personal interests of him include, according to a December 2024 analysis of his X tweets from 2018 to 2024, dogs, the beach, Che Guevara, The Simpsons, anime (especially One Piece) and other pop culture interests, a sharp contrast from his father's ideas. The most active days on his X account were the period between March 5 and 11, 2024, which included the public announcement of the death of Akira Toriyama, which he said, in two separate tweets, that "without Akira Toriyama, the world would be a whole lot greyer", and that "without Akira Toriyama, there would be no One Piece phenomenon". He is also known for his cooking skills and is also a foodie.

His interest in rock music was derived from his mother, Rosario Murillo. He uses his media outlets (Rock FM and TN8) to promote the Nicaraguan music scene.

Juan Carlos prefers American cultural products, his three go-to streaming platforms are Netflix, Max and Disney+. His favorite television series and movie franchises include BoJack Horseman, How I Met Your Mother, Mafalda, SpongeBob SquarePants, South Park, Saint Seiya, Futurama, Back to the Future, Bridesmaids, Adventure Time, The Sopranos, The Office, Star Wars, Batman, Kimitachi wa Dō Ikiru ka, Breaking Bad and Looney Tunes.

Among his close circle of friends, he has Noel Portocarrero (Ciclo vocalist), Hazel Bojorge (former owner of the RockNica page and also worked at an NGO with Zoilamérica, who left Nicaragua in 2013), Rock FM director Lino Alvarado and its announcers Miguel Halvey and Henry Green, video producer Harold González (alias "Zurial", responsible for the production of Juan Carlos' music videos), TN8 presenter Marcio Vargas and Joaquín Vargas (alias "Morning"), who even appears next to Juan Carlos in some videos produced by the May 4 Sandinist Movement.

Juan Carlos Ortega is married to Xiomara Blandino. The two gave birth to a child, Juan Carlos Adrián, in February 2024, and held a baby shower event for him on February 16. Juan Carlos did not appear in the photos.
