= El Güegüense =

16th century satirical drama from Nicaragua

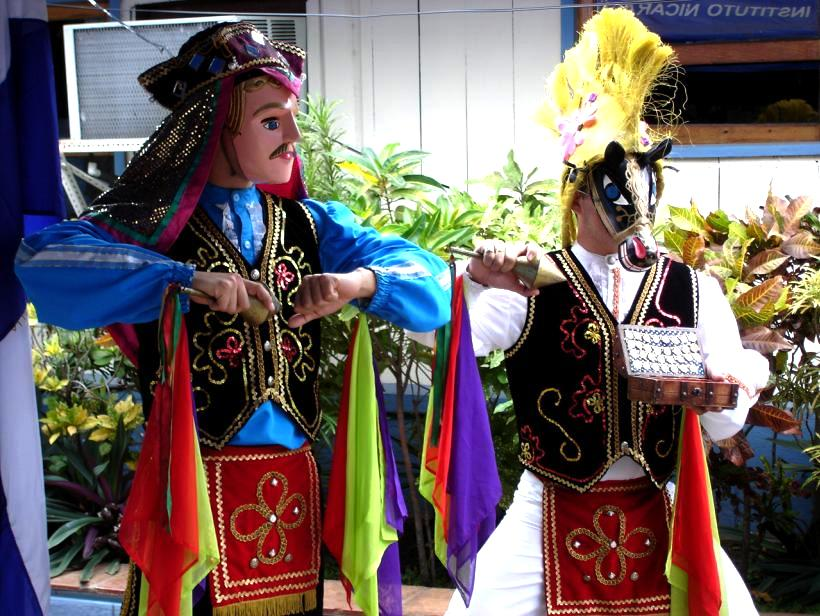
- El Güegüense
- Written by: Anonymous
- Characters: Güegüense; Don Forcico; Don Ambrosio; Governor Tastuanes; Captain Alguacil Mayor; The Royal Clerk; The Royal Assistant; Doña Suche Malinche; The four machos
- Original language: Nahuat and Spanish
- Genre: Satirical drama

Premiere
- Date premiered: 16th century

El Güegüense
- Genre: Satirical drama performance
- Date: 17–27 January
- Frequency: Annual
- Locations: Diriamba, Nicaragua

El Güegüense
- UNESCO Intangible Cultural Heritage
- Country: Nicaragua
- Reference: 00111
- Region: Latin America and the Caribbean

Inscription history
- Inscription: 2008 (3rd session)
- List: Representative

El Güegüense (Spanish pronunciation: [el ɣweˈɣwen.se]; also known as Macho Ratón, pronounced [ˈma.tʃo raˈton]) is a satirical drama and was the first literary work of post-Colonial Nicaragua. It is regarded as one of Latin America's most distinctive colonial-era expressions and as Nicaragua's signature folkloric masterpiece combining music, dance and theater. There was also a monument built in the center of a rotonda (roundabout) in Managua, in its honor. El Güegüense is performed during the feast of San Sebastián in Diriamba (Carazo department) from 17 to 27 January.

== Origin ==
The theatrical play was written by an anonymous author in the 16th century, making it one of the oldest indigenous theatrical/dance works of the Western Hemisphere. It was passed down orally for many centuries until it was finally written down and published into a book in 1942. According to the first written version the plot has 314 lines and was originally written in both Nahuat and Spanish.

=== Etymology ===
The name of the play comes from its main character, El Güegüense, which is derived from the Nahuat word Wewej, meaning 'old man' or 'wise man'.

== History ==
"El Güegüense" represents folklore of Nicaragua, therefore, UNESCO proclaimed it a "Masterpiece of the Oral and Intangible Heritage of Humanity" in 2005 making Nicaragua the only country in Central America and one of six in Latin America to have two proclaimed masterpieces by UNESCO.

== Characters ==
The play includes fourteen characters.

- The three mestizos:
  - Güegüense, and his sons Don Forcico and Don Ambrosio
- The Spanish authorities:
  - Governor Tastuanes
  - Captain Alguacil Mayor
  - the Royal Clerk
  - the Royal Assistant
- The women:
  - Doña Suche Malinche and her two accompanying ladies
- The four beasts of burden; referred to as machos:
  - Macho-moto
  - Macho-viejo
  - Macho-mohino
  - Macho-guajaqueño

== Language ==
The language is Spanish with intermixed portions of Nicarao (Nahuat), and this piece has sometimes been claimed to be a result of Spanish and Nahuat mixed or creole language. However, there is no actual evidence for this.

== Social controversy ==
Because deception for monetary gain is central to the plot of "El Güegüense", the play frequently is cited by newspaper editorials as a kind of symbolic archetype for perceived corrupt politicians or unaccountable public institutions. Unpredictable election returns also have been attributed to the heritage of the masked "El Güegüense" figure reflected in an electorate skilled at masking their true voting intent, notably so with the FSLN party's crushing, unanticipated defeat at the polls in 1990. While the role of "El Güegüense" as the highest expression of Nicaraguan folkloric art is secure, the overt theme of the play–entry into the aristocratic lifestyle through deceptive means–is frequently held at arm's length in political speeches as contrary to the current vision of national growth occurring through hard work, economic diversification, and manufacturing exports.

== See also ==
- Culture of Nicaragua

== Bibliography ==
- Brinton, Daniel Garrison (1883), The Güegüence: a comedy ballet in the Nahuatl-Spanish dialect of Nicaragua. Philadelphia: D. G. Brinton. (online at archive.org)
