= Albanisa =

Venezuelan-Nicaraguan company

Alba de Nicaragua, S.A., better known as ALBANISA is a joint Venezuelan-Nicaraguan company operating in Nicaragua, being jointly owned by Venezuelan oil company PDVSA and its Nicaraguan counterpart PETRONIC. Since its inception, it has been accused of criticism and embezzlement.

== History ==
The fund was established in 2007, following Daniel Ortega's return to presidency, and the signing of a joint agreement to bring Venezuelan oil imports to Nicaragua. In late August 2009, the Nicaraguan Energy Institute (INE) signed an agreement with energy provider Unión Fenosa and ALBANISA, which up until then had no experience in the energy industry. Criticism emerged over the 15-year US$500 million deal, citing lack of supervision in the Nicaraguan market.

One of its most notable acts was the acquisition of the formerly private television channel TN8 in late 2009, for the sum of US$9.7 million, as the channel had been indebted since 2000 and had been negotiating with the fund since earlier in 2009. By January 25, 2010, the channel was now under the control of musician and businessman Juan Carlos Ortega, son of Daniel Ortega.

The company acquired Hotel Seminole in Managua in 2009; it closed on June 15, 2018.

ALBANISA created BanCorp in 2015; the bank was acquired by the government in 2019 and was subsequently shut down.

The US government sanctioned ALBANISA on January 29, 2019 in a tweet that referred the company as "PDVSA's slush fund".
