= Immigration to Nicaragua =

First generation immigrants account for less than 1% of the population of Nicaragua, or about 50,000 people. Immigrants have come from neighboring countries, Europe, Asia and elsewhere. In the past there was also an intake of African slaves. These immigrants have combine with the established European settlers and indigenous Mestizos people to give Nicaragua a wide cultural mix. Immigration into Nicaragua has recently increased after a considerable drop in the decades between 1950 and 1980.

== Currently and statistics ==
According to data from 2020, people born in Honduras represent the largest group of immigrants in Nicaragua, with 31,09% of the total, followed by people from Costa Rica and the United States.

Place	Country	2020
1	Honduras	13,110
2	Costa Rica	11,281
3	United States	3,775
4	El Salvador	2,557
5	Guatemala	1,843
6	Cuba	984
7	Mexico	885
8	Spain	480
9	Colombia	467
10	Panama	423
11	Germany	313
12	Argentina	281
13	Netherlands	278
14	Canada	262
15	Peru	237
16	Russia	202
17	Italy	198
18	Senegal	195
19	Venezuela	165
20	France	154
21	China	144
22	Chile	130
23	Brazil	126
24	Antigua and Barbuda	123
25	Algeria	117
26	Ecuador	115
27	Switzerland	86
27	Bahamas	86
29	Ethiopia	83
30	Ukraine	80
TOTAL		42,167

== History ==
=== Early of immigration ===
The Nicaragua immigration began with the arrival of the first conqueror Gil González de Ávila, in April 1523. after began arriving soldiers, missionaries, cures and Castilian laborers, some stayed, but the majority re-emigrated to Peru. So also came first African blacks slaves of the Europeans. The Spaniards lived in towns and villages founded for them, the Indians were forced to live in so-called Indian villages. The cities founded by the Spaniards were León, Granada, and Nueva Segovia, the towns of Santa María de la Esperanza and Villa Hermosa (both close to Nueva Segovia), New Jaen (near the Great Lake), the Villa de Nuestra Señora de Rivas and the town of El Realejo founded to assist the rapid growth of the port of Possession. All the others were Indian villages such as Sutiaba, Jalteva, Sébaco, Matagalpa, Metapa, etc. In the Caribbean, from 1640 there was a growth of zambos, because to the arrival of a Portuguese slave ship who settled in the Mosquito Coast, close to the coast of Cabo Gracias a Dios in Honduras, these slaves were mixed with some natives of the region.

=== European immigration ===
The first Europeans immigrants to Nicaragua began arriving in 1524 with the troops, priests and laborers who came with Francisco Hernández de Córdoba, the Spanish conqueror of Nicaragua, These were from regions near Seville, Puerto de Palos, and Cádiz. In the sixteenth century, some pirates from England, Holland, and France were settled in the Mosquito Coast. In the late of the seventeenth century these abandoned the pirataje and engaged in the commerce, also occurred some mixtures between these European pirates with the Indians of the Mosquito Coast. So founded the town of Blawveld (after called Bluefields by the Britons) since the seventeenth century. However, during the three centuries that lasted the Spanish colony (1524-1821) immigrants in Nicaragua were mostly originating from the Iberian Peninsula, There was a very small number of immigrants from friendly countries of Colonial Spain, from the Catholic populations in Italy, France, Ireland, Austria, and the Germans principalities of the south. After the independence traders from England, France, Germany and Italy arrived to reside in Nicaragua and do business, but most moved to Matagalpa, mainly Germans since the construction of coffee fincas, while the Britons regained the Mosquito Coast after withdrawal in the early nineteenth century.

== Chinese immigration ==
The first Chinese immigrants arrived in Nicaragua on the coast of the Central American country in the second half of the nineteenth century. As the first members of the Chinese colonies in the Americas, these immigrants came to Nicaragua to escape the chaotic situation in China for that time. The majority of them came from the province of Guangdong, which was what had relatively less control over their ports. the travelers enter to San Juan del Norte navigating the river of the same name and then the lake of Granada, to disembark at the port of La Virgen in Rivas, moving overland to San Juan del Sur, where they took another ship to California. However, the Chinese people continued to arrive, many of them illegally by bribing officials. They focused mainly on agriculture, fishing, and retail trade. In the mid-1920s, was performed a census where it was made known that Bluefields had a population of 4,000 inhabitants, of whom five hundred were pure Chinese.
