= Culture of Nicaragua =

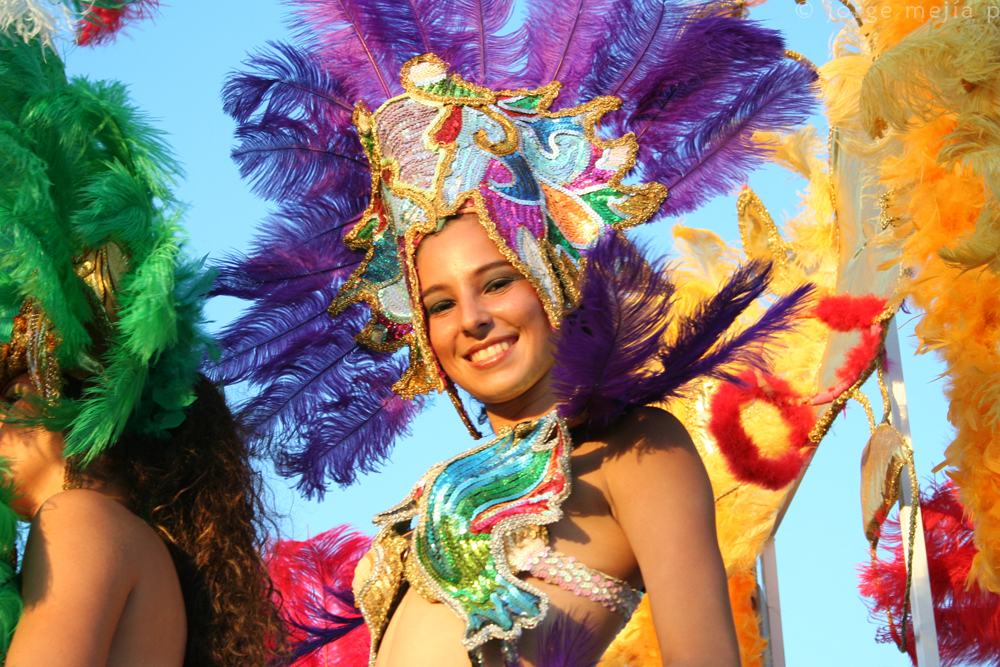
Celebrating the annual "Alegría por la vida" Carnaval in Maua

Life in Nicaragua

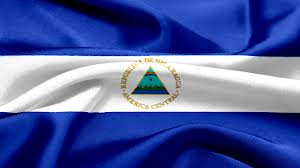

Cuisine
Culture
Demographics
Education
Holidays
Human Rights
Literature
Music
Politics
Religion
Tourism

Culture of Nicaragua is a fusion of Mesoamerican, Chibcha, and Spanish influence. The western part was colonized by the Spanish and its culture is similar to western El Salvador in that western Nicaragua was dominated by the Nahua people, specifically the Nicarao, a branch of the Pipil people. Nahua heritage can still be seen in Nicaraguan culture especially in its cuisines, the etymologies of many of its place names, and even DNA analysis. While western Nicaragua is mostly Indigenous of Nahua or Oto-manguean origin, eastern Nicaragua is mostly of Chibcha, Miskito, and African origin.

The northern region, however, is inhabited by Indigenous people and descendants of Europeans, mostly of German and Spanish descent.

== Culture and language ==
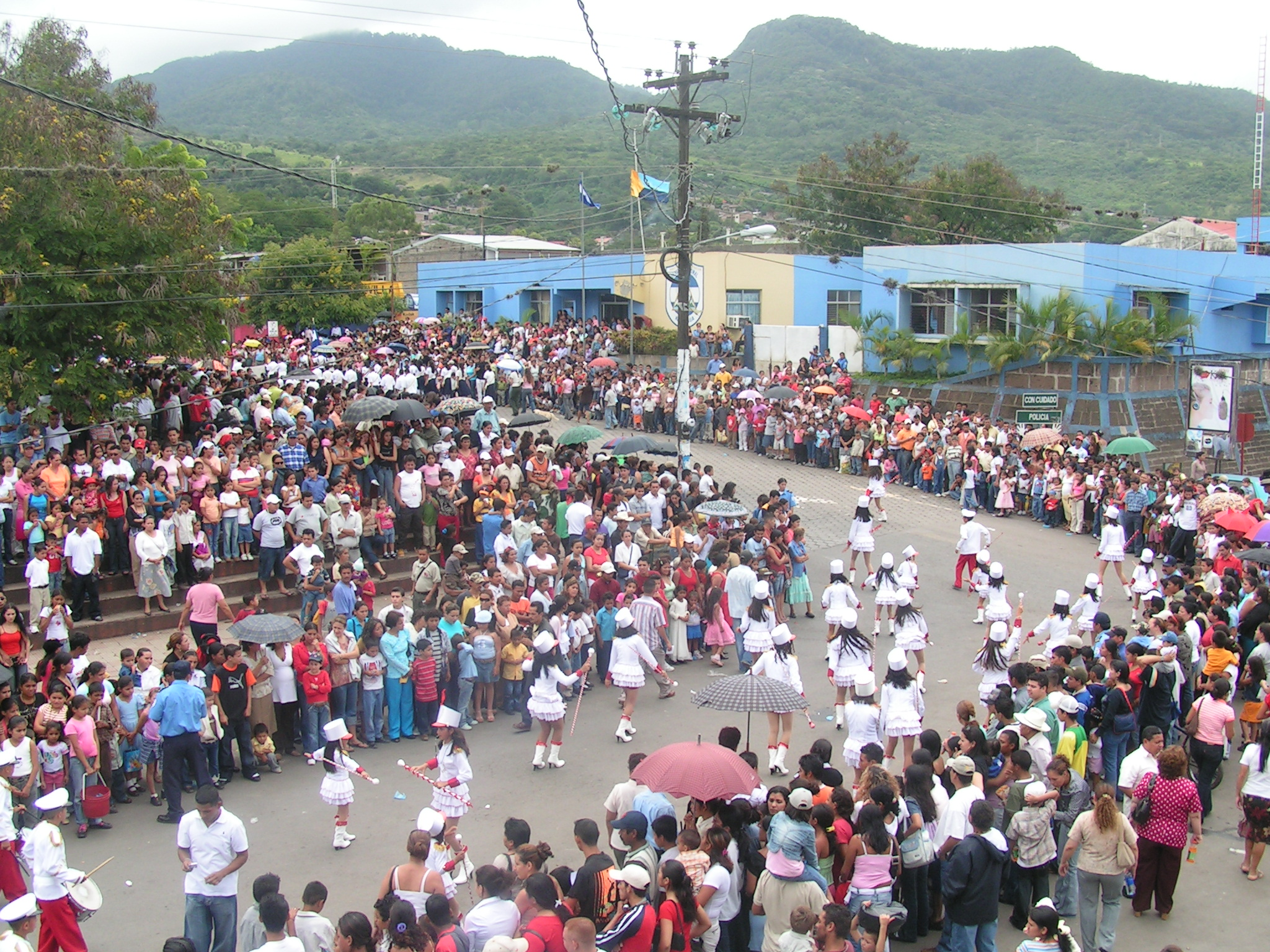
A Nicaragua Independence Day Parade, Matagalpa, 2007.

Music and religious icons find their roots in Iberian culture and African sounds and flavors. The national instrument of Nicaragua is the Marimba which was brought by slaves in colonial times from Sub-Saharan Africa. The west of Nicaragua was colonized by Spain and has a similar culture to other Spanish-speaking American countries. The eastern half of the country, on the other hand, was once a British protectorate, and English is spoken domestically along with Spanish and indigenous languages. Its culture is similar to that of former and present British colonies in the Caribbean, such as Jamaica, Belize, the Cayman Islands, etc.

Recent immigration by Spanish speakers has largely influenced younger generations, and an increasing number of people are either bilingual at home or speak Spanish only. In eastern Nicaragua there is a relatively large population of people of mixed African descent, as well as a smaller Garifuna population.

Due to the African influence throughout the country, there exists a different kind of music. It is the popular dance music called 'Palo de Mayo' or Maypole, which is celebrated during the Maypole Festival, during the month of May. The music is sensual with intense rhythms. The celebration is derived from the British Maypole for May Day celebration, as adapted and transformed by the Afro-Nicaraguans on the Caribbean or Mosquito Coast.

Of the many cultures that were present before European colonization, the Nahua and Oto-mangue peoples who populated the western half of the country have been assimilated into the mainstream culture for the most part, blending into the mestizo population. In the east, however, several Chibcha groups have maintained a distinct identity as well as the preservation of their languages, such as the Rama and the Sumo. The Miskito and Garifuna also have their original languages preserved, in addition to having the ability to usually speak Spanish and English.

== Language ==
Languages of Nicaragua

Language	Speakers
Arabic	400
Chinese	7,000
English	20,334
Garífuna	1,500
Miskito	154,400
Sign language	3,000
Spanish	4,347,000
Sumo	6,700
Rama	24
Creole English	30,000

Source: Ethnologue

Spanish, or Nicañol as Nicaraguan Spanish is sometimes referred to, is spoken by 90% of the country's population. In the Caribbean coast many afro-Nicaraguans and creoles speak English and creole English as their first language. Also in the Caribbean coast, many Indigenous people speak their native languages, such as the Miskito, Sumo, Rama and Garifuna language.

In addition, many ethnic groups in Nicaragua, such as the Chinese Nicaraguans and Palestinian Nicaraguans, have maintained their ancestral languages, which are minority languages, while also speaking Spanish and/or English. These minority languages include Chinese, Arabic, German, and Italian, among others. Nicaragua was home to 3 extinct languages, one of which was never classified. Nicaraguan Sign Language is also of particular interest to linguists.

=== Spanish ===
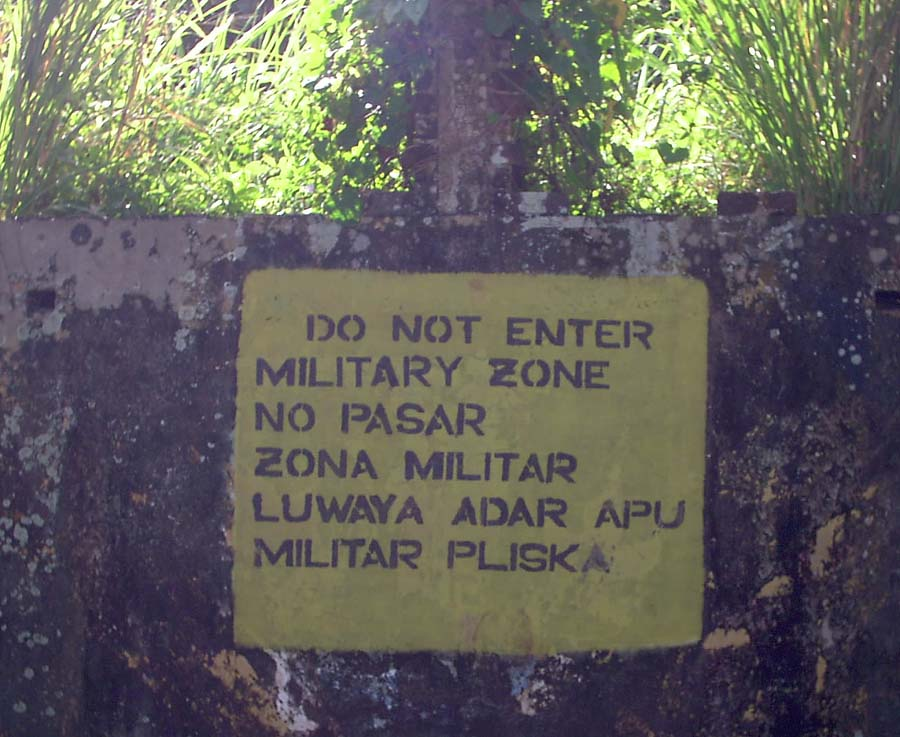
A sign in Bluefields in English (top), Spanish (middle) and Miskito (bottom).

Central American Spanish and Caribbean Spanish is spoken by about 90% of the country's population. In Nicaragua, the voseo form of Spanish is dominant in both speech and publications. The first nation to formally adopt the voseo dialect, Nicaragua is one of two Central American nations (Costa Rica is the other) that use voseo Spanish as its written and spoken form of the language. The usage is also seen in Argentina, Uruguay, Paraguay, and coastal Colombia.

In the Caribbean coast, many Afro-Nicaraguans and creoles speak English and creole English as their first language, but they speak a very fluent Spanish as a second language. The languages in the North and South Atlantic Regions are influenced by English, Dutch, Portuguese, Spanish and French. Many of the indigenous people on the Caribbean coast speak native languages such as the Miskito, Sumo, Rama and Garifuna language. In addition, many ethnic groups in Nicaragua have maintained their ancestral languages, while also speaking Spanish or English; these include Chinese, Arabic, Italian, and German.

Spanish is taught as the principal language. English is taught to students during their high school years and tends to be the national second language. Other languages, particularly Romance languages, can be found sporadically.

=== Phonetics and phonology ===
Some characteristics of Nicaraguan phonology include:

- /s/ at the end of a syllable or before a consonant is pronounced like [h].
- /j/ (/x/) is aspirated; it is soft like the /h/ in English (e.g.: Yahoo).
- There is no confusion between /l/ and /r/, as in the Caribbean.
- /s/, /z/ and in some cases /c/ (as in cerrar) are pronounced as [s]

== Religion ==
Religious affiliation in Nicaragua
Religion	Percentage
Roman Catholic	58.5%
Evangelical	21.6%
Moravian	1.6%
Jehovah's Witnesses	0.9%
None	15.7%
Other^{1}	1.6%
^{1} Includes Buddhism, Islam, Judaism and traditional religion among other religions.
Source: 2005 Nicaraguan Census

Religion is a significant part of the culture of Nicaragua and forms part of the constitution. Religious freedom, which has been guaranteed since 1939, and religious tolerance is promoted by both the Nicaraguan government and the constitution. Bishops are expected to lend their authority to important state occasions, and their pronouncements on national issues are closely followed. They can also be called upon to mediate between contending parties at moments of political crisis.

Although Nicaragua has no official religion it is nominally Roman Catholic. Practicing Roman Catholics are no longer the majority and are declining while evangelical Protestant groups and membership in the Church of Jesus Christ of Latter-Day Saints are growing rapidly have been growing since the 1990s. There are also strong Anglican and Moravian communities on the Caribbean coast, and Christian beliefs are mixed with indigenous and African beliefs brought during colonial times. Although not as widespread as in Cuba, Yoruba beliefs akin to Santeria are widespread.

Roman Catholicism came to Nicaragua in the sixteenth century with the Spanish conquest and remained until 1939 the established faith. Protestantism and other Christian sects came to Nicaragua during the nineteenth century, but only during the twentieth century have Protestant denominations gained large followings in the Caribbean Coast of the country. Popular religion revolves around the saints, who are perceived as intermediaries between human beings and God.

Most localities, from the capital of Managua to small rural communities, honor patron saints selected from the Roman Catholic calendar, with annual fiestas. In many communities, a rich lore has grown up around the celebrations of patron saints, such as Managua's Saint Dominic (Santo Domingo), honored in August with two colorful, often riotous, day-long processions through the city. The high point of Nicaragua's religious calendar for the masses is neither Christmas nor Easter, but La Purísima, a week of festivities in early December dedicated to the Immaculate Conception, during which elaborate altars to the Virgin Mary are constructed in homes and workplaces.

== Music ==
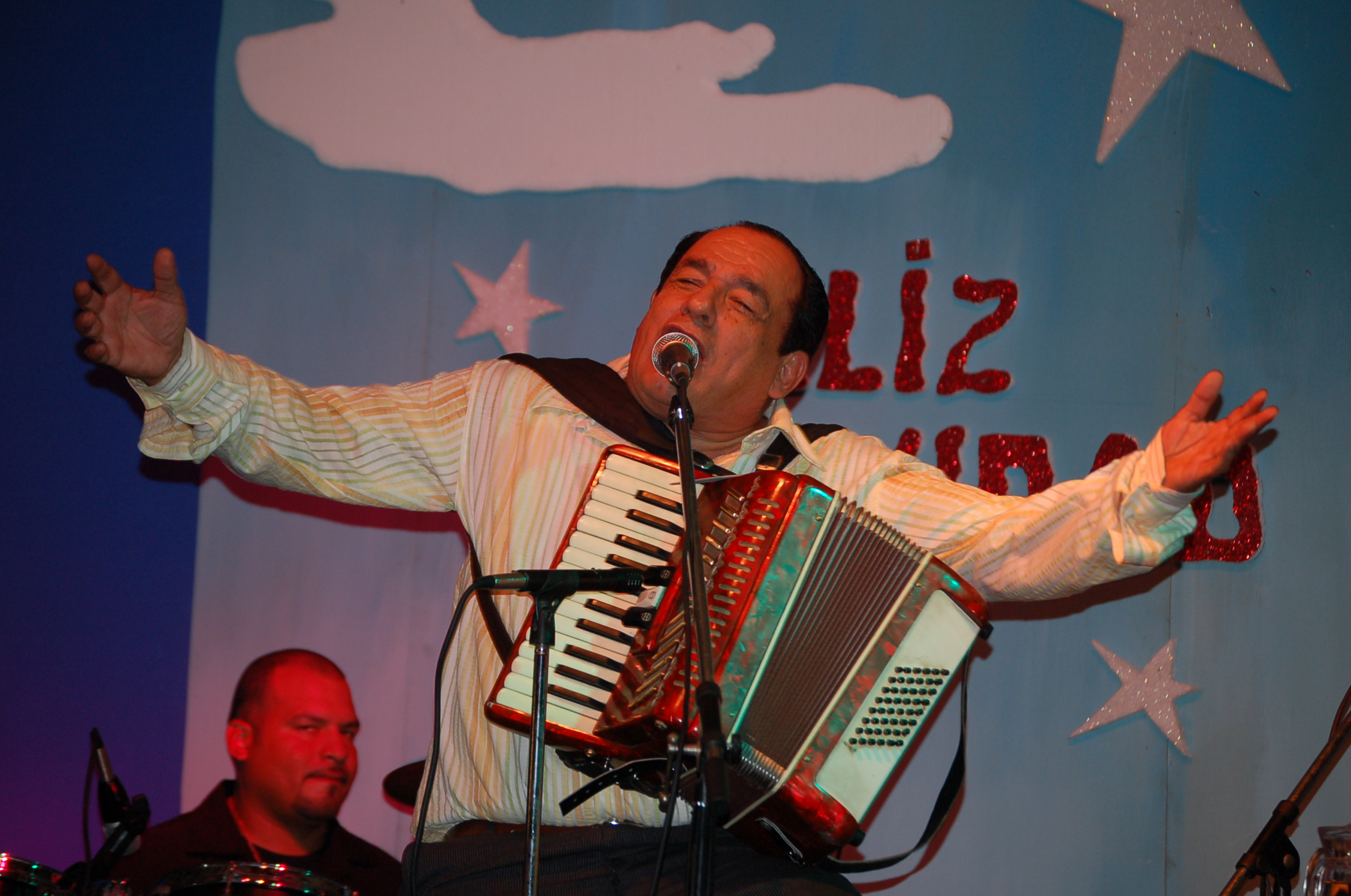
Carlos Mejía Godoy, a prominent Nicaragua musician and composer.

Modern Nicaraguan music of African, indigenous and Spanish influences. Musical instruments include the Marimba which comes from West Africa, which is the representative instrument of other regions of Latin America with strong African roots, such as the Pacific coast of Colombia.

Marimba of Nicaragua is uniquely played by a sitting performer holding the instrument on his knees. He is usually accompanied by a bass fiddle, guitar and Guallatiri (a small guitar like a mandolin). This music is played at social functions as a sort of background music. The marimba is made with hardwood plates, placed over bamboo or metal tubes of varying lengths. It is played with two or four hammers.

Salsa and Timba are popular throughout the country. Nicaragua is the homeland of the salsero Luis Enrique, globally known as "El Principe de la Salsa". Nicaragua has plenty of undiscovered musical talent, however, due to the lack of basic infrastructure, it is impossible for many of these artists to become known. All of the Nicaraguan artists with international reach such as: the Reggae and Dancehall artist Clarence Malcom, the Timba vocalist Cecilia Ferrer as well as Luis Enrique himself had to pave their career abroad. Reggaeton, Plena, Dancehall, Dembow, Reggae and Soca are very popular throughout the country.

The Caribbean coast of Nicaragua is known for a lively, sensual form of dance music that is especially loud and celebrated during the May Palo de Mayo festival. The Garifuna community exists in Nicaragua and is known for its popular music called Punta and Tambor.

== Education ==
Education is free for all Nicaraguans. Elementary education is free and compulsory, however, many children in rural areas are unable to attend due to lack of schools and other reasons. Communities located on the Caribbean coast have access to education in their native languages. The majority of higher education institutions are located in Managua, higher education has financial, organic and administrative autonomy, according to the law. Also, freedom of subjects is recognized.

Nicaragua's higher education consists of 48 universities and 113 colleges and technical institutes which serve student in the areas of electronics, computer systems and sciences, agroforestry, construction and trade-related services. The educational system includes 1 U.S. accredited English-language university, 3 Bilingual university programs, 5 Bilingual secondary schools and dozens of English Language Institutes. In 2005, almost 400,000 (7%) of Nicaraguans held a university degree. 18% of Nicaragua's total budget is invested in primary, secondary and higher education. University level institutions account for 6% of 18%.

When the Sandinistas came to power in 1979, they inherited an educational system that was one of the poorest in Latin America. Under the Somozas, limited spending on education (Anastasio Somoza García himself had said "I don't want educated people, I want oxen.") and generalized poverty, which forced many adolescents into the labor market, constricted educational opportunities for Nicaraguans. A 1980 literacy campaign, using secondary school students, university students as well as teachers as volunteer teachers, reduced the overall illiteracy rate from 50.3% to 12.9% within only five months. The key large scale programs of the Sandinistas included a massive National Literacy Crusade (March–August, 1980), social program, which received international recognition for their gains in literacy, health care, education, childcare, unions, and land reform. In September 1980, UNESCO awarded Nicaragua with the "Nadezhda K. Krupskaya" award for their successful literacy campaign. This was followed by the literacy campaigns of 1982, 1986, 1987, 1995 and 2000, all of which were also awarded by UNESCO.

== Literature ==
Nicaraguan literature can be traced to pre-Columbian times with the myths and oral literature that formed the cosmogonic view of the world that indigenous people had. Some of these stories are still known in Nicaragua. Like many Latin American countries, the Spanish conquerors have had the most effect on both the culture and the literature. Nicaraguan literature has historically been an important source of poetry in the Spanish-speaking world, with internationally renowned contributors such as Rubén Darío who is regarded as the most important literary figure in Nicaragua, referred to as the "Father of Modernism" for leading the modernismo literary movement at the end of the 19th century.

Other literary figures include Ernesto Cardenal, Gioconda Belli, Claribel Alegría and José Coronel Urtecho, Alfredo Alegría Rosales, Carlos Martínez Rivas, Pablo Antonio Cuadra, Manolo Cuadra, Pablo Alberto Cuadra Arguello, Sergio Ramírez among others.

=== El Güegüense ===
El Güegüense is a satirical drama and was the first literary work of post-Columbian Nicaragua. It is regarded as one of Latin America's most distinctive colonial-era expressions and as Nicaragua's signature folkloric masterpiece combining music, dance and theater. El Güegüense is performed during the feast of San Sebastián in Diriamba (Carazo Department) from January 17 to the 27th.

The theatrical play was written by an anonymous author in the 16th century, making it one of the oldest theatrical/dance works of the Western Hemisphere. It was passed down orally for many centuries until it was finally written down and published into a book in 1942.

El Güegüense represents folklore of Nicaragua, therefore, UNESCO proclaimed it a "Masterpiece of the Oral and Intangible Heritage of Humanity" in 2005 making Nicaragua the only country in Central America and one of six in Latin America to have 2 proclaimed masterpieces by UNESCO. The first proclaimed masterpiece was the "Oral traditions and expressions" of the Garifuna.

== Legends ==
Nicaraguans legends are similar to those found in other Latin American countries. Some popular legends include:

- La Mocuana -- The Nicaraguan folkloric legend of La Mocuana is believed to be based on genuine history and it is thought that La Mocuana is the name of the history of a living Native princess. Her father was hospitable to the Spanish conquerors at first but then ordered them to leave. Soon the Spanish forces returned to take over the village and take their gold. The chief of the village had hidden the treasure and his daughter, La Mocuana, was the only other individual who knew its whereabouts. During a battle between the two groups the tribe gained victory. Some time later the son of one of the Spanish soldiers came to live near the village and soon fell in love with La Mocuana. She too fell in love with him and they planned to run away together. She gave him her father's treasure so that they could have something for their lives together. The Spaniard preferred to keep the gold for himself and sealed La Mocuana in a cave, running away with the treasure. La Mocuana escaped through the back of the cave. The heartbroken princess began to wander the woods and was driven mad by the thoughts of betrayal and feelings of guilt. Country people say that her sad figure can be seen on dark nights. She is also said to lure drunkards and philanderers to her cave where they disappear.
- El Cadejo – There is a good white cadejo and an evil black cadejo. Both are spirits that appear at night to travellers. The white cadejo to protect them from harm during their journey, and the black cadejo (sometimes an incarnation of the devil) to kill them. The cadejos usually appear in the form of a large, cow-sized shaggy dog with burning red eyes and a goat's hooves, although in some areas they have more bull-like characteristics. According to the stories, those who have attempted to kill the black cadejo have failed and perished.
- La Cegua – Also called Cihuanaba, Cegua is probably a romanization of the nahuatl "Cihua" which means woman. La Cegua is a witch who resides in the woods. She takes on several facades. At times she appears in a white corn leaf dress with a veil covering her face. It is said that she has long black hair covering over her face. She is also said to wear a Guarumo Tree leaf dress and her voice is made rasping and hollow by plantain leaves covering her teeth. Others say that her face is ghostly and that her eyes stare into her victim's souls. Still another version says that she is believed to have the face of a horse. Nicaraguans also say that she walks through the woods and back roads naked, waiting for her next victim. Men are drawn to her fantastical silhouette. The words she speaks to these men are so horrific that the victim goes insane instantaneously – something from which they never recover. La Cegua is believed to have super-human abilities and is able to walk through solid objects, gravitate above ground and fly at extreme speeds in her efforts to lure men into her trap. To save yourself from such an encounter you should carry mustard seeds and throw them before her. She apparently will stop to try and pick up the magical seeds. As with other myths in Nicaraguan folklore, the tale of La Cegua is believed to ensure that men come straight home after work.
- La Llorona – Sometimes called the Woman in White or the Weeping Woman is the ghost of a woman crying for her dead children. Her appearances are sometimes held to presage death.
- La Novia de Tola ("The bride from Tola") – Apocryphal legend of a maiden who went insane after her fiancé stood her up at the altar. In current usage, to say that someone was "left like the bride from Tola" is a uniquely Nicaraguan idiom meaning that someone was stood up or left "holding the bag". The city of Tola in the department of Rivas, Nicaragua erected a statue in the town square to honor the legendary bride.
- La Carreta Nagua – An old Nicaraguan folk tale about a haunted cart that is driven by Death and pulled by two skeletal oxen. It could supposedly be heard at night because of the sound of chains it made being dragged along the streets. If the "Carreta Nagua" stops at one's home, surely a resident is to die. The old tale is believed to have been established by the indigenous people of Nicaragua, who would be kidnapped by the Spaniards, chained onto ox-driven carts and taken to work the mines. There they would die and not be seen again until their corpses were driven on those same carts to be disposed of. Such carts became a symbol of death and when heard approaching, the indigenous people would flee into the woods.
- La Taconuda – The legend of a woman whose fiancé stood her up at the altar. People say that her ghost walks around the city of Leon Nicaragua searching for her fiancé or other young lonely men. She is called la taconuda for wearing giant heels.

== See also ==
- Museums of Nicaragua
- Public holidays in Nicaragua
- Miss Nicaragua
- Nicaraguan cuisine

General:

- Latin American culture
- Hispanic culture
