= TN8 =

Nicaraguan television network

- Country: Nicaragua

Programming
- Language: Spanish
- Picture format: 480i SDTV

Ownership
- Owner: Televisora Nicaraguense S.A. (Juan Carlos Ortega Murillo)

History
- Launched: 15 July 1956 (first version); 9 December 1992 (second version)

Links
- Website: http://www.tn8.tv/

Availability

Terrestrial
- Analog VHF: Channel 8

Telenica (branded as TN8) is a Nicaraguan terrestrial television channel. The station began as Canal 8, the first television station to broadcast in Nicaragua, which began operations on 15 July 1956. The original station operated under the ownership of President Anastasio Somoza García before merging with Canal 6 in 1962 under Televisión de Nicaragua, S.A.

The Channel 8 license was reactivated in 1992 by journalist Carlos Briceño, who founded Telenica and relaunched the station as a privately operated broadcaster. In 2010, the station was acquired by Juan Carlos Ortega Murillo, son of Nicaraguan president Daniel Ortega.TN8 currently broadcasts a mix of news programs, entertainment programming, and imported television series.

== History ==
=== Early history (1956-1962) ===
Canal 8 was the first television station to operate in Nicaragua, beginning broadcasts on 15 July 1956. The station was owned by President Anastasio Somoza García. It was broadcast from the building of the now-defunct Novedades newspaper, which was also owned by Somoza García.

Equipment was imported, and was operated by technicians and engineers from Radio Managua and the United States. The station's manager was journalist Luis Hidalgo. It broadcast live shows and movies from 6:30 pm to 9 pm, before showing folkloric programming and baseball games. Growth was limited due to the low availability of television sets among the Nicaraguan population.

In 1962, Canal 8 and Canal 6 merged under the name Televisión de Nicaragua, S.A. (Telenica), and began to broadcast with equipment from Canal 6. The station operated under the call sign YNSA-TV. It is unknown when the channel ceased operations under government control.

=== Private channel under Carlos Briceño (1992-2009) ===
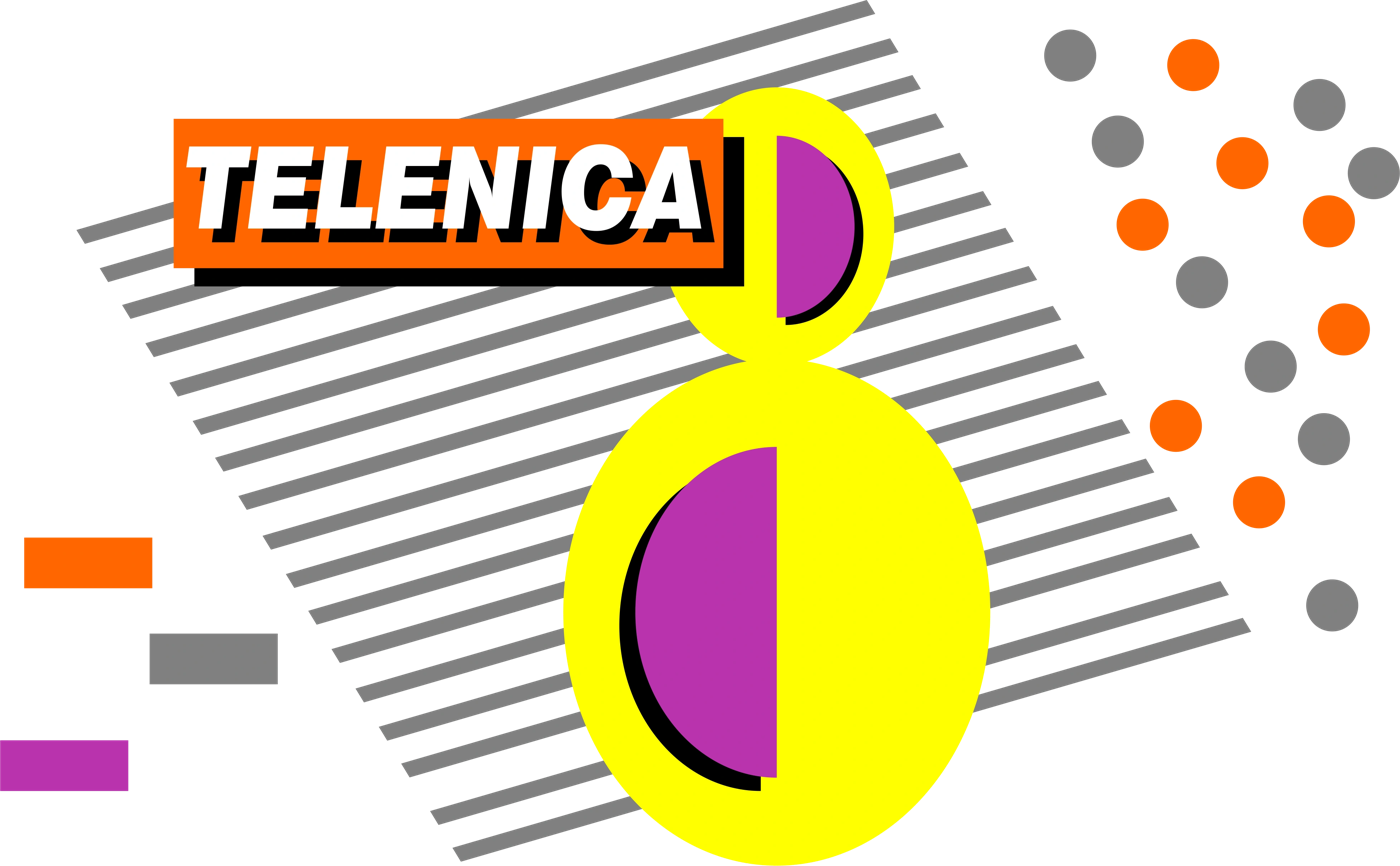
Telenica 8's first logo

In the early 1990s, the state television monopoly previously held by the dissolved Sistema Sandinista de Televisión, which had been divided between Canal 2 and Canal 6, came to an end. The license to operate Canal 8 was reactivated and given to Telenica, founded by journalist Carlos Briceño. Briceño was a former Univisión correspondent in Miami and later worked at Sistema Nacional de Televisión (Canal 6). Telenica was established on 3 February 1992, and Telenica Canal 8 (TN8) began operations on 9 December 1992, though some sources claim that broadcasting began in July of that year.

Initially, the station aimed to provide an alternative to the existing channels. However, the channel operated with limited human resources, prompting it to rely heavily on imported programming when financial resources permitted. Equipment was obtained from bank loans and donations from international aid agencies. In the mid-1990s, TN8 reportedly considered a conversion to an all-news channel.

In early 1994, TN8 broadcast between 3:30 pm and 11 pm. At this time, approximately 15% of programming was news and 10% focused on current affairs. At launch, these categories occupied 53% of the schedule. In 1994, 75% of the programming was international in origin. Like Canal 4, TN8 was unaffiliated to ATELCAP and obtained foreign programming via satellite, without licensing rights from the producers. TN8 also avoided broadcasting telenovelas and TV series. The channel's reach was limited to urban areas in and around Managua.

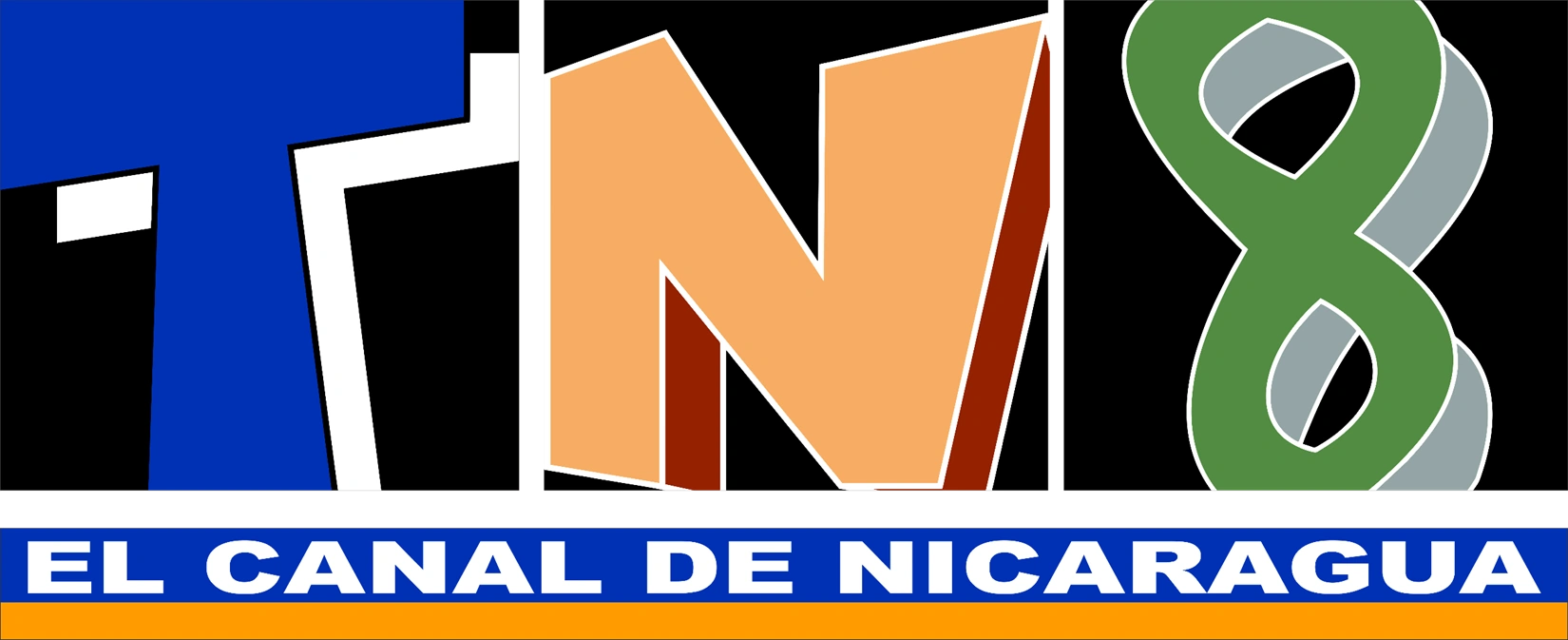
Channel logo in the 2000s

In 2004, it was reported that TN8 had the highest ratings among local television channels, and its newscast Noticiero Independiente had surpassed Canal 2's TVNoticias. In early 2005, Noticiero Independiente surpassed the ratings of Sábado Gigante and the telenovelas broadcast on Canal 2. In December 2006, the channel was added to the JumpTV website, alongside Radio 8 and two other independent channels—100% Noticias and ESTV.

Under Briceño's leadership, its programming was meant for a family audience, concentrating on news, informational programs, sports and commentary, specials, series, and musical shows. In its later years under his administration, TN8 produced an average of 5.5 hours of live news programming per day, or around 121 hours a month. Overall national production averaged 13.5 hours daily, or 297 hours a month. In contrast to other channels focusing on telenovelas and movies, TN8 specialized in news and current affairs programming.

=== Acquisition by Juan Carlos Ortega Murillo (2010-present) ===
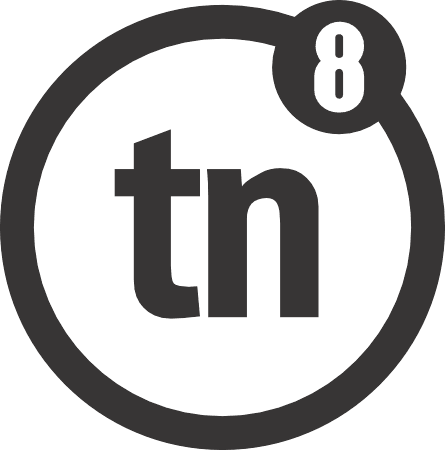
Logo used from 2010 to January 2021. The logo was similar in concept to an old one used by Canal 13 between 2000 and 2005

In late 2009, TN8 was acquired by Juan Carlos Ortega Murillo, son of president Daniel Ortega. The sale was publicly announced in January 2010. It was purchased for a sum of US$9.7 million, relying on funding from Albanisa, a company with mixed shares from Venezuelan and Nicaraguan state-run petrol companies.

Human rights organizations criticized the sale of Telenica, as the presidential family was not transparent about the details of the sale. Negotiations with Albanisa had been underway for several months and were one of several possible options considered for the sale of the channel, including arrangements related to debts the station had accumulated since 2000. On 14 January 2010, Briceño confirmed that the channel would come under administration of Juan Carlos Ortega administration effective 25 January.

The new administration initiated a rebranding process during its first week in control of the channel. One of TN8's main programs under Briceño, Esta Semana, was replaced by Sin Fronteras, hosted by the pro-government presenter William Grigsby. The program included international news reports from Telesur and excerpts of speeches by Daniel Ortega during commercial breaks. Media outlets and commentators expressed concern about the future direction of the channel, including speculation about a possible rebranding as ALBA-TV, and questions regarding reports that a majority stake was linked to Venezuelan financing. Sin Fronteras was cancelled on 11 February 2010, as the new ownership began changing TN8's format from a predominantly news-focused service to an entertainment channel with telenovelas and movies.

On 6 September 2010, the newscasts that existed under the Briceño administration—Noticiero 24 Horas and Noticiero Independiente— were replaced by a new program, Crónica TN8, after changes were made to align its content with the Sandinista National Liberation Front (FSLN). On 18 September, Lado Oscuro moved to TN8 from CDNN 23.

Following the programming changes, the channel increased its purchase of imported television series and movies, primarily from the United States and Japan. It made deals with international production companies such as Warner Bros., 20th Century Fox, Viacom, Toei Animation, and other independent production companies. This included a volume agreement with Viacom to provide content for a children's programming slot, Hora Nick. In 2015, TN8 Director of Programming Álvaro Rocha stated that the channel's programming was 20% original and 80% foreign.

According to a 2020 investigation by Reuters, TN8 was owned by Yadira Leets Marín, the wife of Rafael Ortega Murillo, a son of Daniel Ortega and owner of state-run radio station La Nueva Radio Ya. The report states that it is unknown whether Leets was involved in the 2010 purchase of the channel.

A spin-off of Crónica TN8, titled Crónica TN8 Internacionales, premiered on 29 September 2021 at 5:00 pm, replacing the sitcoms previously broadcast in that time slot. This change created an extended block of news programs, as Crónica TN8 Internacionales precedes 8 Deportivo and the main edition of Crónica TN8. Longtime TN8 presenter Karleydi Zelendón left the channel in 2023 and joined the editorial team of Canal 4.

== Programming ==
Examples of programming on TN8 include:

- Crónica TN8 (news)
- Crónica TN8 Internacionales (world news)
- Estudio TN8 (analysis)
- 8 Deportivo (sports news)
- Rebeldes (weekend afternoon program for the youth)
- El Lobby (video games and related topics)
- Hora Nick (kids)
- Hogar y Estilo
- International feature films
- E-sports tournaments

== La Rock 22 ==
Juan Carlos Ortega launched UHF Channel 22 on 23 December 2015. The station was assigned to Difuso Comunicaciones, another company under his control. On 17 July 2020, the channel was sanctioned by the United States Department of Treasury. Following sanctions, advertising on the channel stopped.

At the time the sanctions were imposed, much of the channel's programming consisted of US imports. Ortega subsequently renamed the station Rock FM — after the radio station of the same name— and switched its programming to predominantly rock music videos, reportedly to evade the sanctions.

On 29 July 2020, the channel was taken off the air. At an unspecified later date, it resumed broadcasting under its current name, La Rock 22. The station, alongside TN8, has promoted events like Rock City (2021) with support from the government platform Nicaragua Emprende.

== Controversies ==
=== Zeta Gas affair ===
In July 1998, Mexican oil company Zeta Gas filed a lawsuit against the channel after it aired a 60 Minutes report concerning alleged ties between Zeta Gas and drug traffickers.

=== Under the Juan Carlos administration ===
In September 2020, Juan Carlos Ortega Murillo commented on Twitter about negotiations that had taken place in 2011 to acquire the anime franchises Dragon Ball and Saint Seiya for the channel. According to Ortega, Toei Animation offered TN8 first-run prices, but he alleged that Canal 12 had previously broadcast the series without paying for their rights.
