= Nicaraguan diaspora =

Emigrants from Nicaragua

The 1980s were the backdrop to a civil war which saw conflict destroy the nation of Nicaragua, and the lives of 50,000+ civilians in the process. The multicultural country of Nicaragua experienced an excessive outpouring of citizens who fled the nation for their own security. Although many Nicaraguans live in Spain, Mexico, Panama and El Salvador, the majority of Nicaraguans living abroad are in Costa Rica and the United States. Nicaragua has the second largest number in Central America (after El Salvador) of people living abroad, almost 1,200,000.

According to the Pew Hispanic Center, in 2007 there were 306,438 Nicaraguans in the United States. That represents the fourth greatest Central American community in the U.S. Nicaraguans are the largest Central American Community in Florida (esp. in Miami-Dade County) and the third largest in California (i.e. San Francisco and Los Angeles).

According to the 2000 Census, there were 226,374 Nicaraguans in Costa Rica. However, this number is believed to be higher because there were thousands of undocumented immigrants at that time.

An effort is being made by the Academia de Genealogía de la Diáspora Nicaragüense by collecting and publishing all the family relations of Nicaraguans living abroad and their connections to their roots in the country.

Nicaraguans living abroad are also found in smaller numbers in Europe including the countries of France, Germany, Italy, Norway, Sweden and the UK; Australia and New Zealand; Canada, Brazil and Argentina; and Japan. Usually the Nicaraguans arrived in those countries fleeing from political oppression and economic conditions.

It's difficult to estimate the number of Nicaraguans living abroad because a substantial amount are living in host countries illegally. The table shows current statistics for certain countries:

Country	Count
Costa Rica	350,854
United States	255,008
Spain	42,784 – 69,168 (2022 according to INE)
Panama	15,517
Canada	10,627
Guatemala	9,211
El Salvador	7,956
Honduras	7,943
Mexico	4,303
Venezuela	1,927
Germany	1,685
Italy	1,381 – 775 (2022 according to ISTAT)
Nicaraguans living abroad	At least 718,154

== Diaspora of Nicaragua - California ==
"The Diaspora of Nicaragua - California" was founded in San Francisco to help to integrate the Nicaraguan community. The purpose of the organization is to help all Nicaraguans living abroad come together; develop plans and goals to help to grow the community; share acknowledgements to help each other to grow as individuals and as business owners; help to meet Nicaraguan business owner in order to use their goods and services; organize Nicaraguans in each city and state of the country; promote the right to vote from any country; promote the human rights, peace, equality, social justice and the democracy.
