= Palestinian Nicaraguan =

Palestinian Nicaraguan Palestino-nicaragüense فلسطينيو نيكاراغوا (Palestine) (Nicaragua)
Total population
- unknown

Regions with significant populations
- Managua, Granada, Masaya

Languages
- Spanish, Palestinian Arabic

Religion
- Christianity, Sunni Islam, Shia Islam

Related ethnic groups
- Arab Nicaraguan

Palestinian Nicaraguans (Spanish: palestino-nicaragüense) (Arabic: فلسطينيو نيكاراغوا) are Nicaraguans of Palestinian ancestry who were born in or have immigrated to Nicaragua. They are part of the ethnic Arab diaspora.

== History ==
At different points during the 1890s to the 1940s Nicaragua, and many other Latin American countries, established laws or issued ordinances that restricted the entry of Arabs, forbade the stay of Arabs already present in the country and curtailed the expansion of their commercial activities.

Although the exact number of Palestinians is not available, Guzmán writes "it is possible that from the end of the nineteenth century until 1917, when the Ottoman Empire entered its final decline, during World War I, 40 Palestinian families arrived in Nicaragua". By 2000 it was estimated that there were 500 families of Palestine Arabs and Palestinian descendants in Nicaragua. The Palestinians that arrived in Nicaragua were mostly Christians and a small number of Muslims, the majority of which came from rural villages near Ramallah, Jerusalem, Beit Jala and Bethlehem.

== Culture and lifestyle ==
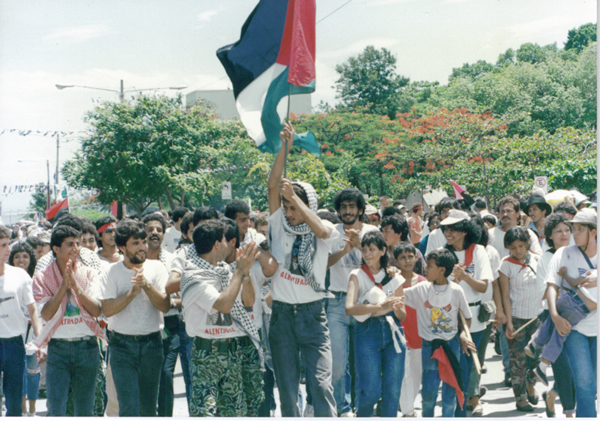
Palestinians celebrating the 10th anniversary of the Nicaraguan revolution in Managua waving Palestine and Sandinista flags.

When the Palestinians arrived in Nicaragua, many came from rural areas and had experience with agricultural work which most continued doing, however, not many were able to buy land. The few Palestinians that managed to buy land for agriculture managed to do so mainly in the Sabana Grande area of the department of Nueva Segovia in northern Nicaragua. Despite the few people who managed to buy land many Palestinians immersed themselves in commerce. They received great profits after founding stores in cities such as Managua, Granada and Masaya, where the majority of which decided to settle. The stores founded by Palestinian immigrants varied from clothing to food stores, some of the more successful stores they founded were Tienda París Loundres, Almacén Dajer, La Media Luna among others.

The Palestinians in Nicaragua tried to attract non-Palestinian Arabs by founding the Club Árabe (Arab Club) in 1958, and although they managed to get Syrians and Lebanese to join, 80% of the members were Palestinian.
