= David Johnson =

David, Dave or Davey Johnson may refer to:

== Academics ==
- David Alan Johnson (born 1952), American philosopher
- David E. Johnson (born 1946), American linguist
- David H. Johnson (1912–1996) American zoologist
- David K. Johnson (born 1962), American historian
- David Kyle Johnson (born 1977), professor of philosophy
- David Orme-Johnson (born 1941), professor of psychology
- David S. Johnson (1945–2016), American computer scientist
- David W. Johnson (scholar) (born 1940), American professor of educational psychology
- David Bancroft Johnson (1856–1928), founder and president of Winthrop University
- David Johnson (nephrologist) (born 1964), Australian kidney specialist

== Arts and music ==
- C. David Johnson (born 1955), Canadian actor
- Dave Johnson (comics), American comic book artist
- Dave Johnson (record producer), American music producer
- David C. Johnson (1940–2021), American composer, flutist, and performer of live-electronic music
- David Earle Johnson (1938–1998), American jazz percussionist, composer, and producer
- David Johnson, real name of World Famous Bushman, American street performer in San Francisco, California
- David Johnson (American artist) (1827–1908), American painter
- David Johnson (photographer) (1926–2024), American photographer
- David Johnson (Scottish composer) (1942–2009), Scottish composer
- David Leslie Johnson (born 1942), American screenwriter of cinema and television
- David N. Johnson (1922–1987), American composer, organist, and professor
- David Johnson (dancer) (1961–2016)

== Broadcasters ==
- Dave Johnson (announcer) (born 1941), American sportscaster known for his horse racing announcing
- Dave Johnson (sportscaster), radio sportscaster and play-by-play voice of D.C. United (MLS) and Washington Wizards (NBA)

== Business and law ==
- David Johnson (company director) (1932–2016), Australian-born CEO of Campbell Soup
- David Johnson (Michigan jurist) (1809–1886), American jurist and legislator
- David G. Johnson (born 1956), lawyer and producer
- David R. Johnson, lawyer specializing in computer communications

== Diplomacy and politics ==
- David Johnson (Canadian politician) (born 1945), Canadian politician
- David Johnson (governor) (1782–1855), American politician, governor of South Carolina, 1846–1848
- David Johnson (Iowa politician) (born 1950), American politician, Iowa State Senator
- David Johnson (Ohio politician), member of the Ohio House of Representatives from 1975 to 1976 and 1979 to 1994
- David Johnson (South Dakota politician) (born 1960), member of the South Dakota Senate 2021-present, member of the South Dakota House of Representatives from 2017 to 2021
- David Moffat Johnson (1902–1973), Canadian ambassador to Ireland in 1949
- David T. Johnson, American diplomat
- David W. Johnson (politician), member of the 111th Ohio General Assembly in 1975
- David Johnson (Arkansas politician), American politician in Arkansas
- David Johnson (Jersey politician)

== Sports ==
=== American football ===
- David Johnson (quarterback) (born 1986), American college football quarterback
- David Johnson (tight end) (born 1987), American football tight end
- David Johnson (running back) (born 1991), American football player

=== Association football ===
- David Johnson (footballer, born 1951) (1951–2022), English international footballer (Ipswich/Liverpool)
- David Johnson (footballer, born 1970), English footballer
- David Johnson (footballer, born 1976), Jamaican footballer
- David Johnson (soccer, born 1984), American soccer player

=== Baseball ===
- Davey Johnson (1943–2025), Major League Baseball player, 1965–1978, and manager
- Dave Johnson (1970s pitcher) (born 1948), Major League Baseball pitcher, 1974–1978
- Dave Johnson (1980s–1990s pitcher) (born 1959), Major League Baseball pitcher, 1987–1993
- Dave "Slim" Johnson, American Negro league baseball player of the 1910s

=== Track and field ===
- David Johnson (Canadian runner) (1902–1973), Canadian athlete (distance runner) in the 1924 Olympics
- David Johnson (triple jumper) (born 1953), English triple jumper
- David Johnson (sprinter) (born 1931), Australian sprinter
- Dave Johnson (decathlete) (born 1963), American decathlete and 1992 Olympic bronze medalist

=== Water sports ===
- David Johnson (swimmer) (born 1947), American freestyle swimmer at the 1968 Summer Olympics
- Dave Johnson (swim coach) (born 1951), head coach of Swimming Canada from 1993 to 2004
- David Johnson (rower) (born 1960), Canadian who competed in rowing at the 1984 Summer Olympics

=== Other sports ===
- David Johnson (Australian rules footballer) (born 1981), Australian-rules footballer
- David Johnson (cricketer, born 1944), English cricketer
- David Johnson (cricketer, born 1971), Indian cricketer for India and Karnataka state
- David Johnson (basketball) (born 2001), American basketball player
- Dave Johnson (basketball) (born 1970), American former basketball player
- David Johnson (racehorse owner) (1940s–2013), owner of 2008 Grand National winner Comply or Die
- David Johnson (sport shooter) (born 1964), American Olympic shooter
- David Johnson (tennis) (born 1969), Australian Paralympian in wheelchair tennis

== Other fields ==
- Dave Johnson, contestant on Survivor: The Amazon (2003)
- David Dewayne Johnson (1963–2000), American criminal, executed for murder in Arkansas
- David Elliot Johnson (1933–1995), Episcopal bishop in the US, Bishop of Massachusetts
- David Johnson (born c. 1947), American convict, one of the San Quentin Six
- David Johnson, editor of Johnson's Russia List, an email newsletter containing Russia-related news and analysis

== See also ==
- David Johnston
