= David Johnston =

David or Dave Johnston may refer to:

== Politics ==
- David Johnston (governor general) (born 1941), governor general of Canada
- David Johnston (Australian politician) (born 1956), Australian senator and defence minister
- David Johnston (British politician) (born 1981), British politician
- David Emmons Johnston (1845–1917), U.S. congressman
- David Russell Johnston (1932–2008), Scottish politician

== Sports ==
- David Johnston (Australian footballer) (born 1969), former Australian rules footballer
- Davie Johnston (footballer, born 1942) (1942–2004), Scottish footballer, played for Heart of Midlothian FC and Aberdeen FC
- Davie Johnston (footballer, born 1948), Scottish footballer, played for Dundee FC
- David Johnston (rugby union, born 1958), Scottish rugby player and coach, also played football for Heart of Midlothian FC
- David Johnston (English cricketer) (born 1943), former English cricketer
- David Johnston (South Australia cricketer) (born 1954), Australian cricketer
- David Johnston (New South Wales cricketer) (born 1955), Australian cricketer
- David Johnston (rugby union, born 1994), Irish rugby player
- D. T. Johnston (1889–1953), Australian sportsman and local politician
- David Johnston (swimmer) (born 2001), American swimmer

== Others ==
- David Johnston (musician), American blues and roots musician
- David Johnston (minister) (1734–1824), Church of Scotland minister of Leith
- Dave Johnston (musician), American banjo player for Yonder Mountain String Band
- Dave Johnston (police officer), head of the Homicide and Serious Crime Command for the Metropolitan Police (United Kingdom)
- David Johnston (newsreader) (born 1941), former Australian newsreader
- David A. Johnston (1949–1980), volcanologist killed in the 1980 eruption of Mount St. Helens
- David Cay Johnston (born 1948), investigative journalist
- David Claypoole Johnston (1799–1865), American cartoonist, printmaker, painter and actor
- David E. Johnston, British classical archaeologist and historian
- David Johnston (admiral) (born 1962), senior officer in the Royal Australian Navy
- David Eric Lothian Johnston (born 1961), Scottish legal expert
- David Johnston (merchant) (1724–1809), American merchant and politician
- David Jhave Johnston, Canadian poet, videographer, and motion graphics artist
- David Johnston (soldier) (1838–1931) American soldier and recipient of the Medal of Honor

== See also ==
- David Johnson (disambiguation)
- Dave Johnston Coal Plant in Wyoming, U.S.
