= Model-theoretic grammar =

Concept in linguistics

Model-theoretic grammars, also known as constraint-based grammars, contrast with generative grammars in the way they define sets of sentences: they state constraints on syntactic structure rather than providing operations for generating syntactic objects. A generative grammar provides a set of operations such as rewriting, insertion, deletion, movement, or combination, and is interpreted as a definition of the set of all and only the objects that these operations are capable of producing through iterative application. A model-theoretic grammar simply states a set of conditions that an object must meet, and can be regarded as defining the set of all and only the structures of a certain sort that satisfy all of the constraints. The approach applies the mathematical techniques of model theory to the task of syntactic description: a grammar is a theory in the logician's sense (a consistent set of statements) and the well-formed structures are the models that satisfy the theory.

== History ==
David E. Johnson and Paul M. Postal introduced the idea of model-theoretic syntax in their 1980 book Arc Pair Grammar.

== Examples of model-theoretic grammars ==
The following is a sample of grammars falling under the model-theoretic umbrella:

- the non-procedural variant of Transformational grammar (TG) of George Lakoff, that formulates constraints on potential tree sequences
- Johnson and Postal's formalization of Relational grammar (RG) (1980), Generalized phrase structure grammar (GPSG) in the variants developed by Gazdar et al. (1988), Blackburn et al. (1993) and Rogers (1997)
- Lexical functional grammar (LFG) in the formalization of Ronald Kaplan (1995)
- Head-driven phrase structure grammar (HPSG) in the formalization of King (1999)
- Constraint Handling Rules (CHR) grammars
- The implicit model underlying The Cambridge Grammar of the English Language

== Strengths ==
One benefit of model-theoretic grammars over generative grammars is that they allow for gradience in grammaticality. A structure may deviate only slightly from a theory or it may be highly deviant. Generative grammars, in contrast, "entail a sharp boundary between the perfect and the nonexistent, and do not even permit gradience in ungrammaticality to be represented."
