= Miskito grammar =

Grammar of the Miskito language

The Miskito language, the language of the Miskito people of the Atlantic coast of Nicaragua and Honduras, is a member of the Misumalpan language family and also a strongly Germanic-influenced language. Miskito is as widely spoken in Honduras and Nicaragua as Spanish, it is also an official language in the Atlantic region of these countries. With more than 8 million speakers, Miskito has positioned in the second place in both countries after Spanish. Miskito is not only spoken in Central America, but in Europe (United Kingdom, Germany, Sweden, Netherlands, Spain, Switzerland, France and Italy), the USA, Canada and in many other Latin American countries. Miskito used to be a royal state language in the 16th to 19th dynasties of the Miskito Kingdom.

== Noun phrase ==
=== Determiners and quantifiers ===
Common determiners and quantifiers
Some determiners			Some quantifiers	
ba definite article; na proximal definite article; kum indefinite article; kumkum plural indefinite article	naha 'this'; baha 'that'; naura 'close by'; bukra 'over there'	ani 'which'; dia 'what'	kumkum 'some'; uya, ailal, manis 'many'; wala 'other'; sut 'all'; an 'how many'	kumi, wan 'one'; wal, tu 'two'; yumhpa, tri 'three'; walhwal, for 'four'; matsip, faip 'five'

The demonstratives naha, baha, naura, bukra and the interrogative determiners ani and dia precede the noun they determine and require the ligature (see below).

- naha araska 'this horse'
- baha araska 'that horse'
- ani araska? 'which horse?'

The indefinite article and most quantifiers follow the noun and do not require a ligature.

- aras kum 'one horse, a horse'
- aras kumkum 'some horses'
- aras an? 'how many horses?'
- aras yumhpa 'three horses'

The general article ba and the proximal article na stand at the end of the noun phrase and require no ligature. The proximal article expresses proximity.

- aras ba 'the horse'
- utla na 'the house'
- papiki atkan araska na 'this horse that my father bought'

Optionally the article may be combined with other determiners or quantifiers, and with the ligature (which seems to convey a greater degree of definiteness).

- naha araska na 'this horse'
- baha araska ba 'that horse'
- aras kum ba 'there is one horse'
- araska ba 'the horse in question, the horse which...'

The determiners are used sometimes with pronouns to emphasize the subject in question.

- Witin ba patkira sa. 'He is guilty.'

=== Ligature ===
Ligature is a term (with precedents in other languages) for describing a grammatical feature of Miskito traditionally referred to with less accuracy in the Miskito context as 'construct'. A ligature is a morpheme (often -ka) which occurs when a noun is linked to some other element in the noun phrase. In Miskito, most of the elements that require the presence of ligature are ones that precede the head noun:

Elements triggering linking
Type	Example
Determiners	baha araska 'that horse'
Adjectives	araska karna ba 'the horse is strong'
Dependent possessors	Johan araska 'Johan's horse'
Relative clauses	Kati atkan araska ba 'the horse that Kati bought'

Ligature takes a variety of forms:

Forms of ligature
Form	Examples
-ka suffix	aras 'horse' → araska; kabu 'sea' → kabuka; piuta 'snake' → piutka
-ika suffix	kipla 'rock' → kiplika
-ya suffix	tasba 'land' → tasbaya; tala 'blood' → talia
-a- INFIX	silak 'needle' → sialaka (< *si-a-laka); utla 'house' → watla (< *w-a-tla)
-ka suffix + -a- INFIX	duri 'boat' → duarka (< *du-a-r-ka)
-ya suffix + -a- INFIX	sula 'deer' → sualia (< *su-a-l-ia)
irregular	plun 'food' → pata; diara 'thing' → dukia

Some nouns take no ligature morpheme; these mostly denote parts of the body (e.g. bila 'mouth', napa 'tooth', kakma 'nose') or kinship (e.g. lakra 'opposite-sex sibling'), although there is only an imperfect correlation between membership of this morphological class and semantic inalienability (see also relationals below).

=== Possession ===
A noun phrase possessor precedes the possessed noun with ligature (unless inalienable, see above).

- Mark araska 'Mark's horse'
- Mark napa 'Mark's tooth'

The possessor may be a personal pronoun if it is emphasized.

- yang araski 'my horse'
- mannan nampa 'your (pl.) tooth'

Such pronouns may be omitted. In either case, personal possessors are grammaticalized as morphological indices.

- araski 'my/our (exc.) horse'
- nampa 'your (sg./pl.) tooth'

Possessive indices
	preposed particle	suffix form	infix form	
1		-i	-i-	'my, our (exc.)'
2		-m	-m-	'your (sg./pl.)'
3	ai			'his, her, its, their'
1+2	wan			'our (inc.)'

Ai and wan precede the noun, with ligature unless inalienable.

(aras→araska)

(bila)

- ai araska 'his... horse'
- ai bila 'his mouth'
- wan araska 'our (inc.) horse'
- wan bila 'our (inc.) mouth'

The indices for first or second person are generally suffixed to the -ka or -ya ligature when either is present (with loss of final -a before -i):

(aras→araska)

(tasba→tasbaya)

- araski 'my... horse'
- tasbayi 'my land'
- araskam 'your horse'
- tasbayam 'your land'

Otherwise they are mostly infixed after the infixed ligature -a-:

(utla→watla:)

(sula→sualia:)

- waitla 'my house'
- suailia 'my deer'
- wamtla 'your house'
- suamlia 'your deer'

Nouns of the inalienable class (with no ligature) take the same possessive indices, which may again be either suffixed:

(bila)

- bili 'my/our (exc.) mouth'
- bilam 'your mouth'

...or infixed:

(napa)

- naipa 'my/our (exc.) tooth'
- nampa 'your tooth'

Some nouns infix in the first person but suffix in the second, and there are some other miscellaneous irregularities.

(kakma)

(duri→duarka)

- kaikma 'my/our (exc.) nose'
- duairka 'my/our (exc.) boat'
- kangmkma 'your nose'
- duarmka 'your boat'

=== The plural ===
Number is not a morphological category in Miskito. Plural number is indicated in noun phrases by the particle nani or -nan placed after the noun or pronoun. Nani is optional with numerals.

- yang nani or yangnan 'we (exc.)'
- baha nani or bahanan 'those'
- naha watla nani na or naha watlanan na 'these houses'
- uplika karna nani ba or upla karnanan ba 'the strong people'
- aras (nani) yumhpa 'three horses'

=== Adjectives ===
Adjectives used attributively usually follow the head noun and do not require a ligature:

but some (including past participles) precede it, in which case the noun, unless inalienable, takes its ligature:

- aras pihni ba 'the white horse'
- aras karna ba 'the strong horse'
- upla pruannan ba 'dead people'

=== Pronouns and adverbs ===
The personal pronouns differentiate three persons and also have an exclusive/inclusive distinction in the first person plural. The general plural morpheme nani or -nan is added to form plurals (except with yawan). Use of these pronouns is optional when person is indexed in the possessed form, relational or verb group.

Personal pronouns
Singular	Plural
yang 'I/me' man 'you' witin (neutral) 'he/him, she/her, it'	yang nani or yangnan 'we/us (exclusive)' man nani or mannan 'you' witin nani or witinnan 'they/them' yawan 'we/us (inclusive)'

The pronouns are not case-specific, and may, under comparable conditions, be marked by the same postpositions as other noun phrases.

Other pronouns and deictic adverbs
	Pronouns	Place adverbs	Other adverbs
Demonstrative	naha 'this'; baha 'that'	nahara, naura 'here'; bahara, bukra 'there'	naku, nan 'like this'; baku, ban 'like that, so'; mahka, nanara, nawas 'now'; bara 'then'
Interrogative	ya? 'who?'; dia? 'what?'; dikia? 'what? (construct)'; ani? 'which one?'	anira? 'where?'	nahki? 'how?'; ahkia? 'when?'
Negative polarity	diara kumsin 'anything'; upla kumsin 'anybody'; kumsin 'any' (det.)	plis kumsin 'anywhere'	piu kumsin 'ever'

=== Postpositions ===
Dative complements are marked by the multi-purpose enclitic postposition ra, which is also a locative (doing duty for both dative and spatial meanings of English 'to', as well as 'in'). The same marker is also often used with direct objects.

- Locative ra: Nikaragua ra auna. 'I am going to Nicaragua.' Honduras ra iwisna. 'I live in Honduras.'
- Dative ra: Yang Joly ra buk kum yabri. 'I gave Joly a book.' "I Joly-ra book one gave.'
- Accusative ra: Yang Joly ra kaikri. 'I saw Joly.' "I Joly-ra saw."

This and other postpositions are placed after the last element in a noun phrase, e.g.

- aras ra 'to the horse'
- aras pihni ra 'to the white horse'
- aras pihni kum ra 'to a white horse'

Some postpositions
ra (enclitic)	'to, in, at...'	(see above)
kat wina	'to, as far as' 'from'	Bilwi wina Lempira kat 'from Bilwi to Lempira'; utla wina 'out of the house'
wal	'with (general)'	Piter tuktika ba wal 'with Piter's child'; rais bins wal 'rice with beans'; baha lalahka wal 'with that money'
ni	'with (instrumental)'	naha lalahka ni 'with this money'; bip taya ni '(made) of leather ("cow skin")'

=== Relationals ===
Relationals are quasi-nouns expressing some relationship (often spatial) to their possessor complement. Many of the relationals perceivably originate in locatives (in -ra) of nouns designating parts of the body employed metaphorically to convey spatial or other relations.

For example, utla bilara literally means 'in the mouth of the house'.

Relationals index pronominal complements in the same way as nouns index their possessors.

- utla bila-ra 'inside the house'
- ai bila-ra 'inside him/her/them'
- (yang) bili-ra 'inside me'
- (man) bilam-ra 'inside you'

Some examples of relationals in use:

- Witin yang ninira balan. 'He came behind me.'
- Man nani kainamra Bilwi ra wamna. 'I will go to Bilwi before you (pl.).'
- Witin dur lamara takaskan. 'He paused near the door.'
- Naha batilka utla bilara mangkaisna. 'I will put this bottle inside the house.'
- Upla aihkika witin dukiara but munan. 'Most people voted for him.'

Some relationals
Spatial relations	Other relations
bila-ra 'in, inside'; pura(-ra) 'on, on top of'; mununhta-ra 'under'; kaina-ra 'in front of'; nina-ra 'behind'; tila-ra 'between, among'; lama-ra 'near'	dukia-ra 'for, about'; mapa-ra 'for, against, as regards'; watlika-ra 'instead of'; tawan 'because of'

== Verbal groups ==
=== Overview ===
Verbs are conventionally cited with the infinitive suffix -aia. The stem of many such verbs (obtained by subtracting the infinitive ending) are monosyllabic (bal-, dim-, tak-, dauk-, kaik-, bri-, wi-, pi- etc.); a few are non-syllabic (e.g. w- 'go').

- balaia 'come'
- waia 'go'
- dimaia 'go in'
- takaia 'go out'
- daukaia 'make'
- munaia 'do'
- briaia 'have'
- kaikaia 'see'
- aisaia 'speak'
- wiaia 'tell'
- walaia 'hear'
- piaia 'eat'
- yapaia 'sleep'

Finite forms include several tenses and moods, in each of which the person (but not number) of the subject is marked by suffixes. The tenses themselves have characteristic suffixes which combine with the subject-indexing suffixes.

In addition to synthetic (simple) tenses, there is also a considerable range of periphrastic (compound) tenses. These are formed with a non-finite form of the main verb followed by an auxiliary verb.

Some of the synthetic tenses represent original periphrastic tense structures that have become welded into single words. This helps to explain why there are two different forms each in the present, past and future. (The sample verb used is pulaia 'play', stem pul-, given here in the third-person form of each tense.)

I
II

Present tenses:

puluya

pulisa

Past tenses:

pulata

pulan

Future tenses:

pulaisa

pulbia

In addition to a subject index which form part of a verb's suffix, for transitive verbs the verb group includes an object index in the form of a preverbal particle marking the person (but not the number) of the object. The subject markers vary somewhat according to the tense, but the most usual forms are shown in the following table (see below for more details).

Subject and object indices
Person	Subject suffixes	Object particles
1	-na	ai
2	-ma	mai
3	-a	—
1+2	-a	wan

Presence of the personal pronouns (yang, man, witin, yawan, yang nani...) referring to the indexed subject or object is optional (i.e. there is pro-drop).

- Mai kaikisna. 'I see you.'

The absence of an object index preceding a transitive verb signals a third person object:

- Kaikisna. 'I see him/her/it/them'
- Waitla kaikisna. 'I see my house.'

Other participant roles may be expressed by personal pronouns with the appropriate postpositions, e.g.

- Yang ra tri paun aiks. 'Give me three pounds.'
- Man wal aisaia want sna 'I want to talk to ("with") you.'

Forms for a third-person subject, in addition to indexing specific subjects that are equivalent to 'he', 'she', 'it', 'they' or 'we (inclusive)', are also used with transitive verbs to indicate a non-specific subject, thus providing a passive-like construction.

- Ai kaikan. 'He (etc.) saw me' but also 'I was seen.'

To indicate that a verb has a plural subject, a finite auxiliary, banghwaia, may be added at the end of the verb group, preceded by a same-subject participle.

- Maria ra kaiki banghwri. 'We (exc.) saw María.'

=== Conjugation ===
The stem of a verb is obtained by removing the -aia suffix from the infinitive. Most verb stems end in a consonant, and are conjugated as follows (our sample verb is pulaia 'play').

Regular verb
	Present I	Present II	Past I	Past II	Future I	Future II	Imperative
1	puluna	pulisna	pulatna	pulri	pulaisna	pulamna	
2	puluma	pulisma	pulatma	pulram	pulaisma	pulma	puls
3 and 1+2	puluya	pulisa	pulata	pulan	pulaisa	pulbia	

Verbs whose stems end in i (bri- 'have', wi- 'tell', pi- 'eat', di- 'drink', swi- 'allow') vary from the above paradigm in a few minor points. Bal-aia 'come' and w-aia 'go', have an irregular Present I tense. The verb yabaia 'give' is anomalous in a different way by having irregularly derived non-third-person object-indexing forms. Finally, the most irregular verb of all is the defective and irregular kaia 'to be'.

i-stem (piaia 'eat')
	Present I	Present II	Past I	Past II	Future I	Future II	Imperative
1	pisuna	pisna	pisatna	piri	piaisna	pimna	
2	pisuma	pisma	pisatma	piram	piaisma	pima	pis
3 and 1+2	pisuya	pisa	pisata	pin	piaisa	pibia	

Balaia, waia
	Present of balaia 'come'	Present of waia 'go'
1	aulna	auna
2	aulma	auma
3 / 1+2	aula	auya

Stems of yabaia 'give'
Object	1	2	3	1+2
Infinitive	aik-aia 'give me/us'	maik-aia 'give you'	yab-aia 'give him/her/it/them'	wank-aia 'give us (inc.)'

kaia 'be'
	Present	Past I	Past II	Future I	Future II	Imperative
1	sna	katna	kapri	kaisna	kamna	
2	sma	katma	kapram	kaisma	kama	bas
3 / 1+2	sa	kata	kan	kaisa	kabia	

=== Use of tenses ===
Present I expresses that an action is happening or about to happen at the time of speaking.

- Yang Miskitu aisuna. 'I am speaking Miskito.'
- Yang naha minit takuna. 'I am about to go out this minute.'

Present II is a general present, indistinctly progressive or habitual.

- Yang Miskitu aisisna. 'I speak Miskito.'

Past I is a perfect.

- Yang kuirku ba dakakatna. 'I have fed the pigs.'

As the nucleus of a main clause Past II is a simple aorist past. Connected to a following verb in a past or present tense within a switch reference chain, it functions as the different-subject participle (see below).

- Yang Meri ra kaikri. 'I saw Meri.'
- Yang buk nani ba sakri witin Meri ra yaban. 'I found the books and he gave them to Meri.' (or 'I having found the books...')

Future I expresses that an event is imminent.

- Jon pruaisa. 'Jon is going to die.'

Future II is a general future. It is also used as an irrealis in subordinate clauses.

- Man naha apilka pima kaka, man pruma. 'If you eat this apple, you will die.'
- Yawan anira wabia? 'Where shall we go?'
- Jon wantkan Meri balbia. 'Jon wanted Meri to come.'

The second-person imperative ends in -s; its negative (prohibitive) counterpart ending in -para. A gentler order may be expressed using the Past II second-person form (ending in -ram). The first-person inclusive plural imperative ('Let's...') ends in -p(i).

- Sturi nani kumkum yang nani ra ai wis! 'Tell us some stories!'
- Baku pali saura ai munpara. 'Do not treat me like that!'
- Umpira ai kaiks! 'Have pity on me!'

=== Switch reference and non-finite verb forms ===
		Switch reference participles				Negative participle	Past participle	Infinitive
		Same subject	Same subject anterior	Different subject past/present (= Past II)	Different subject future	Negative participle	Past participle	Infinitive
Regular	1	puli	pulisi	pulri	pulrika	pulras	pulan	pulaia
Regular	2	puli	pulisi	pulram	pulrika	pulras	pulan	pulaia
Regular	3 / 1+2	puli	pulisi	pulan	pulka	pulras	pulan	pulaia
kaia 'to be'	1	—	si	kapri	kaprika	—	kan	kaia
kaia 'to be'	2	—	si	kapram	kaprika	—	kan	kaia
kaia 'to be'	3 / 1+2	—	si	kan	kaka	—	kan	kaia

The switch reference participles are used in verb or clause chains sharing the same subject; only the last verb adopts a finite tense form.

- Utla wina taki kauhri. 'I fell coming out of the house.' ("Coming out of the house — I fell.")

These participles are also used in many compound verbs and periphrastic formations.

- bri balaia 'to bring' ("to have and come")
- puli kan 'he was playing'

The anterior participle further expresses that an event occurred before that expressed by the following verb.

- Watla ra dimisi witin wal aisari. 'After entering the house I spoke to him.' ("Having entered the house — I spoke with him."

The different-subject participle in -ka signals a change of subject between it and the following verb, and is used when the latter is in a future tense.

- Paul buk nani ba sakka witin Slilma ra yabia. 'When Paul_{i} finds the books, he_{j} will give them to Slilma.'

When the subject of the different subject participle is first or second person, the ending is -rika if the main verb is future.

- Man yarika takbia. 'You will let it out.' ("You letting, it will get out.")

When the last verb of a different-subject chain is in the present or past tense, the preceding verb must be in the Past II tense.

- Paul buk nani ba sakan witin Slilma ra yaban. 'When Paul_{i} found the books, he_{j} gave them to Slilma.'

The negative participle can be followed by a finite form of kaia to express any person-tense combination; alternatively these categories may be left implicit by omitting the auxiliary.

- Man ai kaikras kapram. 'You did not see me.'
- Man ai kaikras. 'You do/did/will not see me.'

The past participle, identical in form to the third-person of Past II, is used: (a) as a passive adjective;

- Satail ba bip tawa ni daukan kan. 'The saddle is made of cow's hide.'

(b) in a periphrastic passive construction with kaia as auxiliary;

- Yang kupran kapri. 'I was beaten.'

(c) in an idiomatic construction with daukaia 'make'.

- Mai kaikan ai daukisa. 'I would like to see you.' ("Seen you makes me.")

The uses of the infinitive: (a) approximates that of infinitives in many European languages:

- Aikuki la dauki banghwan tasba pis kum atkaia. 'They made a joint agreement to purchase a piece of land.'
- Pedro ai muihni nani aikuki aisaia wan. 'Pedro went and spoke with his brothers.'
- Diara sut brisma, dia mita wark pliki waia? 'You have everything, why go and look for work?'

(b) include several modal constructions.

- Yang wamtla ra waia want sna. 'I want to go to your house.'
- Yang wamtla ra waia sna. 'I have to go to your house.'
- Yang wamtla ra waia kapri. 'I should have gone to your house.'

Note: Given the differences in terminology, the following comparative table for names of non-finite forms used in this article, Salamanca's Miskito school grammar and Green's Lexicographic Study of Ulwa (a related language with similar categories) may be found useful:

This article
Salamanca
Green

same subject simultaneous participle
'gerundio'
'proximate'

same subject anterior participle
'transgresivo'

different subject future participle
'conexivo'
'obviative'

=== Periphrastic tenses ===
The range of aspectual, modal and other notions that can be expressed is enlarged considerably by the availability of various periphrastic constructions in which a verb acting as auxiliary is placed after the main verb. The conjugated component can take a variety of tenses, including periphrastic ones, and the periphrases themselves may often be combined; thus chains of several auxiliaries are possible. Some representative examples of such periphrases follow:

Puli kapri 'I was playing' consists of the same-subject participle of pulaia followed by the first person of Past II of kaia 'to be', "playing was-I".

- puli kapri 'I was playing' ("playing was-I")

Pulaia sna 'I am to play, I have to play' consists of kaia after an infinitive.

- pulaia sna 'I am to play' ("play-to am-I")

This construction with the auxiliary in Past II can express an impossible condition: pulaia kapri 'I should have played' or 'I would have played'.

- pulaia kapri 'I should/would have played' ("play-to was-I")

Combining the infinitive with other auxiliary verbs we obtain other modal constructions.

- pulaia want sna 'I want to play' ("play-to want am-I")

The particle sip, with an anomalous distribution, is used in expressions of possibility and ability.

- Witin sip sa utla kum paskaia. 'He can build a house.'
- Witin sip utla kum paskras sa. 'He cannot build a house.'

Another type of construction consists of a conjugated main verb followed by a third-person form of kaia. Various tense sequences for the two verbs are possible and convey a range of nuances. Past perfect and future perfect can be expressed by placing both verbs in Past II or future II respectively.

- pulri kan 'I had played'
- pulamna kabia 'I shall have played'

By compounding the past perfect construction again with sa, and then kaka for 'if' (itself really a form of kaia), we obtain an unfulfilled hypothetical clause.

- pulri kan sa kaka 'if I had played'

== Syntax ==
=== Word order ===
In Miskito **sentences** the verb (or verb group) regularly comes last. The subject, if expressed as a noun phrase, normally precedes objects and other constituents. In these examples the verb is in bold.

- Jon **pruaisa**. 'Jon is going to die.'
- (Yang) Honduras ra **iwisna**. 'I live in Honduras.'
- (Yang) Meri ra **kaikri**. 'I saw Meri.'
- Baha ya **daukan**? 'Who did this?'
- (Yang) Meri ra buk kum **yabri**. 'I gave Meri a book.'
- Mairin ba tuktan ra li ni **tahbisa**. 'The woman is bathing the baby with water.'
- Yang ra tri paun **aik**. 'Give me three pounds.'

However, long or heavier constituents (here in bold) may follow the verb.

- Yang **witin ra yabaia** wantsna. 'I want to give it to him/her.'
- **Naha mani champianshipka ba** ya wintakbia ni? 'Who do you think is going to win the championship this year?'

Demonstrative and interrogative determiners, the possessive proclitics ai and wan, and certain adjectives, precede the noun, which takes the ligature in these cases.

- **baha** araska 'that horse'
- **ani** araska? 'which horse?'
- **ai** araska 'his/her horse'
- aras karna ba 'the strong horse'

Articles and quantifiers follow nouns.

- aras **ba** 'the horse'
- aras **kum** 'a/one horse'
- aras **uya** 'many horses'
- aras **an**? 'how many horses?'

Adpositions and relationals follow the noun phrase.

- aras ba **wal** 'with the horse'
- aras ba **kainara** 'in front of the horse'

Auxiliaries follow main verbs.

- puli **kapri** 'I was playing'
- pulri **kan** 'I had played'
- pulaia **want sna** 'I want to play'

The object proclitics ai, mai and wan precede the main verb.

- **mai** kaikisna 'I see you'

The negative particle apia follows future-tense verbs, but precedes forms of kaia 'to be'.

- Ai kaikma **apia**. 'You will not see me.'
- Baha watla tawanki ra **apia** sa. 'That house is not in my village.'

In compound verbs, the conjugated element comes last.

- aisi **kaikri** 'I read it' ("speaking I-saw")
- bri **aulna** 'I am bringing it' ("having I-am-coming")
- want **sna** 'I want it'
- win **takbia** 'he/she/it will win'

Sentence particles follow the verb.

- Man balma **ki**? 'Will you come?'
- Ya win takbia **ni**? 'I wonder who will win!'

In **subordination structures** the rule that places subordinate elements first is frequently overridden by a tendency to place long and heavy constituents last.

- **Watla ra dimisi** witin wal aisari. 'After entering the house I spoke to him.'
- **Piter buknan ba sakan tem**, Slilma ra yabri. 'When Piter found the books, I gave them to Slilma.'
- Johan wantkan **Kati balbia**. 'Johan wanted Kati to come.'

Relative clauses precede the head.

- **Meri atkan** araska ba 'the horse that Meri bought'

Complement and circumstantial clauses may precede or follow the main clause.

- Plawar abalkaisna **brid daukaia mata**. 'I am going to mix flour in order to make bread.'
- **Witin plun atkaia auya kan bara**, ai yaptika ba balan. 'When he was about to buy food, his mother came.'

=== Propositional structure ===
While no systematic case marking differentiates formally between subjects and objects, there exist (apart from word order) certain option for achieving disambiguation.

One is to mark animate direct objects with the postposition ra.

- Meri **ra** kaikri. 'I saw Meri.'

Another is to identify the agent of a transitive verb with the postposition mita. Since mita always occurs with agents of transitive verbs it might be viewed as a proto-ergative marker.

- Puisin **mita** ikan. 'The poison killed him/her.'
- Piter **mita** Meri wamtlara brih wan. 'Piter brought Meri to your house.'

Yet another way to identify the subject is for it to participate in a verbal periphrasis. Outwardly, the 'particle' bui is placed after such subjects. Bui is the same-subject participle of buaia 'get up', so the semantic route of this grammaticalization is, for example, from 'Who will get up and remove it?' to 'Who (subject) will remove it?' The use of bui allows an object to precede a subject (for topicalization) without this leading to ambiguity. Bui almost always occurs with subjects of transitive verbs and so may again be understood as a proto-ergative marker.

- Prari **bui** duri abakan. 'The hurricane sunk the canoe.'
- Yâ **bui** ai kangban? 'Who touched me?'

=== Information structure ===
A system of specialized postpositions is used to identify topics and focused constituents:

Lika is a particle that may follow a sentence constituent identifying it as sentence topic.

Sika may be placed after a definite noun phrase to foreground it; its effect is similar to that of focus clefting in English.

- Baku **lika** yang maipara an man mampara sin aitani kabia. 'That way, it will be good for me and for you too.'
- Yang nini **lika** Juan. 'My name is Juan.'
- Pedro mahka wan, bara María **lika** takaskan. 'Pedro left, and/but María stayed.'
- Naha **sika** diara nani na dawanka kabia. 'This is who is going to own these things.'
- Witin **sika** yaptiki. 'She is my mother.'

=== Valency ===
Most verbs are built up from a monosyllabic lexical root ending in a vowel or a single consonant, to which an extension or stem consonant is very often added. The extensions correlate with transitivity: transitive stems have either -k- or -b- (unpredictably), while intransitive stems have -w-. There is also a valency-decreasing verb-prefix ai- which, added to transitive stems, produces unergative, reflexive, reciprocal or middle verbs. See the section on Derivation (below) for examples.

Miskito has periphrastic causative expressions using one or another of the causation verbs yabaia 'give', munaia 'make', swiaia 'let'. In these constructions, the verb of causation is subordinated to the verb of action.

- Pedro tuktika ra **swika** pulbia. 'Pedro will let the child play.' "P. letting the child, (it) will play"

=== Negation ===
To negate a verb, the invariable negative participle in -ras is used either alone or followed by an auxiliary specifying tense and person.

- Man ai **kaikras**. 'You do/did/will not see me.'
- Man ai **kaikras kapram**. 'You did not see me.'

For the future tenses only, another option is to place apia after the future verb form.

- Man ai **kaikma apia**. or Man ai **kaikras kama**. 'You will not see me.'

The second person imperative has its own special negative form, with the verbal suffix -para.

- Baku yang nanira ai **wipara**. 'Do not speak to us like that!'

The verb kaia, having no negative participle, is negated by a preposed apia.

- Yang aitani **apia** sna. 'I am not worthy.'

'Nothing', 'nobody' and so on are expressed using indefinite words, generally accompanied by sin 'also, even', usually in combination with negative verb forms.

- **Upla kumi** sin balras. 'Nobody came.'
- Yang **upla kumi** sin ra kaikras. 'I didn't see anybody.'
- Muihki **upla kumi** ra sin **diara** wiras. 'My brother did not tell anybody anything.'
- **Pyu kumi** sin sîka nît apia kaka dipara. 'Never take medicine if you do not need it.'

=== Questions ===
Question words
**ya** 'who'; **dia** 'what'; **ani** 'which'; **an** 'how many'	**anira** 'where'; **ahkia** 'when'; **nahki** 'how'; **diakan** 'why'

The sentence-final particle ki may, optionally, be used in either yes-no or wh-questions.

- Man balma **ki**? 'Will you come?'
- Buk an brisma **ki**? 'How many books do you have?'

With or without ki, in wh-questions the interrogative element either stands at the beginning of the question...

- **Ya** baha daukan? 'Who did this?'
- **Diakan** man baku lukisma ki? 'Why do you think so?'

...or immediately precedes the verb.

- Yawan **anira** wabia? 'Where shall we go?'
- Inska ba wal **dia** daukamna ki? 'What shall I do with the fish?'

Yâ 'who' as the agentive subject of a question may be followed by the bui marker (see above).

- **Ya bui** ai kangban? 'Who touched me?'

Indirect questions may be followed by saba (or sapa).

- Witin wan dia daukan **saba** kaikaia. 'He went to see what he had done.'

In yes–no questions sentence-final ki is optional. Such questions may be answered with au 'yes' or apia 'no'.

- Man sma ki? — **Au**, yang sika. 'Is it you? — Yes, it's me.'
- Man nani naha sut kaikisma? 'Do you (pl.) see all this?'

=== Sentence mood particles ===
Sentence-final mood particles
- **bika** surprise, exclamation
- **ni** 'I wonder'
- **ki** question, surprise

Mood particles may be placed at the end of a sentence (i.e. following the verb). See the example of ki above.

- Yang baku sma **bika**! 'Why, you are like me!'
- Wimna kaka laubia **ni**? 'I wonder if he'll get angry if I tell him.'

=== Coordinating conjunctions ===
Coordinating conjunctions
- bara, bamna, an 'and'
- apia kaka, o, ar 'or'
- sakuna, kuna 'but'

- Kumi ba sirpi kan **bara** wala ba tara kan. 'One was small and the other was big.'
- Juan **an** Pedro talia sa. 'Juan and Pedro are similar.'
- Ai aisika, **apia kaka** ai yaptika wal aisaia sa. 'It is necessary to talk to his father or his mother.'
- Witin aisan **sakuna** yang tanka briras. 'He spoke but I didn't understand.'

=== Relative clauses ===
There are two major constructions which may be used to form relative clauses in Miskito, the 'external head' strategy and the 'internal head' strategy.

In the external head strategy there is no subordination marker of any kind and the relative clause precedes the head noun, which takes a ligature, beside which it usually has an article too.

- **Sarah atkan** watla ba Bilwi ra sa. 'The house that Sarah bought is in Bilwi.'
- Naha tawanka ra **truk kum bri** uplika manis bara sa. 'In this town there are a lot of people who own a car.'

If the head is not expressed, an article following the relative clause serves to identify and delimit it.

- **Aras ra alkan** nani ba bui asiki ra brih wan. 'Those who caught the horse took it to my father.'

In the internal head construction, the head noun is not extracted from the place it underlyingly occupies in the relative clause, which is bounded by an article as in headless external head clauses.

- **Sarah watla atkan** ba Bilwi ra sa. 'The house that Sarah bought is in Bilwi.' (as if to say: "The Sarah bought the house is in Bilwi.")

In the 'headless' counterpart of the internal construction, the place of the head within the relative clause is occupied by an interrogative pronoun.

- **Dia makama** ba, yang maikamna. 'I will give you what you ask.'

=== Complement clauses ===
A complement clause may bear no subordination marker but merely be followed by the article ba functioning in practice as a nominalizer.

- Yang nahwala waitna kum ra ikan **ba** nu takri. 'I have heard the news that a man was killed yesterday.'

Indirect questions end in saba (i.e. sa 'is' + ba article).

- Witin wan dia daukan **saba** kaikaia. 'He went to see what he had done.'

The tense of complement clauses does not follow that of the matrix clause, but directly expresses a time relation in reference to the matrix.

- Witin nani walan Pedro ba raya **sa**. 'They heard that Pedro was alive.' ("...that P. is alive")

Complement clauses that have no autonomous time reference ('irrealis') take Future II.

- Jon **Sarah balbia** wantkan. 'Jon wanted Sarah to come.'

=== Conditional and concessive clauses ===
**Conditional** ('if') clauses add kaka and precede the consequence clause. (Kaka is the third-person different subject participle of kaia 'be', literally "it being (the case that)".)

**Concessive** ('although') clauses may end in sin 'also, either, even', or in sakuna 'but'.

- Man naha apilka pima **kaka**, man pruma. 'If you eat this apple, you will die.'
- Yang naha tasba wina katna **kaka**, aiklabaia kapri. 'If I were from this land, I would fight.'
- Witin nahwala sula kum kaikan kan sa **kaka**, ikaia kan. 'If he had seen a deer yesterday, he would have killed it.'
- Aisikam nani balbia apia, yang witin nani ra bik takamna **sin**. 'Your parents will not come, even if I beg them to.'
- Piter wintakaisa, witin saura pali sa **sakuna**. 'Piter will win, even though he is very bad.'

=== Circumstantial clauses ===
Circumstantial clauses generally end in a subordinating conjunction of some sort. Sometimes the article ba precedes the conjunction, which may take the form of a preposition...

- * Witin plun atkaia auya kan **bara**, ai yaptika ba balan. 'When he was about to buy food, his mother came.' (bara = ba + ra)

a relational...

- Baha daukaia **dukiara** diara manis nit sa. 'In order to do that, many things are needed.'
- Plawar abalkaisna brid daukaia **mata**. 'I am going to mix flour in order to make bread.'
- Plun piras **kainara** ai mihta sikban. 'Before eating food he washed his hands.'

or a noun.

- Yang buk kum aisi kaiki kapri **taim**, man bal dimram. 'When I was reading a book, you came in.'

== Lexicon ==
=== General ===
As regards origin, the Miskito lexicon consists of the following principal components:

- words of native Miskito origin;
- a considerable number of loans from surrounding languages of the related Sumo group;
- a large number of loan words from English;
- a smaller number of words borrowed from Spanish.

=== Derivation ===
Some derivational affixes:

Affix	Function	Meaning	Examples
-ira suffix	(1) adjectives from nouns (with ligature)	abundance	tawa 'hair' → taw-ira 'hairy'; kipla 'rock' → kipl-ika → kipl-ik-ira 'rocky'
	(2) adjectives from nominalized adjectives in -(i)ka	superlative	karna 'strong' → karn-ika → karn-ik-ira 'very strong'; sirpi 'small' → sirpi-ka → sirpi-k-ira 'very small'; tara 'big' → tar-ka → tar-k-ira 'very big'
-s suffix	adjectives from nouns (with ligature)	privative, '-less'	napa 'tooth' → napa-s 'toothless'; tangni 'flower' → tangni-ka → tangni-ka-s 'flowerless'; walpa 'stone' → walpa-ya → walpa-ya-s 'stoneless'
-(i)ka suffix	nouns from adjectives	abstract nouns, '-ness' (cf. ligature)	karna 'strong' → karn-ika 'strength'; ingni 'bright' → ingni-ka 'brightness'
-(i)ra suffix	nouns from adjectives	abstract nouns, '-ness'	sirpi 'small' → sirpi-ra 'smallness'; siksa 'black' → siks-ira 'blackness'
-aika suffix	nouns from verbs	(1) instrument	pahb-aia 'sweep' → pahb-aika 'broom'
		(2) place	plap-aia 'run' → plap-aika 'track'
-anka suffix	nouns from verbs	action (nominalized past participle)	pahb-aia 'sweep' → pahb-anka 'act of sweeping'
-ra suffix	nouns from verbs	action	plap-aia 'run' → plap-ra 'running'
reduplication + -ra suffix	nouns from verbs	(1) agent, '-er'	plap-aia 'run' → pla-plap-ra 'runner'
		(2) undergoer	raw-aia 'get better, be cured' → ra-raw-ra 'patient'
-b- or -k- suffix	(1) verbs from verb roots	transitive verb	dak-b-aia 'cut (tr.)'; ra-k-aia 'cure (tr.)'
	(2) verbs from adjective roots		rat-ni 'wet (adj.)' → rat-b-aia 'wet (tr.)'
-w- suffix	verbs	intransitive verb	dak-w-aia 'break (intr.)'; ra-w-aia 'be cured'
	(2) verbs from adjective roots		ing-ni 'bright' → ing-w-aia 'shine'
ai- prefix	intransitive verbs from transitives	reflexive or middle	sak-b-aia 'stretch (sth.) out' → ai-sak-b-aia 'lie down'; srung-k-aia 'cover' → ai-srung-k-aia 'cover oneself'

=== Lexical compounds ===
Miskito has a large number of light-verb constructions or compound verbs which consist of two words but express meanings that are lexically determined for the construction as a whole, e.g.

- aisikaikaia 'read' ("speak and see")
- bribalaia 'bring' ("have and come")
- bilawalaia 'obey' ("hear word")
- kupiabaikaia 'get angry' ("split heart")

A similar construction is used in verbs that are loans from English: the borrowed lexeme is an invariable element (help, wark, want...) followed by a Miskito verb, e.g.

- helpmunaia 'help' ("do help")
- warktakaia 'work' ("go out work")
- wantkaia 'want' ("be want")

Nominal compounds are much less common.

- bip mairin 'cow' ("beef/bovine female")

== Typological overview ==
=== Phonology ===
==== Phoneme inventory ====
The Miskito phoneme inventory includes four vowels (a, e, i, o, u), apparently with phonemic length playing a part. Consonant series include voiced and voiceless plosives, voiced nasals and semivowels, two liquids and the fricative s. Orthographic h apparently represents a suprasegmental feature.

==== Other aspects ====
Syllables consist of a vowel nucleus preceded and followed by a maximum of two consonant: (C)(C)V(C)(C). Word stress is normally on the first syllable and not distinctive.

=== Morphology ===
Inflectional and derivational morphology are of moderate complexity and predominantly suffixing, together with the use of infixes in the nominal paradigm.

==== Nominal morphology ====
The nominal morphological categories are ligature and person (but not number) of the possessor, the exponents of which have suffix and infix allophones, except for third person and first person inclusive possessor indices, which are preposed particles. Plural number is indicated by a postpositive particle.

==== Verbal morphology ====
In the verbal morphology, tense, mood and person (of the subject) are marked by suffixes (and sometimes fused into portmanteau suffix forms). Object indices of transitive verbs are represented by particles preceding the verb (third person is zero). Number is not marked in these subject and object indices, but a plural subject may be indicated through a verbal periphrasis serving this function.

=== Syntax ===
==== Word order ====
Word order
- object + verb
- determiner (except article) + head
- head + article
- head + quantifier
- adjective + head / head + adjective
- possessor + head
- relative clause + head
- head + postposition
- verb + auxiliary
- sentence + particle
- subordinate clause + subordinator

Sentence order is predominantly SOV. Auxiliaries follow main verbs. Sentence particles are sentence-final. Within the noun phrase, most determiners precede the head, but articles follow it, as do quantifiers. Adjectives may either precede or follow the head noun. Possessors precede possessed, and relative clauses precede their head. The ligature morpheme generally occurs on the noun whenever this is preceded by one of the items mentioned, and also when it takes a possessive index. Postpositional structures are found.

==== Head or dependent marking ====
HEAD-marking constructions
- subject + VERB
- object + VERB
- possessor + POSSESSED
- noun + RELATIONAL

Miskito is consistently head-marking. There is pro-drop for both subject and object (i.e. subject and object pronouns are commonly omitted). The finite verb's subject argument is indexed for person (not for number) on the verb. Transitive verbs also index their object through pre-verbal particles (zero for third person). A maximum of one such object index is possible. If a transitive verb has both a patient and a recipient, the latter is not indexed and appears as a postpositional phrase (indirect object).

The expression of nominal possessive or genitive relations is similarly head-marking: the head (i.e. the possessed) is marked with indices indicating the person of the dependent (the possessor), the noun phrase expressing which is either omitted normally if pronominal (a pro-drop phenomenon) or precedes the head, e.g. arask-i 'my horse' (or yang arask-i), araska 'his horse' (zero-marked possessor), Juan araska 'Juan's horse' (cf. aras 'horse' without ligature).

==== Adpositions ====
Other relations between a verb and its noun phrase complements or adjuncts are expressed by means of postpositional structures or relational constructions. Postpositions are invariable and follow the noun phrase, e.g. Nicaragua ra 'in/to Nicaragua'. A relational construction has the internal form of a possessive construction (above), except that the place of the head noun is occupied by a quasi-noun called a relational; the latter is often followed by a postpositon. E.g. nin-i-ra (or yang ninira) 'behind me', nina-ra (or witin ninara) 'behind him', Juan nina-ra 'behind Juan', where the relational nina imitates a possessed noun.

==== Predication, sentence types and compound and complex sentences ====
There is a copula with an irregular and defective conjugational paradigm.

Negation is achieved through various constructions. One is the use of the verb's negative participle, which is invariable for person and tense; another is through use of a negative particle apia which follows verbs (in the future only), but precedes the copula. Yes–no questions have no special grammatical marking as such, but all kinds of questions are optionally followed by the sentence particle ki. Other sentence particles express different modal nuances.

Verbs or whole clauses may be conjoined by juxtaposition, all but the last verb in the chain adopting the form of a switch reference participle. These vary in form depending on whether the following verb has the same or a different subject, and also depending on certain tense or aspect relations, and on the person of the subject in the case of different-subject participles.

Besides these widely used constructions, clauses may also be linked by coordinating conjunctions, and subordinate clauses may be marked by a clause-final subordinator.

== See also ==
- Miskito language
- Miskito
- Misumalpan languages
