= David W. Johnson (scholar) =

American psychologist

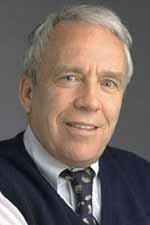
- D.W. Johnson
- Born: 1940 (age 85–86); Muncie, Indiana
- Occupation: Scholar
- Relatives: Roger Johnson
- Awards: Lifetime Achievement Award from Division G (Social Context of Education) of the American Educational Research Association

Academic background
- Education: Ball State University
- Alma mater: Teachers College, Columbia University
- Doctoral advisor: Morton Deutsch

Academic work
- Discipline: Social psychology

David W. Johnson (born 1940 in Muncie, Indiana) is a social psychologist whose research has focused on four overlapping areas: cooperative, competitive, and individualistic efforts; constructive controversy; conflict resolution and peer mediation and experiential learning to teach interpersonal and small group skills. Johnson has developed and applied psychological knowledge in effort to improve practices within educational systems. Johnson's books have been translated into 20 different languages and his work has been applied in many countries.

== Early life and education ==
He grew up in a family of seven children, living for several years on a family farm. Currently, he lives in Minneapolis, Minnesota. He graduated from Ball State University in 1962, received a master's degree and a doctoral degree in social psychology from Teachers College, Columbia University in 1964 and 1966 respectively, with Morton Deutsch as his dissertation advisor.

== Career ==
Since 1966 he has worked at the University of Minnesota in the Department of Educational Psychology, becoming a full professor in 1973. His brother Roger Johnson came to the University of Minnesota in 1969 and together they founded the Cooperative Learning Center.

== Social interdependence theory, cooperation, and appropriate competition ==
Johnson began his work on social interdependence theory and the appropriate use of cooperative, competitive, and individualistic efforts in the mid-1960s. At that time, elementary, secondary, and university teaching was dominated by competitive and individualistic learning. Social Darwinism, with its premise that students must be taught to survive in a "dog-eat-dog" world dominated educational thought, although it was being challenged by individualistic learning largely based on B. F. Skinner's work on programmed learning and behavioral modification. In the 60's and 70's, while cooperative learning was generally ignored by educators, Johnson challenged the prevailing competitive and individualistic practices by presenting the theory and research on cooperative, competitive, and individualistic learning, creating operational procedures for cooperative learning and appropriate competition, and implementing cooperative learning in schools and universities.

=== Research review ===
Johnson's first published review of the research on cooperation and competition appeared in 1970 in his book, The Social Psychology of Education. This was followed by a more comprehensive review, with his brother Roger, published in the Review of Educational Research in 1974 and the editing of a special issue of the Journal of Research and Development in Education in 1978. In 1981 and 1983 he pioneered the use of meta-analysis in publishing reviews of the impact of cooperative, competitive, and individualistic on achievement/productivity and on interpersonal attraction. In 1989 he and his brother published a book, Cooperation and Competition: Theory and Research, which contained a series of meta-analyses (currently being revised with updates)on many of the dependent variables relevant to Social Interdependence Theory.

=== Extension of theory ===
Social interdependence theory was originally formulated by Morton Deutsch in 1949. While Deutsch created the basic structure of theory, many of its implications were left unexplored and several of its assumptions were unchallenged. In his research, Johnson explicated the conditions underlying effective cooperation and constructive competition. In the 1989 meta-analysis book, the breath of social interdependence theory was extended to a wider range of outcomes and the internal dynamics of effective cooperation were more clearly delineated. More recently, in 2003, Johnson published a review of Social Interdependence Theory in the American Psychologist, and in 2005 he and his brother published an update of the theory in Psychological Monographs

=== Program of research ===
Over the past 40 years, in collaboration with his brother and colleagues, Johnson has published over 100 research studies on the impact of cooperative, competitive, and individualistic efforts on a wide variety of outcomes, including achievement and productivity, higher-level reasoning, motivation, perspective-taking, social development, social skills, interpersonal attraction (among relatively homogeneous individuals, individuals from different ethnic and cultural groups, and handicapped and nonhandicapped individuals), social support, self-esteem, and psychological health. He conducted a program of research to identify the factors that mediate the impact of cooperation, such as positive interdependence, individual accountability, promotive interaction, social skills, and group processing. In addition, he has conducted a series of studies identifying the conditions under which competition results in constructive outcomes.

=== Implementation ===
In the mid-1960s Johnson began training educators in the use of cooperative, competitive, and individualistic learning. While the theory existed and was validated, the procedures for structuring cooperation were largely unspecified. Johnson developed such procedures for teachers, specifying three types of cooperative learning: formal cooperative learning (students work together to achieve a joint learning goal for a major part of one class period to several weeks), informal cooperative learning (students work to achieve a joint learning goal in temporary, ad-hoc groups that last for a few minutes), and cooperative base groups (students work together to achieve joint goals in a long-term group lasting from a semester to several years).

Additionally, he has developed procedures for administrators leading "cooperative schools": collegial teaching teams, school-based decision-making and cooperative faculty meetings. These procedures appeared in his books, Learning Together and Alone: Cooperative, Competitive, and Individualistic Learning (first published in 1975 and now in its fifth edition), Cooperation in the Classroom (first published in 1984 and now in its eighth edition), and Leading the Cooperative School (first published in 1989 and now in its second edition). Overall, he has written 33 other books for teachers, professors, and administrators on how to use cooperative learning. These books include those written for the Association for Supervision and Curriculum Development and for ASHE-ERIC. Johnson's books and training materials have provided guidance for using cooperation to educators all over the world.

Finally, to ensure that the operational procedures were actually used, David and Roger Johnson founded the Cooperative Learning Center at the University of Minnesota in the early 1970s and established a network of school districts that conducted multi-year efforts to implement cooperative learning and the cooperative school. Additionally, a network of staff development leaders (employed by school districts) have committed themselves to the long-term implementation of cooperative learning.

Nowadays, cooperative learning is a valued instructional procedure at all levels of education. Cooperative Learning Centers have been established in many countries around the world, as the Hong Kong Cooperative Learning Center, which had Johnson conduct a seven-year project to train faculty from all seven Hong Kong universities and many mainland universities in the use of cooperative learning. Cooperative Learning Centers can be found in Shanghai, Japan, Cyprus, Norway, Italy, and at multiple places in the United States and Canada.

== Constructive controversy ==
Johnson began documenting the essential role of intellectual conflict in effective instruction and decision making in the 1960s when conflict was largely seen as undesirable and destructive. His formulation of constructive controversy theory, the program of research and the operational procedures that he created, have now made constructive controversy a frequently used procedure in education and in decision making situations in a wide variety of organizations. His work demonstrates the instructional and decision-making power of intellectual conflict and highlights the importance of training all citizens in a democracy in the controversy procedure to enable them to engage in constructive political discourse.

=== Research review, extension of theory and program of research ===
Similar to procedures he followed in his work on social interdependence, Johnson published a review of the research relevant to constructive controversy. Using these reviews as a base, Johnson formulated constructive controversy theory. He then created the operational procedures for using controversy in decision making and instructional situations (Joining Together: Group Theory and Group Skills). Research reviews were published in 1979, 1989, 1995, 2000, and 2003.

To validate and extend the theory, Johnson (with his colleagues and brother) has published over 15 research studies in constructive controversy. Overall, 25 non-research articles, reviews, and book chapters have been published by Johnson in collaboration with his brother and colleagues.

=== Implementation ===
In the 1970s, Johnson began training teachers in how to utilize constructive controversy for instructional purposes. The procedures teachers use to structure constructive controversies were described in various book chapters and articles beginning in the 1970s. The first book detailing the procedures, Creative Conflict was published in 1987. Constructive Controversy: Intellectual Challenge in the Classroom was published in 1991 and is now in its fourth edition.

== Conflict resolution and peer mediation ==
In an effort to ensure conflicts of interests are managed constructively, in the 1960s Johnson began a program of teaching elementary, secondary, and university students to be "peacemakers" in the sense of knowing how to engage in integrative negotiations and mediate peer conflicts. The Teaching Students To Be Peacemakers program consists of (a) teaching students how conflicts are potentially constructive, (b) the strategies for managing conflicts, (c) how to engage in integrative negotiations, and (d) how to mediate conflicts among peers. All students in a class or school are trained, and then each takes his or her turn at being a peer mediator. While there are many conflict resolution and peer mediation training programs, what makes this one unique is that it is based on the theory concerning constructive conflict and has been more thoroughly researched.

=== Research review ===
More specifically, the reviews of the literature related to the conflict resolution and peer mediation program began in 1971 with the summary of Johnson's research on perspective-taking in conflict situations, following by reviews on communication in conflicts in 1973 and 1974 and numerous other subsequent reviews. In 1996 he published the first comprehensive review of the research on school conflict resolution and peer mediation programs in the Review of Educational Research

=== Extension of theory ===
Johnson's theorizing on integrative negotiations began in 1966 with his dissertation on perspective taking in integrative and distributive conflict situations. His theory of constructive conflict was first published in 1970 in his book, The Social Psychology of Education, and then refined and elaborated in three subsequent books (Reaching Out, Joining Together, Human Relations and Your Career) The theory was substantially revised in 1987 with the publication of Creative Conflict and then finalized with the publication of Teaching Student To Be Peacemakers in 1991.

=== Program of research ===
Johnson's research efforts began in the 1960s. Overall, he has published over 25 studies on integrative negotiations, conflict resolution, and peer mediation. In the 1980s, Johnson began direct research studies on teaching school students, from kindergarten to high school, how to engage in integrative negotiations and mediate peers' conflicts. In addition, he has published over 28 non-empirical articles and book chapters describing the nature of integrative negotiations and peer mediation, the research validating their use, and the operational procedures needed to engage in them.

=== Implementation ===
Finally, the Peacemaker Program has been implemented in elementary, secondary, and university settings throughout North America and many parts of the world. The book has been translated into Korean and Arabic, and book chapters on the program have been published in Spanish and several other languages. The Teaching Students To Be Peacemakers Program was presented in Israel in January, 2000 to a group of Israeli Jewish School Principals, Israeli Bedouin school principals, and Palestinian school principals from Gaza as the means to teach their students how to manage conflicts constructively. The program was identified as an Effective Program through the National Registry of Effective Prevention Programs (NREPP) in the U.S. Department of Health and Human Services and as a Model Program by the Substance Abuse and Mental Health Administration also in the U. S. Department of Health and Human Services.

== Social skills and experiential learning ==
Johnson has published two of the classic books in the field of Experiential Learning (Reaching Out: Interpersonal Effectiveness and Self-Actualization and Joining Together: Group Theory and Group Skills ). The books utilize experiential learning to teach interpersonal and small group skills. These books present an overall theoretical framework for defining interpersonal and small group skills, systematic reviews of the research on the skills, and numerous experiential exercises to teach them. These books have been used all over the world and are now in their eleventh editions. Many of the research studies on cooperation and conflict resolution, furthermore focus on social skills and the implementation of these programs involves the implementation of the teaching of social skills. Among the training programs he has conducted, Johnson trained educators how to teach students social skills at a United Nations Educational, Scientific, and Cultural Organization Conference in Beirut, Lebanon, in May 2000.

== Peace education ==
Johnson joined SANE in the early 1960s and has been active in peace movements since that time. He has edited two special issues of Journals on Peace Education and written eight articles and book chapters on the issue. He has been a major speaker at several international conferences (Australia, Cyprus) on peace education and reconciliation.

Cooperative learning is being used in Armenia as a basic procedure for teaching elementary and secondary students the skills necessary to be a citizen in a democracy. Johnson has helped train teachers and administrators in Armenia to implement cooperative learning as part of a democratic citizenship program. He has also helped a United Nations Program in Turkey to implement cooperative learning as part of a training program to reduce violence towards women in that country.

Constructive controversy is being used to teach elementary and secondary students how to be citizens in a democracy in such countries as Azerbaijan, Czech Republic, and Lithuania.

== Psychotherapy ==
Johnson is a practicing psychotherapist who had a part-time psychotherapy practice from 1973 to 1987at the Nicollet Clinic in Minneapolis. During that time he conducted a series of studies on therapist behavior and wrote three book chapters on psychotherapy methods. He is a licensed consulting psychologist in Minnesota and is listed in the National Register of Health Service Providers in Psychology. Since 1966, Johnson has been a member of the National Training Laboratories Institute for Applied Behavioral Science.

== Civil Rights Movement ==
In 1960, Johnson began conducting research on reducing prejudice and became involved in the national civil rights movement. He was awarded the Russell Bull Scholarship Award (given by the United Packinghouse, Food, and Allied Workers) for the most outstanding work done in civil rights in the United States in 1962 (Martin Luther King Jr. chaired the selection committee). During the summer of 1963, he led a day camp for children in the Bedford–Stuyvesant area of Brooklyn, New York, and a youth center for the Brooklyn Bishops (a street gang). In 1964, he helped plan and conduct the training program for the Mississippi Freedom Summer sponsored by the Mississippi Student Nonviolent Coordinating Committee (SNCC). From 1963 to 1965, Johnson taught African American history at Freedom Schools in New York City, sponsored by the Harlem Parents Committee, and conducted two studies on the impact of learning Black history on African American children. At the same time, he worked with the Northern Student Movement, among other things organizing rent strikes in Harlem. He trained group leaders in the use of guided group interaction for juvenile delinquents in the Essex Fields Program in New Jersey. In the late 1960s and early 1970s, Johnson worked with teenage runaways and teenagers with drug problems (through The Bridge and the Walk In Counseling Center in Minneapolis). He has been active in politics, serving as Treasurer for the 2nd Ward in Minneapolis in the late 1960s and early 1970s, and ran for the Minnesota State Legislature twice in the 1990s. Finally, his correspondence with Martin Luther King Jr. is being included in the Martin Luther King Library.

== Honors and awards ==
Johnson is a past editor of the American Educational Research Journal (1981-1983). He founded and is past Chair of two Special Interest Groups in the American Educational Research Association: Cooperative Learning: Theory, Research, and Practice and Conflict Resolution and Violence Prevention.

In 2012 he received the Lifetime Achievement Award from Division G (Social Context of Education) of the American Educational Research Association. In 2011 he received the Alfred M. Wellner Distinguished Career Psychologist Award from the National Register of Health Service Providers in Psychology. In 2010 Johnson received the Jeffrey Rubin Theory To Practice Award, awarded by the International Association for Conflict Management and the Program on Negotiation at the Harvard Law School. In 2008 Johnson received the American Educational Research Association's Distinguished Contributions to Research in Education Award. David Johnson, with his brother Roger, was the recipient of the 2007 Brock International Prize in Education.

In 2003 Johnson received the American Psychological Association's Distinguished Contributions of Applications of Psychology to Education and Training Award. In 1981 David Johnson, with his brother Roger and Geoffrey Maruyama, received the Gordon Allport Intergroup Relations Award, presented by the Society for the Psychological Study of Social Issues (Division 9 of the APA).

In 2004 David Johnson, with his brother Roger, received the Distinguished Scholar Award for Outstanding Research on Democratic Citizenship from the Democratic Citizenship in Education Special Interest Group of the American Educational Research Association. In 2001 they received the Distinguished Scholar Award from the Stress and Coping Special Interest Group of the American Educational Research Association. In 1996 they received the Award For Outstanding Research Contribution To Cooperative Learning from the Special Interest Group, Cooperative Learning: Theory, Research, and Practice of the American Educational Research Association. In 2010 they received the Promise Award given by the Conflict Resolution and Violence Prevention Special Interest Group of the American Educational Research Association. Also in 2010 David received the Jeffrey-Rubin Theory to Practice Award from the International Association for Conflict Management and the Program on Negotiation at the Harvard Law School. In 2011 David received the Alfred M. Wellner Distinguished Career Psychologist Award given by the National Register of Health Service Providers in Psychology. In 2013 David received the Lifetime Achievement Award of Division G (Social Context of Education) of the American Education Research Association. In 2014 David was given the Distinguished Alumni Award, Teachers College, Columbia University. In 2015 David was given the Award for Life Time Contributions to Thinking Education, by the International Conference on Thinking (ICOT). Also in 2015 David and Roger were given the Lifetime Achievement Award by the International Association for the Study of Cooperation. In 2016 David was given the Gold Metal for Life Achievement in the Application of Psychology by the American Psychological Foundation.
