= Inside-outside circle =

Inside-outside circle is a cooperative learning strategy. Students form two concentric circles and take turns on rotation to face new partners to answer or discuss the teacher’s questions. This method can be used to gather variety of information, generate new ideas and solve problems.

== Process of the strategy ==
In the inside-outside circle strategy, the teacher poses a particular question or a problem to the students. The teacher's role is to facilitate and guide discussions. The teacher divides the class into two equal groups. The inner circle is formed by one of the groups and the other group forms an outer circle. Students in the inside circle stand facing the students in the outside circle.

The teacher poses a particular question to the students. The students are given some time to think about it. Then, each student in the inner circle is given time to share their opinions about the question with his or her partner of the outside circle and vice versa. On the teacher’s signal, the students take one step to their left in the outside circle and have another quick discussion with their new partner. The teacher gives adequate time for the students to take down new ideas and information in their notebooks.

== Advantages ==
- It provides opportunities for classroom interaction and physical movement in class.
- It is an effective way to develop communication skills.
- Students pair up and share their ideas. This facilitates working with different students of the class to gather information.
- The students are actively involved in discussions throughout the class.
