= Positive interdependence =

Element of cooperative learning

Positive interdependence is an element of cooperative and collaborative learning where members of a group who share common goals perceive that working together is individually and collectively beneficial, and success depends on the participation of all the members.

In contrast to negative interdependence (i.e., individuals can only achieve their goal via the failure of a competitor) and no interdependence (i.e., a correlation does not exist between individuals' goals), positive interdependence happens when "individuals perceive that they can attain their goals if and only if the other individuals with whom they are cooperatively linked attain their goals". Consequently, positive interdependence results in members of a group "encouraging and facilitating each other's efforts...in order to reach the group's goals".

Positive interdependence can also be understood by its effects on the psychological processes of learners in a group setting. It promotes substitutability (the degree to which actions of one group member substitutes for the actions of another), positive cathexis (investment of positive psychological energy in objects outside one's self), and inducibility (openness to influencing and being influenced by others), whereas Negative Interdependence creates nonsubstituability, negative cathexis and a resistance to being influenced by others.

== Modern history ==
Derived from the constructivist learning theory and social psychology's social interdependence theory, positive interdependence theory is the foundation of modern collaborative and cooperative practice in business, science, and education.

Kurt Koffka, one of the founders of the gestalt school of psychology, proposed that interdependence was essential for a group to become a dynamic whole and recognized that interdependence will vary from one individual to another within the group. As part of his early work in social and organizational psychology, his student Kurt Lewin theorized that the essence of the group gestalt depends on interdependence among members, and further, it is created by sharing a common goal. His student, Morton Deutsch, expanded on the social interdependence theory during his work on conflict resolution. Deutsch studied how the "tension systems" of different people within a group might be interrelated. Deutsch conceptualized the three types of interdependence: positive, negative, and none.

A basic premise of social interdependence theory centers on the participant's goal structure which determines how they interact with one another. Other important variables for success include personal predisposition or cognitive bias. and training in social cooperation and collaboration techniques.

The social dominance theory is considered to be the opposite of social interdependence theory.

== Cooperative and collaborative learning ==
David Johnson, Deutsch's student in the study of social psychology, with his brother Roger Johnson, a science educator, and their sister, educator Edye Johnson Holubec, further developed positive interdependence theory as part of their research and work in teacher and professional training at the Cooperative Learning Center at the University of Minnesota (founded in 1969).

Johnson, Johnson, and Holubek identify positive interdependence as the first essential element for successful cooperative learning. Positive interdependence (cooperation) results in promotive interaction where individuals encourage and facilitate teammates' efforts to complete the task. Negative interdependence (competition) encourages contrient interaction where team members work to oppose or block the success of others on their team while working to further their own, individual goals. Interpersonal interaction alone does not increase productivity or lead to higher achievement in learning groups; instead, positive interdependence is needed to produce those results.

Johnson and Johnson structure interdependence using overlapping methods in three broad categories: Outcome interdependence includes the structure of goals and rewards. Means interdependence distributes roles, resources, and tasks in such a way that sharing is necessary in order to achieve a goal. Boundary interdependence defines discontinuities that segregate groups from one another while also serving to unify the individuals within each group. "Discontinuity can be created by environmental factors (groups separated around a room or in different rooms), similarity (all seated together or wearing the same shirt), expectations of being grouped together, and differentiation from other groups."

== Strategies ==
=== Common practices to facilitate it ===
Joint rewards, divided resources, and complementary roles are effective methods of facilitating positive interdependence. An example of a joint reward would be if everyone on the team received a bonus if all team members reach a specified score on a test. Dividing resources and roles among team members will force the participants to share their individual information or tool to achieve a common goal, and thus promote positive interdependence.

=== Categories ===
Positive interdependence strategies can be categorized into four major groups:

- Positive Goal Interdependence
- Positive Resource Interdependence
- Positive Role Interdependence
- Positive Identity Interdependence

Positive Goal Interdependence is achieved when learners share the same goals and perceive that group cooperation is essential in achieving these goals. Positive Resource Interdependence divvies up the resources or materials for completing the task by giving each group member an essential piece of the puzzle and makes it essential for the group to share resources or put their puzzle pieces together in order to be successful. And Positive Role Interdependence imparts a sense of ownership for each group member by assigning an interconnected role for each individual that is vital in completing the learning project. And Positive Identity Interdependence infuses unity and cohesion, inspiring camaraderie and loyalty by way of a shared identity expressed through a mutual logo, motto, name, etc.

== In CSCL ==
Computer-supported collaborative learning, or CSCL, offers strategies to promote positive interdependence by giving learning groups the technology to facilitate cooperative interaction through computer networks and achieve knowledge building through collaborative environments that support asynchronous and synchronous communication. Technology tools provide learner groups the means to share knowledge, construct shared understanding, and achieve deeper learning outcomes. Moreover, CSCL provides a framework to boost learner participation and has been shown to greatly improve learner engagement due to its social nature and adherence to constructivist learning principles.

Specific strategy examples to create positive interdependence include leveraging CSCL technologies such as augmented reality role playing and computer games Augmented reality role playing utilizes an emotionally compelling virtual world that allows group members to assume identities and create a sense of interdependence. This augmented reality provides an environment for learners to rely on each other for completing real world tasks in various roles such as investigators, scientists, and fantasy personas (alternate reality game). By designing learning projects that require role play and collaborative problem solving, CSCL builds positive identity and goal interdependence. Computer games can also be designed to promote positive interdependence by designing software tools that harness themes such as resource, role, and task interdependencies. A strategy for resource interdependence is to design learning games where no group member has all of the information to complete the task. Each member receives an essential piece or partial resource, and is forced to interact in order to be successful, as seen in games like Chase the Cheese and TeamQuest. For role interdependence, educational projects assign specific roles to each group member with specific responsibilities that are interchangeable and interconnected. And, to ensure interdependency, software tools are sequential, requiring each group member to complete part of the task in order to progress through the next phase.

== Benefits and limitations ==
When team members are positively interdependent they share common goals and thus support each other's efforts. This group dynamic has numerous benefits for the individual learner and the team.

=== Individual benefits ===
- Individuals trust other members and make sure they act in trustworthy ways themselves. This sense of trust and responsibility does not only help individuals develop personally but it also acts as glue that holds the team together.
- Positive interdependence intrinsically motivates individuals to try harder because they know that their teammates are dependent on them.
- It fosters high level critical thinking and reasoning strategies.
- It leads to greater long term retention of what is learned and increases the members willingness to take on more challenging tasks.
- It gives individuals the opportunity to hear a variety of insights and perspectives.
- Comparison and contrasting of others reasoning, opinions and conclusions helps promote higher quality decision making, better problem solving and also increases creativity.
- Individuals have low amount of anxiety and stress when performing in a group that is positively interdependent.
- Positive interdependence has a favorable impact on the psychological health and the self-esteem of an individual.

=== Team benefits ===
- An individual's performance affects the performance of the group, which creates a responsibility force that increases one's effort to achieve. Thus, positive interdependence helps in the attainment of the group goal by making every member personally responsible for the team's success.
- Positive interdependence increases achievement and productivity of the team as a whole.
- It leads to the development of more discoveries as compared to competitive or individualistic learning approaches.
- Within positively interdependent groups, conflicts have positive outcomes, such as higher achievement, respect for other's perspectives, more integrative agreements, greater liking for each other and positive attitudes towards conflicts.
- Positive relations and social support are formed between members from different ethnic background, culture, language, social class, ability and gender groups.

=== Limitations ===
- The biggest limitation of the positive interdependence theory is that it assumes people with different experiences, backgrounds, opinions, and ideals will all be willing to come to a consensus. It does not take into consideration real life situations and challenges such as non-cooperative members, untrustworthy individuals, slowly emerging roles and influential leaders, etc...
- Being a member of a group is not sufficient. There has to be positive interdependence among all the group members. Imbalance of positive interdependence can lead to failure in achievement of the goal or even to the dissolution of the team. If there is failure, blame is also shared.
- Constructive controversy or conflicts occur when group members have different information, perceptions, opinions, theories, willingness to take risks, and they need to reach to one conclusion. In positive interdependence conflicts occur not because of the final goals but over how best to achieve those mutual goals.
- Application of positive interdependence in teaching is very demanding on the part of a teacher. Just putting students in groups and asking them to work together may not be sufficient to achieve positive interdependence among them. The teacher needs to explain the task and the concept and structure collaborative activities in order to promote positive interdependence. Group work does not imply positive interdependence.
- Too much positive interdependence may eventually lead to social dependence.
- Positive interdependence neglects the benefits of healthy competition.
- Positive interdependence in computer-supported collaborative learning is hard to achieve as it is difficult to create shared understanding when people are distant and come from diverse backgrounds, cultural values and norms.
