= Chomeur =

Chômeur is French for unemployed person. It may also refer to:

- Chômeur, a grammatical term to describe an element of a sentence that has been "demoted"
- Pouding chômeur, a dessert from Quebec
- Tichumaren or Tishoumaren, a style of music in Northern Africa
