= Paul Postal =

American linguist

Paul Martin Postal (born November 10, 1936, in Weehawken, New Jersey) is an American linguist.

== Biography ==
Postal received a BA in Anthropology and Philosophy in 1957 from Columbia College, and a PhD in Anthropology from Yale University in 1963. He taught at MIT until 1965, after which he moved to the City University of New York. In 1967 he was appointed to a research position at IBM and remained on their research staff until 1994.

An important figure in the early development of generative grammar, he became a proponent of the generative semantics movement along with George Lakoff, James D. McCawley, and Haj Ross. In the 1970s, with David M. Perlmutter, he developed Relational Grammar. Later, with David E. Johnson, he developed Arc Pair Grammar. These non-transformational theories of grammar have had an indirect but major impact on modern syntactic analysis.

Since his involvement with generative semantics, he has been a vocal critic of Noam Chomsky and work done in Chomsky's frameworks.

== Selected bibliography ==
- Postal, Paul M. (1968). Aspects of phonological theory. New York: Harper & Row. ISBN 978-0-06-045248-3
- Postal, Paul M. (1972). "The best theory". In S. Peters (Ed.), Goals of linguistic theory. Englewood Cliffs, NJ: Prentice-Hall. ISBN 978-0-13-357095-3
- Postal, Paul M. (1974) On Raising: One Rule of English Grammar and Its Theoretical Implications. Cambridge: MIT Press. ISBN 978-0-26-266041-9
- Johnson, David E.; & Postal, Paul M. (1980). Arc pair grammar. Princeton: Princeton University Press. ISBN 978-0-608-03341-9
- Culicover, P. W., & Postal, Paul M. (2000). Parasitic gaps. Cambridge, Mass: MIT Press. ISBN 978-0-262-03284-1
- Postal, Paul M. (2003). "Policing the Content of Linguistic Examples". Language. 79 (1), 182–188.
- Postal, Paul M. Skeptical linguistic essays (Oxford University Press, US, 2004). ISBN 978-0-19-516671-2
