= Harold Barwick =

Personal information
- Full name: Harold G. H. Barwick

Senior career*
Years	Team	Apps	(Gls)
19??–1934	YMCA	?	(?)

Managerial career
- 1950: Australia
- 1951: Australia
- * Club domestic league appearances and goals

Harold G. H. Barwick (fl. 1930) was an association football player and manager.

He played for YMCA in Brisbane during his playing career, and captained the side from 1930 until his retirement in 1934.

In 1950, he was manager of the Australian national team for one game against a Western Australian representative side, with D. T. Johnston. The match ended in a 5–1 win for Australia. He managed Australia for another game, on his own, against an England FA side in 1951, which his team lost 1–4.

In 1958, he was the manager of the Australia B side on a ten match tour of New Zealand. The side played two test matches against New Zealand and the remaining games against regional representative teams.
