= Four corners (teaching method) =

The Four Corners is one of many cooperative teaching and learning strategies. This activity is used when a teacher wants to show that not everyone in the class has the same viewpoint or that there are multiple solutions to some problems. This teaching method allows students who would not normally communicate in class to participate and communicate with their peers. This strategy encourages students to formulate their own opinions on a given topic and allows them to contribute their ideas to class discussion.

== Process ==
First, the four corners of the class are labeled, either with a chart or a vignette. Each corner will have an opinion, written statements, etc. Second, the teacher poses a question or a problem to the class. The students reflect on the question without discussion. Third, the teacher invites the students to take a place at a corner that suits their opinion best by announcing "Corner". Then, the students at each corner share their views, either in pairs or with the whole group gathered at that corner.

Lastly, the teacher asks the students to be ready to share their ideas, reflections, lessons, plans, and opinions with the whole class.

== Critique ==
Four corners is a collaborative method of teaching and learning that aims to help learners think at a higher level, reflect on what they have learned in class, voice opinions safely, learn to critique on various issues, evaluate solutions, and communicate more effectively. This strategy also aims to enhances the responsibility of a learner when making a conclusion or opinion. The overarching goal of the Four corners method is to foster active engagement and encourage students to consider diverse perspectives. Existing research on the topic has shown some success, but it's applicability at scale is uncertain. Studies on the four corners teaching method that have been conducted have had small sample sizes. Other teaching methods have had more studies conducted demonstrating some success in a meta-analysis by Donoghue & Hattie (2021).
