= Chômeur =

Syntactic category

The chômeur, in the context of grammar, is an element of a sentence that has been syntactically "demoted" from the nucleus to the periphery of a clause. The term comes from the French word for "unemployed". In a passive sentence, the agent is a chômeur, having been "demoted" from the central or nuclear function of subject. For instance, by changing the sentence Dogs attack the postman into The postman is attacked by dogs, one transforms "dogs" into a chômeur. The concept was introduced and used extensively in relational grammar; however, the term is rarely used outside of this framework. The term was suggested by the linguist Colette Craig.

== See also ==
- Arc pair grammar

== Sources ==
- Perlmutter, David M. (Ed.). (1983). Studies in relational grammar 1. Chicago: Chicago University Press.
