= David Johnson (Michigan jurist) =

American judge (1809–1886)

David Johnson (October 20, 1809 – April 28, 1886) was an American jurist, legislator, and lawyer.

Born in Sangerfield, New York, Johnson studied law in New York and was admitted to the New York bar. In 1838, Johnson settled in Jackson, Michigan and continued to practice law. He served as school inspector and district attorney. From 1846 to 1850, Johnson served as Jackson County, Michigan circuit court judge and was a Democrat. In 1845 and 1847, Johnson served in the Michigan House of Representatives. From 1852 to 1857, Johnson served on the Michigan Supreme Court. In 1864, Johnson was defeated in a Congressional election race. Johnson continued to practice law. Johnson died at his house in Jackson, Michigan.
