= David E. Johnston =

British classical archaeologist & lecturer

David E Johnston is a classical archaeologist and former lecturer at the University of Southampton. His excavations have included the Sparsholt Roman Villa, and he has authored numerous books and research papers on Roman archaeology, art and mosaics from the 1960s to the 2010s.

His works include Roman Villas, Discovering Roman Britain, An Illustrated History of Roman Roads in Britain, and The Sparsholt Roman Villa.
