= David Johnston (soldier) =

American Civil War soldier

David H. Johnston
- Born: August 19, 1838; Indiana County, Pennsylvania
- Died: September 12, 1931 (aged 93); Central City, Nebraska
- Burial place: Pierce Chapel Bureau Cemetery, Clarks, Nebraska
- Spouse: Nancy Jane (m.1872)
- Children: Eight
- Military career
- Allegiance: United States of America
- Branch: Union Army
- Rank: Private
- Units: Company K, 8th Missouri Infantry Regiment
- Conflicts: Battle of Vicksburg, Mississippi
- Awards: Medal of Honor

David H. Johnston (August 19, 1838 – September 12, 1931) was an American soldier and recipient of the Medal of Honor for his actions in the American Civil War.

== Biography ==
Johnston was born in Indiana County, Pennsylvania on August 19, 1838, to David Johnston and Margaret Johnston. He served as a private in Company K of the 8th Missouri Infantry Regiment during the American Civil War. He earned his medal in action at the Battle of Vicksburg, Mississippi on May 22, 1863. Johnston received his medal on August 16, 1884, but the U.S. War Department mistakenly listed the recipient of the award as David A. Johnston from Missouri in their files. The mix-up happened after A. Johnston's pension check was mistaken by the War Department for H. Johnston's pension check, who had not applied for a pension that year. Johnston only requested a pension in 1907. The mistake was discovered in 1966 when a newspaper published a list of recipients and Johnston was absent. Johnston married Nancy Jane in 1872. The couple had eight children. Johnston died on September 12, 1931, in Central City Merrick County, Nebraska and is now buried in Pierce Chapel Bureau Cemetery, Clarks, Nebraska.

== Legacy ==
Johnson and other Nebraska associated Medal of Honor recipients were inducted into the Nebraska Hall of Fame in the 1970s and a Medal of Honor memorial gravestone was placed at Johnston's grave on Sunday, October 25, 1992, in a large family gathering to dedicate Johnston's life. His medal is also on display at the Merrick County Historical Society Museum.

== Medal of Honor Citation ==
For gallantry in the charge of the volunteer storming party on 22 May 1863, in action at Vicksburg, Mississippi.
