= David Johnson (cricketer, born 1944) =

English cricketer

Personal information
- Full name: David Johnson
- Born: 23 August 1944 (age 82); Stamford, Lincolnshire, England
- Batting: Right-handed

Domestic team information
- Years: Team
- 1965–1967: Lincolnshire

Career statistics
Competition	List A
Matches	2
Runs scored	42
Batting average	21.00
100s/50s	–/–
Top score	35
Balls bowled	–
Wickets	–
Bowling average	–
5 wickets in innings	–
10 wickets in match	–
Best bowling	–
Catches/stumpings	2/–
- Source: Cricinfo, 24 June 2011

David Johnson (born 23 August 1944) is a former English cricketer. Johnson was a right-handed batsman. He was born in Dowsby, Lincolnshire.

Johnson made his debut for Lincolnshire in the 1965 Minor Counties Championship against Shropshire. Johnson played Minor counties cricket for Lincolnshire from 1965 to 1967, which included 15 Minor Counties Championship appearances. He made his List A debut against Hampshire in the 1966 Gillette Cup. In this match he scored 16 runs, before being dismissed by Alan Wassell. He played a further List A match against the same opposition in the 1967 Gillette Cup. Opening the batting, he was dismissed for 7 runs by Derek Shackleton.
