= Dave Johnston Coal Plant =

Coordinates: 42°50′18″N 105°46′37″W

Dave Johnston Coal Plant is a coal-fired power plant near Glenrock, Wyoming, U.S. It is owned by PacifiCorp, parent company of Rocky Mountain Power. PacifiCorp is attempting to demonstrate new technology that can achieve emissions-free coal burning at this location starting in 2025.
