= D. T. Johnston =

Australian sportsman and local politician (1889–1953)

- Official Lake Macquarie Shire portrait of Johnston

President of Lake Macquarie Shire
- In office 1927–1930
- In office 1934–1937
- In office 1941–1942
- In office 1949–1950

Lake Macquarie Shire councillor
- In office c. 1915–1927
- In office 1930–1934
- In office 1937–1941
- In office 1942–1949

Northern District British Football Association secretary
- In office 19??–19??

Australian Football Association representative for Northern New South Wales
In office
19?? – 20 May, 1953
Association football career
Senior career*
Years	Team	Apps	(Gls)
19??–19??	West Wallsend	?	(?)
International career
19??–19??	New South Wales	?	(?)
Managerial career
- 1950: Australia
- * Club domestic league appearances and goals
- Cricket career

Cricket information
- Role: Batsman, Wicket-keeper

Domestic team information
- Years: Team
- 19??–19??: Boolaroo Club

Personal details
- Born: David Thomas Johnston; 1889 Bulli, New South Wales
- Died: 20 May 1953 (aged 64) Royal Newcastle Hospital, Newcastle, New South Wales

David Thomas Johnston (sometimes spelt Johnstone; 1889 – 20 May 1953) was an Australian sportsman and local politician.

== Early and personal life ==
Johnston was born in 1889 in Bulli, New South Wales to Isabella and John, and moved to Cardiff at the age of nine. He worked in the Newcastle Electric Supply Department for 40 years, and at one point was its commercial superintendent.

== Football ==
Johnston played for West Wallsend and was a foundation member of the Cardiff Soccer Football Club. He played for the New South Wales representative team multiple times throughout his career. After his playing days, he moved into football management and administration. At one point, he was secretary of the Northern District British Football Association, and represented Northern New South Wales in the Australian Football Association until his death. He was also director of the New South Wales Soccer Football Association. In 1950, he was manager of the Australia national soccer team for one game against a Western Australian representative side, with Harold Barwick. The match ended in a 5–1 win for Australia.

== Cricket ==
Johnston played cricket, mainly as a batsman and wicket-keeper, for the Boolaroo Club. He was the team's vice-captain in 1912, and captained the side in 1920. He was also listed as a patron of the Cardiff Cricket Club at the time of his death.

== Lake Macquarie Shire ==
Johnston was a member of the Lake Macquarie Shire council for about 35 years, from approximately 1915 to 1950, when he did not seek reelection. He served as the shire's president for seven terms in four stints, from 1927 to 1930, from 1934 to 1937, from 1941 to 1942, and from 1949 to 1950.

== Death ==
Johnston died at the age of 64 in the Royal Newcastle Hospital in Newcastle, New South Wales.
