= David E. Johnson =

American linguist

David E. Johnson (born December 21, 1946, in Princeton, New Jersey) is an American linguist. He is the co-inventor of arc pair grammar.

== Work ==
Johnson is best known for his work on relational grammar, especially the development with Paul Postal in 1977 of arc pair grammar.

In the late 1990s, Johnson and Shalom Lappin published the first detailed critiques of Noam Chomsky's Minimalist program. This work was followed by a lively debate with proponents of minimalism on the scientific status of the program

== Sources ==
- Johnson, David E. (1974/1979). Toward a Theory of Relationally-based Grammar. Outstanding Dissertations in Linguistics Series, ed. Jorge Hankamer. NY: Garland Publishing, Inc. ISBN 978-0-8240-9682-3
- Newmeyer, Frederick (1980). Linguistics in America. New York: Academic Press. ISBN 978-90-277-1290-5
