= Passive voice =

Grammatical construction

A passive voice construction is a grammatical voice construction that is found in many languages. In a clause with passive voice, the grammatical subject expresses the theme or patient of the main verb – that is, the person or thing that undergoes the action or has its state changed. This contrasts with active voice, in which the subject has the agent role. For example, in the passive sentence "The tree was pulled down", the subject (the tree) denotes the patient rather than the agent of the action. In contrast, the sentences "Someone pulled down the tree" and "The tree is down" are active sentences.

Typically, in passive clauses, what is usually expressed by the object (or sometimes another argument) of the verb is now expressed by the subject, while what is usually expressed by the subject is either omitted or is indicated by some adjunct of the clause. Thus, turning an active sense of a verb into a passive sense is a valence-decreasing process ("detransitivizing process"), because it syntactically turns a transitive sense into an intransitive sense. This is not always the case; for example in Japanese a passive-voice construction does not necessarily decrease valence.

Many languages have both an active and a passive voice; this allows for greater flexibility in sentence construction, as either the semantic agent or patient may take the syntactic role of subject. The use of passive voice allows speakers to organize stretches of discourse by placing figures other than the agent in subject position. This may be done to foreground the patient, recipient, or other thematic role; it may also be useful when the semantic patient is the topic of on-going discussion. The passive voice may also be used to avoid specifying the agent of an action.

== Passive marking ==
Different languages use various grammatical forms to indicate passive voice.

In some languages, passive voice is indicated by verb conjugation, specific forms of the verb. Examples of languages that indicate voice through conjugation include Greek, Latin, and North Germanic languages such as Swedish.

Voice	Latin	Swedish	Meaning
Passive	Vīnum ā servō portātur.	Vinet bärs av tjänaren.	"The wine is carried by the waiter."
Active	Servus vīnum portat.	Tjänaren bär vinet.	"The waiter carries the wine."

Norwegian (Nynorsk) and Icelandic have a similar system, but the usage of the passive is more restricted. The passive forms in Nynorsk are restricted to being accompanied by an auxiliary verb, which is not the case in Swedish and Danish.

Nynorsk uses "å verte" or "å bli" + past participle for passive voice, and Swedish and Danish use the passive suffix "-s" and Icelandic uses "að verða" or "að vera" + past participle or "-st" suffix for middle voice.

In Latin, the agent of a passive sentence (if indicated) is expressed using a noun in the ablative case, in this case servō (the ablative of servus). Different languages use different methods for expressing the agent in passive clauses. In Swedish, the agent can be expressed by means of a prepositional phrase with the preposition av (equivalent here to the English "by").

The Austronesian language Kimaragang Dusun also indicates passive voice by verb conjugation using the infix, ⟨in⟩.

Other languages, including English, express the passive voice periphrastically, using an auxiliary verb.

=== In English ===
English, like some other languages, uses a periphrastic passive. Rather than conjugating directly for voice, English uses the past participle form of the verb plus an auxiliary verb, either be or get (called linking verbs in traditional grammar), to indicate passive voice.

- The money was donated to the school.
- The vase got broken during the fight.
- All men are created equal.

If the agent is mentioned, it usually appears in a prepositional phrase introduced by the preposition by.

- Without agent: The paper was marked.
- With agent: The paper was marked by Mr. Tan.

The subject of the passive voice usually corresponds to the direct object of the corresponding active-voice formulation (as in the above examples), but English also allows passive constructions in which the subject corresponds to an indirect object or preposition complement:

- We were given tickets. (subject we corresponds to the indirect object of give)
- Tim was operated on yesterday. (subject Tim corresponds to the complement of the preposition on)

In sentences of the second type, a stranded preposition is left. This is called the prepositional passive or pseudo-passive (although the latter term can also be used with other meanings).

The active voice is the dominant voice used in English. Many commentators, notably George Orwell in his essay "Politics and the English Language" and Strunk & White in The Elements of Style, have urged minimizing use of the passive voice, but this is almost always based on these commentators' misunderstanding of what the passive voice is. Contrary to common critiques, the passive voice has important uses, with virtually all writers using the passive voice (including Orwell and Strunk & White). There is general agreement that the passive voice is useful for emphasis or when the receiver of the action is more important than the actor.

Merriam–Webster's Dictionary of English Usage refers to three statistical studies of passive versus active sentences in various periodicals, stating: "the highest incidence of passive constructions was 13 percent. Orwell runs to a little over 20 percent in "Politics and the English Language". Clearly he found the construction useful in spite of his advice to avoid it as much as possible".

== Defining "passive" ==
In the field of linguistics, the term passive is applied to a wide range of grammatical structures. Linguists therefore find it difficult to define the term in a way that makes sense across all human languages. The canonical passive in European languages has the following properties:

1. The subject is not an agent.
2. There is a change in: word order; or in nominal morphology—the form of the nouns in the sentence.
3. There is specific verbal morphology—a particular form of the verb indicates passive voice.

The problem arises with non-European languages. Many constructions in these languages share at least one property with the canonical European passive, but not all. While it seems justified to call these constructions passive when comparing them to European languages' passive constructions, as a whole the passives of the world's languages do not share a single common feature.

R. M. W. Dixon has defined four criteria for determining whether a construction is a passive:

1. It applies to underlying transitive clauses and forms a derived intransitive.
2. The entity that is the patient or the object of the transitive verb in the underlying representation (indicated as O in linguistic terminology) becomes the core argument of the clause (indicated as S, since the core argument is the subject of an intransitive).
3. The agent in the underlying representation (indicated as A) becomes a chômeur, a noun in the periphery that is not a core argument. It is marked by a non-core case or becomes part of an adpositional phrase, etc. This can be omitted, but there is always the option of including it.
4. There is some explicit marking of the construction.

Dixon acknowledges that this excludes some constructions labeled as passive by some linguists.

== Adversative passive ==
In some languages, including several Southeast Asian languages, the passive voice is sometimes used to indicate that an action or event was unpleasant or undesirable. This so-called adversative passive works like the ordinary passive voice in terms of syntactic structure—that is, a theme or instrument acts as subject. In addition, the construction indicates adversative affect, suggesting that someone was negatively affected.

In Japanese, for example, the adversative passive (also called indirect passive) indicates adversative affect. The indirect or adversative passive has the same form as the direct passive. Unlike the direct passive, the indirect passive may be used with intransitive verbs.

花子が 隣の 学生に ピアノを 朝まで 弾かれた。
Hanako-ga tonari-no gakusei-ni piano-o asa-made hika-re-ta.
Hanako-NOM neighbor-GEN student-DAT piano-ACC morning-until played-PASS-PFV
"Hanako was adversely affected by the neighboring student playing the piano until morning."

Yup'ik, from the Eskimo–Aleut family, has two different suffixes that can indicate passive, -cir- and -ma-. The morpheme -cir- has an adversative meaning. If an agent is included in a passive sentence with the -cir passive, the noun is usually in the allative (oblique) case.

neqe-rrluk yuku-cir-tu-q
fish-departed.from.natural.state be.moldy-get-IND.INTR-3sg
"That beautiful piece of dry fish got moldy."

== Stative and dynamic passive ==
In some languages, for example English, there is often a similarity between clauses expressing an action or event in the passive voice and clauses expressing a state. For example, the string of words "The dog is fed" can have the following two different meanings:

1. The dog is fed (twice a day).
2. The dog is fed (so we can leave now).

The additions in parentheses "force" the same string of words to clearly show only one of their two possible grammatical functions and the related meaning. In the first sentence, the combination of the auxiliary verb "is" and the past participle "fed" is a regular example of the construction of the passive voice in English. In the second sentence, "is" can however be interpreted as an ordinary copula and the past participle as an adjective.

Sentences of the second type are called false passives by some linguists, who feel that such sentences are simply confused with the passive voice due to their outward similarity. Other linguists consider the second type to be a different kind of passive – a stative passive (rarely called statal, static, or resultative passive), in contrast to the dynamic or eventive passive illustrated by the first sentence. Some languages express or can express these different meanings using different constructions.

The difference between dynamic and stative passives is more evident in languages such as German that use different words or constructions for the two. In German, the auxiliary verb sein marks static passive (German: Zustandspassiv, rarely statisches Passiv, in referring to German also called sein-Passiv or Sein-Passiv), while werden marks the dynamic passive (Vorgangspassiv or Handlungspassiv, rarely dynamisches Passiv, in referring to German also called werden-Passiv or Werden-Passiv or simply Passiv or Passivum). The English string of words "the lawn is mown" has two possible meanings corresponding to the example "the dog is fed" above. It can be used in the following two different senses:

1. dynamic: The lawn is mown (once a week).
2. stative: The lawn is mown (so they're probably not gone.)

German uses two different grammatical constructions for these sentences:

1. dynamic: Der Rasen wird (einmal pro Woche) gemäht.
2. stative: Der Rasen ist gemäht (also sind sie wahrscheinlich nicht verreist). (Note: Despite the superficial resemblance of "der Rasen ist gemäht" to the perfect tense construction of some intransitive German verbs in the active voice (e.g. er ist gekommen) and all verbs in the passive (e.g. der Rasen ist gemäht worden), "der Rasen ist [schon] gemäht" and the equivalent English sentence #2 (the lawn is [already] mown) are clearly present tense, not perfect tense. The English example could of course be rephrased to mean the same thing in the perfect tense as "the lawn has [already] been mown..." (der Rasen ist [schon] gemäht worden...), but it would be incorrect to label either the English original or its German equivalent as "perfect tense".)

Further examples and explanations:

1. dynamic: Der Rasen wird (gerade/oft) gemäht ("The lawn is being mown right now" / "The lawn is mown often", literally "The lawn gets mown right now / often", dynamic)
2. stative: Der Rasen ist (schon) gemäht. ("The lawn is [already] mown.")

A number of German verbs such as bedecken ("cover"), erfüllen ("fill"), and trennen ("separate"), when used as stative verbs, usually only form static passives.

- Schnee bedeckt die Erde ("Snow covers the ground", active)
- Die Erde ist mit Schnee bedeckt ("The ground is covered with snow", static)
- rare, poetic: Die Erde wird durch Schnee bedeckt ("The ground is being covered with snow", dynamic)
- but not: *Die Straße wird mit Trümmern bedeckt. (The English equivalent would be equally incorrect: *"The street is being covered with rubble.")
- correct: Die Straße ist mit Trümmern bedeckt. ("The street is covered with rubble.")

In English, the passive voice expressed with the auxiliary verb "get" rather than "be" ("get-passive") expresses a dynamic rather than a static meaning. But when the auxiliary verb "be" is used, the main verb can have either a dynamic or static meaning as shown below (including copies of some examples from above):

The dog gets fed twice a day. (dynamic)
The dog is fed (twice a day). (dynamic)
The dog is fed (so we can leave now). (stative)
The couple got married last spring. (dynamic)
The marriage was celebrated last spring. (dynamic)
It is agreed that laws were invented for the safety of citizens. (stative)

Verbs that typically express static meaning can show dynamic meaning when used in the passive formed with get, for example be known (static) vs. get known (dynamic):

Zoltan is known for hosting big parties. (static)
Get your foot in the door, get known. (dynamic)

== See also ==
- Impersonal verb
- List of common English usage misconceptions
