= Cooperative learning =

Educational approach which arranges students into cooperative groups

Cooperative learning is an educational approach which aims to organize classroom activities into academic and social learning experiences. There is much more to cooperative learning than merely arranging students into groups, and it has been described as "structuring positive interdependence." Students must work in groups to complete tasks collectively toward academic goals. Unlike individual learning, which can be competitive in nature, students learning cooperatively can capitalize on one another's resources and skills (asking one another for information, evaluating one another's ideas, monitoring one another's work, etc.). Furthermore, the teacher's role changes from giving information to facilitating students' learning. Everyone succeeds when the group succeeds. Ross and Smyth (1995) describe successful cooperative learning tasks as intellectually demanding, creative, open-ended, and involve higher-order thinking tasks. Cooperative learning has also been linked to increased levels of student satisfaction.

Five essential elements are identified for the successful incorporation of cooperative learning in the classroom:

- positive interdependence
- individual and group accountability
- promotive interaction (face to face)
- teaching the students the required interpersonal and small group skills
- group processing.

According to Johnson and Johnson's meta-analysis, students in cooperative learning settings compared to those in individualistic or competitive learning settings, achieve more, reason better, gain higher self-esteem, like classmates and the learning tasks more and have more perceived social support.

== History ==
Prior to World War II, social theorists such as Allport, Watson, Shaw, and Mead began establishing cooperative learning theory after finding that group work was more effective and efficient in quantity, quality, and overall productivity when compared to working alone. However, it wasn't until 1937 when researchers May and Doob found that people who cooperate and work together to achieve shared goals were more successful in attaining outcomes, than those who strived independently to complete the same goals. Furthermore, they found that independent achievers had a greater likelihood of displaying competitive behaviors.

Philosophers and psychologists in the 1930s and 1940s such as John Dewey, Kurt Lewin, and Morton Deutsh also influenced the cooperative learning theory practiced today. Dewey believed it was important that students develop knowledge and social skills that could be used outside of the classroom, and in the democratic society. This theory portrayed students as active recipients of knowledge by discussing information and answers in groups, engaging in the learning process together rather than being passive receivers of information (e.g., teacher talking, students listening).

Lewin's contributions to cooperative learning were based on the ideas of establishing relationships between group members in order to successfully carry out and achieve the learning goal. Deutsh's contribution to cooperative learning was positive social interdependence, the idea that the student is responsible for contributing to group knowledge.

Since then, David and Roger Johnson have been actively contributing to the cooperative learning theory. In 1975, they identified that cooperative learning promoted mutual liking, better communication, high acceptance and support, as well as demonstrated an increase in a variety of thinking strategies among individuals in the group. Students who showed to be more competitive lacked in their interaction and trust with others, as well as in their emotional involvement with other students.

In 1994 Johnson and Johnson published the five elements (positive interdependence, individual accountability, face-to-face interaction, social skills, and processing) essential for effective group learning, achievement, and higher-order social, personal and cognitive skills (e.g., problem solving, reasoning, decision-making, planning, organizing, and reflecting).

== Theoretical base ==
Social interdependence theory: Social interdependence exists when the outcomes of individuals are affected by their own and others' actions. There are two types of social interdependence: positive (when the actions of individuals promote the achievement of joint goals) and negative (when the actions of individuals obstruct the achievement of each other's goals). Social interdependence may be differentiated from social dependence, independence, and helplessness. Social dependence exists when the goal achievement of Person A is affected by Person B's actions, but the reverse is not true. Social independence exists when the goal achievement of Person A is unaffected by Person B's actions and vice versa. Social helplessness exists when neither the person nor other can influence goal achievement.

Kurt Lewin proposed that the essence of a group is the interdependence among members that results in the group being a dynamic whole so that a change in the state of any member or subgroup changes the state of any other member or subgroup. Group members are made interdependent through common goals. As members perceive their common goals, a state of tension arises that motivates movement toward the accomplishment of the goals.

Morton Deutsch extended Lewin's notions by examining how the tension systems of different people may be interrelated. He conceptualized two types of social interdependence—positive and negative. Positive interdependence exists when there is a positive correlation among individuals' goal attainments; individuals perceive that they can attain their goal if and only if the other individuals with whom they are cooperatively linked attain their goals. Positive interdependence results in promotive interaction. Negative interdependence exists when there is a negative correlation among individuals' goal achievements; individual perceive that they can obtain their goals if and only if the other individuals with whom they are competitively like fail to obtain their goals. Negative interdependence results in oppositional or content interaction. No interdependence exists when there is no correlation among individuals' goal achievements; individuals perceive that the achievement of their goals is unrelated to the goal achievement of others. The basic premise of social interdependence theory is that how participants' goals are structured determines the ways they interact and the interaction pattern determine the outcomes of the situation.

== Types ==
Formal cooperative learning is structured, facilitated, and monitored by the educator over time and is used to achieve group goals in task work (e.g. completing a unit). Any course material or assignment can be adapted to this type of learning, and groups can vary from 2-6 people with discussions lasting from a few minutes up to an entire period. Types of formal cooperative learning strategies include:

1. The jigsaw technique
2. Assignments that involve group problem-solving and decision making
3. Laboratory or experiment assignments
4. Peer review work (e.g. editing writing assignments).

Having experience and developing skill with this type of learning often facilitates informal and base learning. Jigsaw activities are wonderful because the student assumes the role of the teacher on a given topic and is in charge of teaching the topic to a classmate. The idea is that if students can teach something, they have already learned the material.

Informal cooperative learning incorporates group learning with passive teaching by drawing attention to material through small groups throughout the lesson or by discussion at the end of a lesson, and typically involves groups of two (e.g. turn-to-your-partner discussions). These groups are often temporary and can change from lesson to lesson (very much unlike formal learning where 2 students may be lab partners throughout the entire semester contributing to one another's knowledge of science).

Discussions typically have four components that include formulating a response to questions asked by the educator, sharing responses to the questions asked with a partner, listening to a partner's responses to the same question, and creating a new well-developed answer. This type of learning enables the student to process, consolidate, and retain more information.

In group-based cooperative learning, these peer groups gather together over the long term (e.g. over the course of a year, or several years such as in high school or post-secondary studies) to develop and contribute to one another's knowledge mastery on a topic by regularly discussing material, encouraging one another, and supporting the academic and personal success of group members.

Base group learning (e.g., a long-term study group) is effective for learning complex subject matter over the course or semester and establishes caring, supportive peer relationships, which in turn motivates and strengthens the student's commitment to the group's education while increasing self-esteem and self-worth. Base group approaches also make the students accountable to educating their peer group in the event that a member was absent for a lesson. This is effective both for individual learning, as well as social support.

== Elements ==
Johnson and Johnson (2009) posited five variables that mediate the effectiveness of cooperation. Brown & Ciuffetelli Parker (2009) and Siltala (2010) discuss the 5 basic and essential elements to cooperative learning: The first element is positive interdependence. Students must fully participate and put forth effort within their group, and each group member has a task, role or responsibility, therefore must believe that they are responsible for their learning and that of their group. The second element is face-to-face promotive interaction. Members must promote each other's success, and students explain to one another what they have or are learning and assist one another with understanding and completion of assignments. The third element is individual and group accountability. Each student must demonstrate mastery of the content being studied and each student is accountable for their learning and work, therefore eliminating social loafing. The fourth element is social skills, which must be taught in order for successful cooperative learning to occur. The skills include effective communication and interpersonal and group skills. For example, leadership, decision-making, trust-building, friendship-development, communication, and conflict-management skills. The fifth element is group processing. Group processing occurs when group members reflect on which member actions were helpful and make decisions about which actions to continue or change. The purpose of group processing is to clarify and improve the effectiveness with which members carry out the processes necessary to achieve the group's goals.

In order for student achievement to improve considerably, two characteristics must be present. Firstly, when designing cooperative learning tasks and reward structures, individual responsibility and accountability must be identified. Individuals must know exactly what their responsibilities are and that they are accountable to the group in order to reach their goal. Secondly, all group members must be involved in order for the group to complete the task. In order for this to occur each member must have a task that they are responsible for which cannot be completed by any other group member.

== Techniques ==
There are a great number of cooperative learning techniques available. Some cooperative learning techniques utilize student pairing, while others utilize small groups of four or five students. Hundreds of techniques have been created into structures to use in any content area. Among the easy to implement structures are think-pair-share, think-pair-write, variations of Round Robin, and the reciprocal teaching technique. A well known cooperative learning technique is the Jigsaw, Jigsaw II and Reverse Jigsaw. Educators should think of critical thinking, creative thinking and empathetic thinking activities to give students in pairs and work together.

=== Think-pair-share ===
Originally developed by Frank T. Lyman (1981), think-pair-share allows students to contemplate a posed question or problem silently. The student may write down thoughts or simply just brainstorm in his or her head. When prompted, the student pairs up with a peer and discusses his or her ideas and then listens to the ideas of his or her partner. Following pair dialogue, the teacher solicits responses from the whole group. Teachers using this technique don't have to worry about students not volunteering because each student will already have an idea in their heads; therefore, the teacher can call on anyone and increase discussion productivity.

=== Jigsaw ===
Students are members of two groups: home group and expert group. In the heterogeneous home group, students are each assigned a different topic. Once a topic has been identified, students leave the home group and group with the other students with their assigned topic. In the new group, students learn the material together before returning to their home group. Once back in their home group, each student is accountable for teaching his or her assigned topic.

==== Jigsaw II ====
Jigsaw II is Robert Slavin's (1980) variation of Jigsaw in which members of the home group are assigned the same material, but focus on separate portions of the material. Each member must become an "expert" on his or her assigned portion and teach the other members of the home group.

==== Reverse jigsaw ====
This variation was created by Timothy Hedeen (2003) It differs from the original Jigsaw during the teaching portion of the activity. In the Reverse Jigsaw technique, students in the expert groups teach the whole class rather than return to their home groups to teach the content.

=== Inside-outside circle ===
The inside-outside circle is a cooperative learning strategy in which students form two concentric circles and take turns on rotation to face new partners to answer or discuss the teacher's questions. This method can be used to gather a variety of information, generate new ideas and solve problems.

=== Reciprocal teaching ===
Brown and Paliscar (1982) developed reciprocal teaching, which — as currently practiced — pertains to the form of guided, cooperative learning that features a collaborative learning setting between learning leaders and listeners; expert scaffolding by an adult teacher; and direct instruction, modeling, and practice in the use of simple strategies that facilitate a dialogue structure.

In a model that allows for student pairs to participate in a dialogue about text, partners take turns reading and asking questions of each other, receiving immediate feedback. This approach enables students to use important metacognitive techniques such as clarifying, questioning, predicting, and summarizing. It embraces the idea that students can effectively learn from each other. There are empirical studies that show the efficacy of reciprocal teaching even in subjects such as mathematics. For instance, it was found that children who were taught using this strategy showed higher levels of accuracy in mathematical computations in comparison with those who were not. The same success has been obtained in the cases of students learning in diverse situations such as those with learning disabilities and those who are at risk of academic failure, among others. These studies also cover learners from elementary to college levels.

=== The Williams ===
Students collaborate to answer a big question that is the learning objective. Each group has differentiated questions that increase in cognitive demands to allow students to progress and meet the learning objective.

=== Student-teams-achievement divisions ===
Students are placed in small groups (or teams). The class in its entirety is presented with a lesson and the students are subsequently tested. Individuals are graded on the team's performance. Although the tests are taken individually, students are encouraged to work together to improve the overall performance of the group.

=== Rally table ===
Rally table is another cooperative learning strategy. In this process, the class or the students are divided into groups. This is done to encourage group learning, team building and cooperative learning. It is the written version of Robin Table.

=== Team game tournament ===
In a team game tournament (TGT), students are placed into small groups to study and prepare for a trivia game. This gives students incentive to learn and have some fun learning the material. This is a group exercise so not one student is to blame.

TGT is an effective technique of cooperative learning wherein groups are created that function in the class for a period of time. In this technique the groups revise a portion of material before writing a written test. This motivates those students that have the fear of writing the test and to learn and reinforce what has been already learnt. This method is one of the learning strategies designed by Robert Slavin for the purpose of review and mastery in learning. This method was basically to increase student's skills, increase interaction and self-esteem between students. In this technique the students study in the class. The material is supplied and are taught in groups or individually through different activities. The students after receiving the material review it and then bring 2-6 points from their study into their assigned groups. Since the tournament is based on a material there is a specific answer.

The characteristics of TGT are that students are working in heterogeneous groups, that playing the games makes the students to move into homogeneous and higher level groups, and that they understand others' skills.

==== Method ====
The students compete in the tournament after a designated time to study by forming groups of 3-4 students where the stronger students compete with the weaker students and winner of the respective teams is moved to a high level team while the students who don't score well are moved to an easier level. This ensures that students of the same ability are competing with each other."

TGT enhances student cooperation and friendly competition which allows different students with different capabilities to work together and acquire mastery in the topics assigned to them. The students have the independence to have interactions with different students. The benefit of this activity is that it holds the students responsible for the preparation of the material. The advantages of TGT are that it involves students in higher-order learning and they become excited about learning, knowledge is obtained from the student rather than solely from the teacher, it fosters positive attitudes in the students (such as cooperation and tolerance), and it trains students to express or convey ideas. TGT is an effective tool to teach mathematics as it motivates and helps students acquire skills and mastery with the help of their peer and through healthy competition.

The disadvantages are that it is time consuming for new teachers, requires adequate facilities and infrastructure, and can create confusion in the classroom. It does not translate to college environment where study is individualistic and allows more voice to the dominant personality than individualistic study would. It leaves out slower students, and lowers their self esteem by constantly being dominated. It can create a classroom of behavior problems and allows noise in the classroom making it difficult for concentration. It creates a negative environment for high achievers, who may have a lowered grade if group doesn't participate well in the group work. Finally, the world already functions in groups, such as the police force and unions, without teaching collective study.

== Research evidence ==
Research is missing for Kagan structures. There are no peer-reviewed studies on Kagan structure learning outcomes. Research on cooperative learning demonstrated "overwhelmingly positive" results and confirmed that cooperative modes are cross-curricular. Cooperative learning requires students to engage in group activities that increase learning and adds other important dimensions. The positive outcomes include academic gains, improved race relations and increased personal and social development. Students who fully participate in group activities, exhibit collaborative behaviors, provide constructive feedback, and cooperate with their groups have a higher likelihood of receiving higher test scores and course grades at the end of the semester. Cooperative learning is an active pedagogy that fosters higher academic achievement. Cooperative learning has also been found to increase attendance, time on task, enjoyment of school and classes, motivation, and independence.

Benefits and applicability of cooperative learning are that students demonstrate academic achievement, the methods are usually equally effective for all ability levels, and it is effective for all ethnic groups. Student perceptions of each other are enhanced when given the opportunity to work with one another, it increases self-esteem and self-concept, and ethnic and disability barriers are broken down, allowing for positive interactions and friendships to occur. Cooperative learning results in increased higher level reasoning and generation of new ideas and solutions, and greater transfer of learning between situations.

In business, cooperative learning can be seen as a characteristic of innovative businesses. The five-stage division on cooperative learning creates a useful method of analyzing learning in innovative businesses, and innovation connected to cooperative learning seems to make the creation of innovations possible.

== Limitations and problems ==
Cooperative Learning has many limitations that could cause the process to be more complicated than first perceived. Sharan (2010) describes the constant evolution of cooperative learning as a threat. Because cooperative learning is constantly changing, there is a possibility that teachers may become confused and lack complete understanding of the method. The highly dynamic nature of cooperative learning means that it can not be used effectively in many situations. Also teachers can get into the habit of relying on cooperative learning as a way to keep students busy. While cooperative learning will consume time, the most effective application of cooperative learning hinges on an active instructor. Teachers implementing cooperative learning may also be challenged with resistance and hostility from students who believe that they are being held back by slower teammates or by students who are less confident and feel that they are being ignored or demeaned by their team.

Students often provide feedback in the form of evaluations or reviews on success of the teamwork experienced during cooperative learning experiences. Peer review and evaluations may not reflect true experiences due to perceived competition among peers. Students might feel pressured into submitting inaccurate evaluations due to bullying. Although assessment of groups can lead to inaccurate results, a study was done that found students who participated in groups that ended with self assessment performed significantly better than the groups who did not end with self assessment. To eliminate such concerns, confidential evaluation processes and individual performance evaluation may help to increase evaluation strength.

=== Group hate ===
Group hate is defined as "a feeling of dread that arises when facing the possibility of having to work in a group When students develop group hate their individual performance in the group suffers and in turn the group as a whole suffers. There are many factors that lead students to experience these feelings of group hate. The more crucial elements include past bad experiences, group fatigue due to overuse of cooperative learning and whether they prefer to work alone.

When students are given a choice between group based or individual work, they often evaluate several factors. The three most common factors are how likely they are to get a good grade, the difficulty of the task, and the amount of effort involved. Students will choose to do the work individually more often that not, because they feel that they can do a better job individually than as a group.

It is difficult to definitively identify which factors lead to a student forming group hate, as each group and individual is unique. However, there are several common concerns that lead to students developing group hate.

- Concerns about the teachers' role
- Concerns about the students' role
- Concerns about fairness and use of resources.

Concerns about the teachers' role usually stem from lack of communication from the teacher as to what exactly is expected of the group. It is difficult for a teacher to find the right balance between being overbearing, and not providing sufficient structure and oversight. While an experienced teacher may be able to strike the balance every time, most teachers tend to lean one way or the other which can cause confusion with the students. This is only amplified when the students are put into groups and asked to complete a project with insufficient instructions. The way a teacher chooses to structure a project can influence how a student perceives the project overall. Whether or not a student likes a teaching style or not can influence if they develop group hate.

The next concern that leads students to developing group hate is that students get sick of working with the same group members over and over again. Cooperative learning is becoming so common that students are beginning to develop group hate simply because they are doing too many group projects. Students express opinions such as, "so many group projects with the same people", and, "we are all up in each others business". While the building of personal relationships can be a positive aspect of cooperative learning, it can also be a negative if a person has to continually work with people who are constantly letting them down or who are difficult to work with. Unfortunately, it is common to have group members that exhibit signs of loafing within the group.

=== Loafing ===
Loafing is defined as "students who don't take responsibility for their own role, even if it is the smallest role in the group." Students expect that group based learning will be fair for everyone within the group. In order for cooperative learning to be fair the work load must be shared equally within the group. Many students fear that this will not take place. This leads to the students developing group hate.

The fear that some members of the group will act as passengers or social loafers and derive a benefit (generally a good grade) from the group activity undermines the effectiveness of the group. Some students hoard their intellectual capital to make sure that no one unjustly benefits from it. Ironically, some of the students most indignant about "slackers" or "freeloaders" make immediate assumptions about their peers and insist from the outset that they will have to take care of everything in order to maintain control. There are many ways for a concern about equity to warp the function of a group. Therefore, to make groups more effective, the most important thing an instructor can do to defuse student resistance to cooperative learning is to focus attention on the issue of "fairness."

In order for students not to develop group hate the instructors must be very aware of this process and take steps to insure that the project is fair. This can be a difficult task. It is often difficult to gauge which students are loafing while the project is taking place, unless other students in the group bring the problem to the attention of the instructor.

=== Over-reliance on the stronger students ===
Research has highlighted concerns that in a cooperative learning settings, some students may depend heavily on others in the group who have a stronger grasp of the materials. This dynamic can lead to loafing and also prevent the teacher from identifying areas where certain students struggle, as homework grades often reflect only the understanding of the better-performed students. To address this issue, some studies recommend designing assignments that incorporate both cooperative and individual components.

=== Assessment of groups ===
It is a common practice to have the groups self assess after the project is complete. However, "assessment can be the Achilles heel of cooperative learning". Students often will assess their group positively in hopes that they will in return be assessed the same way. This often leads to inaccurate assessments of the group. "For most instructors, one of the greatest pedagogical challenges for a group communication course is to help students realize that the benefits of cooperative learning outweigh the costs involved".

=== Group cohesion and conflict management ===
Another aspect of cooperative learning that leads to group members developing group hate is that "groups are unable to achieve sufficient cohesion because they fail to manage conflict effectively". The students are not usually in a group long enough to develop good group cohesion and establish effective ways to resolve conflict. The problem is that most students have had a negative experience in groups and consequently are apprehensive to get into such a situation again. "One answer to this dilemma is to demonstrate how groups trump individuals in terms of problem solving". If instructors are able to effectively accomplish this it is a positive step towards eliminating group hate.

Group hate exists in almost all student group, due to factors such as past bad experiences, concerns about how the project will play out, worries about others loafing, or not knowing how to effectively manage conflict that may arise within the group. However, group based learning is an important aspect of higher education and should continue to be used. More companies are turning towards team based models in order to become more efficient in the work place. Limiting student feelings of group hate leads to students having better group experiences and learning how to work better in groups.

Cooperative learning is becoming more and more popular within the American education system. It is almost uncommon not to have some cooperative learning elements within a college class. However, it is not uncommon to hear students expressing negative opinions regarding cooperative learning. Feichtner and Davis stated that this is because "entirely too many students are leaving the classroom experiencing only the frustrations of cooperative learning and not the numerous benefits possible through team based effort". One of the main flaws with previous research is that the research is almost always done from the perspective of the instructor, giving a flawed view as the instructors are not the ones who are participating in the cooperative learning.

From the (often blind) viewpoint of instructors, we had always viewed cooperative learning as an added advantage for the students – an opportunity to receive additional support while working closely with their peers. We had never really considered what a disastrous experience some frustrated students must endure, or why some students reported only positive experiences from classes utilizing group learning techniques.

== Competition in cooperative and individualistic efforts ==
There are many reasons why competitors tend to achieve less than they would if they were working cooperatively. There have also been many studies claiming cooperative learning is more effective than competitive learning and individualistic efforts. But studies also show that competition and individualistic efforts can be constructive and should be encouraged when they are appropriately structured. The conditions for constructive competition are that winning is relatively unimportant, all participants have a reasonable chance to win and there are clear and specific rules, procedures, and criteria for winning. The conditions for constructive individualistic efforts are: for cooperation to be too costly, difficult or cumbersome because of the unavailability of skilled potential co-operators or the unavailability of the resources need for cooperation to take place; for the goal to be perceived as important, relevant, and worthwhile; for the participants to expect that they will be successful in achieving their goals; for the directions for completing the tasks to be clear and specific, so participants can proceed and evaluate their work without further clarification; and for accomplishments to be used subsequently in a cooperative effort.

== See also ==
- 21st century skills
- Active learning
- Four corners (teaching method)
- Organizational learning
- Learning by teaching
- Learning environment
- Thesis circle
