= Morton Deutsch =

American social psychologist (1920–2017)

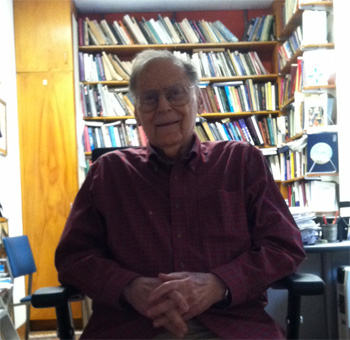
- Deutsch in his office, 2012
- Born: February 4, 1920; New York City, US
- Died: March 13, 2017 (aged 97); New York City, US
- Known for: Theories of cooperation and competition, conflict resolution, distributive justice

Academic background
- Education: City College of New York (BS); University of Pennsylvania (MS); Massachusetts Institute of Technology (PhD)
- Thesis: The effects of cooperation and competition upon group process (1948)
- Doctoral advisor: Ronald Lippitt
- Other advisor: Kurt Lewin

Morton Deutsch (February 4, 1920 – March 13, 2017) was an American social psychologist, psychoanalyst, and researcher in conflict resolution. Deutsch was one of the founding fathers of the field of conflict resolution. A Review of General Psychology survey, published in 2002, ranked Deutsch as the 63rd most cited psychologist of the 20th century.

== Early life and education ==
Morton Deutsch was born in 1920 in the Bronx, New York City, the fourth child of Charles and Ida Deutsch, Jewish immigrants from what is now Poland. By age 15, he was enrolled in university at the City College of New York. Deutsch started on a path into psychiatry, but switched to psychology after dissecting a guinea pig in a biology class. He received a B.S. from the City College of New York in 1939 and his M.A. in 1940, from the University of Pennsylvania. After his M.A. degree, Deutsch held a rotating internship that cycled between three New York State institutions: Letchworth Village (for the mentally incompetent), Warwick (for delinquent boys), and Rockland State Hospital (for mentally disturbed children and adults).

Deutsch joined the US Air Force after the Japanese attack on Pearl Harbor, where he initially acted as a psychologist, then as a navigator flying in thirty bombing missions over Nazi Germany. During active combat Deutsch was honored with a Distinguished Flying Cross (and cluster) and an Air Medal (with three clusters). After his tour of duty was completed he served as a clinical psychologist in an Air Force convalescent hospital until his discharge. Subsequently, he studied at MIT under Kurt Lewin, where he was graduated with a Ph.D. in 1948. He wrote his dissertation comparing the psychological effects and productivity of cooperative groups and competitive groups. Deutsch worked as a part of Lewin's Research Center for Group Dynamics, and his early research was largely tinged by the growing global concern with nuclear weapons. He was also tasked with instructing introductory psychology classes to undergraduate students, in which he undertook an experiment comparing cooperative and competitive grading processes.

This led to the major theoretical contribution Deutsch made during his early career; the "Theory of Cooperation and Competition", which studies interdependence among goals (cooperative versus competitive) and types of actions taken (effective versus bungling). The study uses three concepts to develop their implications for the social processes and personal relations that occur in groups: substitutability (how a person's actions are able to satisfy the intentions of another), cathexis (an individual's disposition to evaluate themselves or their surroundings), and inducibility (the readiness of an individual to accept the influence of another person). The theory was first presented in a paper published in 1949.

While at MIT Deutsch also met his future wife Lydia Shapiro when he was assigned to supervise her work under Lewin. They married on June 1, 1947, a year and a half after they met, and have remained together ever since.

== Early career ==
One of the first projects of Deutsch's academic career was a study of group tension and racial attitudes as a part of the Commission on Community Interrelations of the American Jewish Congress. The goal of the Commission's work was to break through the apathy that the American society of the time had against religious or racial prejudice. In 1951, Deutsch and coauthor Mary Evans Collins, working out of the Research Center for Human Relations at NYU (where Deutsch had started working in 1949), produced a study comparing racially integrated housing in New York with racially segregated housing in Newark, New Jersey. Up until their study, it was the norm for housing projects to follow a policy of segregation. The results of their study led to a reversal of policy in publicly held residential developments and to the belief that segregated housing was undemocratic. The study was published under the title Interracial Housing by the University of Minnesota Press in May of that year. In a 1951 newspaper interview with Louis Danzig, the Director for the segregated housing projects stated that, "The study has served as a catalyst to the re-examination of our basic interracial policies in housing and as a stimulus to their change. Many of us have long felt that artificial separation of colored and white families was an unwholesome procedure. However until the study of Dr. Deutsch and Mrs. Collins, we had no scientific evidence to substantiate our feelings." Modern commentators have accredited Deutsch's research as a valuable contribution to the end of segregation policies in the United States.

In 1951, Deutsch also published the textbook Research Methods in Social Relations with coauthors Marie Jahoda and Stuart W. Cook, a book that would go on to three editions over the following twenty-five years. In 1954, Deutsch began studying at the Postgraduate Center for Psychotherapy, where he graduated as a professionally trained psychoanalytic psychotherapist in 1957. In addition to his work as a social psychologist, he conducted a small practice as a psychotherapist until his retirement in the late 1980s. In 1956, he joined the staff of the Bell Telephone Laboratories, where he did research on interpersonal bargaining and small group processes. While at Bell one of the more prominent experiments he conducted was the Acme-Bolt Trucking game, which concluded that when an individual has the opportunity to apply threat to another in competition they will use it and that this threatening behavior does not lead to cooperation. Deutsch also co-edited the book Preventing World War III in 1962. This work continued from his initial concerns with nuclear warfare, including the idea of nuclear deterrence. As an expert in social psychology, he began appearing on television to discuss the developing field.

== Career at Columbia University ==
In 1963, he made what would be his final move between institutions, when he started at Teachers College, Columbia University after being invited to found a new social psychology doctoral program. The two major works that resulted of his studies during this period are considered to be The Resolution of Conflict (published in 1973) and Distributive Justice (published in 1985). However he also published the book Theories in Social Psychology (1965) and Applying Social Psychology (1975) during this same period. Deutsch was the first psychologist to use the Prisoner's Dilemma to study trust between small groups or pairings of individuals. During this period his work in conflict resolution continued to grow in influence, including his differentiation between constructive conflict and destructive conflict. The impact of his work was seen both in theory and in practice—for example, in 1989, both Janusz Grzelak (a leading figure of the Solidarity movement in Poland) and Janusz Reykowski (a leading figure of the Communist Party of Poland) cited Deutsch's work as part of the infrastructure for the peaceful transfer of power from the Communists to the people.

Deutsch was appointed Edward Lee Thorndike Professor of Psychology and Education in 1981, and delivered his inaugural address on April 22, 1982. Through his work during this phase of his career, he became known as an authority in the fields of conflict resolution, social justice, intergroup relations, and social psychology. In 1986, Deutsch founded the International Center for Cooperation and Conflict Resolution (ICCCR) at Columbia. The goal of the Center was to integrate the theory of conflict resolution with its actual practice. For example, in 1987, the Center was involved in training teachers in Long Island and New Jersey to deal with inter-student and gang violence in lower-income communities.

His work in this period also revolved around the concept of "distributive justice", relating to the distribution of goods and conditions affecting the well-being of individuals in a group, as a separate concept from procedural justice. This research culminated in his 1985 book Distributive Justice. Another major theme of his work was the concept of "Crude Law", which studied the relationships between attitudes, behavior, and relationships. Through his research Deutsch determined that the typical effects of a given relationship tend to induce that relationship. Thus, the typical effects of cooperation induce friendly, helpful behavior and friendly, helpful behavior will induce a cooperative relationship. His Crude Law as well as his research into distributive justice expanded the breadth of his body of work in the field of conflict resolution.

== Late career ==
Deutsch was also a founding member of the World Dignity University initiative and Global Advisory Board Member of the Human Dignity and Humiliation Studies organization. Variously Deutsch was also President of the Society for the Psychological Study of Social Issues, the International Society of Political Psychology, several divisions of the American Psychological Association (APA), as well as the Eastern Psychological Association and New York State Psychological Association.

In 2005, the ICCCR inaugurated the annual Morton Deutsch Award, provided to both a scholar-practitioner in the field of social justice and also to the winner of a student paper competition. The ceremony for the awards is held each year in April. The International Society for Justice Research also inaugurated a Morton Deutsch Award in 2004, for the best article published in Social Justice Research. The Society for the Study of Peace, Conflict, and Violence: Peace Psychology Division of APA also offers an annual Morton Deutsch Conflict Resolution Award funded by the royalties of Deutsch's book Handbook of Conflict Resolution: Theory and Practice, given to a practitioner that contributes to the theory of the field of conflict resolution or vice versa.

Deutsch officially retired from teaching in 1990 but authored more than 50 papers or book chapters between in his retirement,. Over his career he mentored nearly 70 PhD students, most of them at Teachers College. In 2005 author Erica Frydenberg wrote a biography on Deutsch entitled Morton Deutsch: a Life and Legacy of Mediation and Conflict Resolution, and in 2011, Peter Coleman edited the book Conflict, Interdependence, and Justice: The Intellectual Legacy of Morton Deutsch. Articles profiling his life were also written in 2006 by John Jost and in an issue dedicated to his life in the journal Peace and Conflict: Journal of Peace Psychology.

The Columbia University Libraries house the Morton Deutsch Collection, which consists of a print and online archive of his work. In his retirement, Deutsch served at Columbia as E.L. Thorndike Professor Emeritus of Psychology and Education.

== Awards ==
In 1969, Deutsch was awarded the Kurt Lewin Memorial Award, named for his PhD mentor at MIT. He was awarded the 1993 and inaugural Lifetime Achievement Award given out every two years by the International Association for Conflict Management. His citation for the award stated that Deutsch had also won "the G. W. Allport Prize, the Carl Hovland Memorial Award, and the AAAS Socio-psychological Prize, to mention a few. Dr. Deutsch has received several lifetime achievement awards for his work on conflict management, cooperative learning, peace psychology, and the applications of psychology to social issues". Deutsch was the recipient of the Teachers College Medal for Distinguished Service to Education, Helsinki University Medal for his contributions to psychology, and an honorary doctorate from his alma mater CCNY. Deutsch received distinguished scientific contribution awards from three professional societies: the Society of Experimental Social Psychology in 1985; the American Psychological Association in 1987; and the William James Fellow Award of the Association for Psychological Science. He was the winner of the 1961 AAAS Prize for Behavioral Science Research. Deutsch was also awarded the 2006 James McKeen Cattell Fellow Award from the Association for Psychological Science.

In addition to receiving these awards, he has been honored by the establishment of the Morton Deutsch Conflict Resolution Award by the International Center for Cooperation and Conflict Resolution.

== Books ==
- Deutsch, M. (1973) The Resolution of Conflict: Constructive and Destructive Processes. New Haven, CT: Yale University Press.
- Deutsch, M. (1985). Distributive Justice: A Social Psychological Perspective. New Haven, CT: Yale University Press.
- Deutsch, M. & Coleman, P. T. (2012). Psychological Components of Sustainable Peace. New York, NY: Springer.
- Deutsch, M. & Coleman, P. T. (2000). The Handbook of Conflict Resolution: Theory and Practice. San Francisco, CA: Jossey-Bass.
- Deutsch, M., Coleman, P. T., & Marcus, E. C. (2006). The Handbook of Conflict Resolution: Theory and Practice (2nd ed.). San Francisco, CA: Jossey-Bass.
- Deutsch, M. & Collins, M. E. (1951). Interracial Housing: A Psychological Evaluation of a Social Experiment. Minneapolis, MN: University of Minnesota Press.
- Deutsch, M. & Hornstein, H. (Eds.). (1975). Applying Social Psychology: Implications for Research, Practice and Training. Hillsdale, NJ: L. Erlbaum Associates.
- Deutsch, M. & Krauss, R. M. (1965). Theories in Social Psychology. New York, NY: Basic Books.
- Jahoda, M., Deutsch, M., & Cook, S. W. (1951). Research Methods in Social Relations. New York, NY: Holt & Dryden.
- Wright, Q., Evan, W. M., & Deutsch, M. (1962). Preventing World War III: Some Proposals. New York, NY: Simon and Schuster.
