= Relational grammar =

Syntactic theory

In linguistics, relational grammar (RG) is a syntactic theory which argues that primitive grammatical relations provide the ideal means to state syntactic rules in universal terms. Relational grammar began as an alternative to transformational grammar.

== Grammatical Relations Hierarchy ==
Relational Grammar starts from the assumption that grammatical relations like subject, direct object, and indirect object are primitive features of grammar. These three central relations are referred to as terms. There are also non-terms, such as obliques, objects of comparatives, benefactives, and others. These relations are posited to be in a hierarchy, called the Grammatical Relations Hierarchy (or GR Hierarchy). The three term relations are numbered: subject → 1, direct object → 2, and indirect object → 3. Non-term relations do not receive a number.

Grammatical relations hierarchy
1	→	Subject
2	→	Direct object
3	→	Indirect object
		Obliques (locatives, benefactives, instruments)

It is worth noting that although it is taken as a given in most work in Relational Grammar, little independent justification is given in the literature for the GR hierarchy itself. However, it has been observed that it resembles patterns seen elsewhere; for instance, the GR Hierarchy reflects the default word-order in many languages, is reflected in agreement paradigms cross linguistically, and correlates with the accessibility hierarchy seen in relative clauses.

The valency of a predicate (that is, the number of dependents or arguments the predicate has) is listed in the lexicon along with the predicate. In any given clause, each dependent is assigned one (and only one) relation. The predicate is marked P. Term relations are usually referred to simply by their number in the hierarchy rather than full names like "subject" and "direct object".

1	P	3	2
John	gave	Mary	a kiss

== Strata ==
A central component of relational grammar analysis is the concept of a stratum. A stratum represents the grammatical relationships between a predicate and its various dependents (or arguments). A single analysis may utilize multiple strata, and the properties of any given dependent may be distributed across multiple strata. Given that Relational Grammar rejects the idea of a derivation in the Generative sense, each stratum in an analysis should be thought of as a separate level of representation of the sentence under analysis and not as a distinct derivational step.

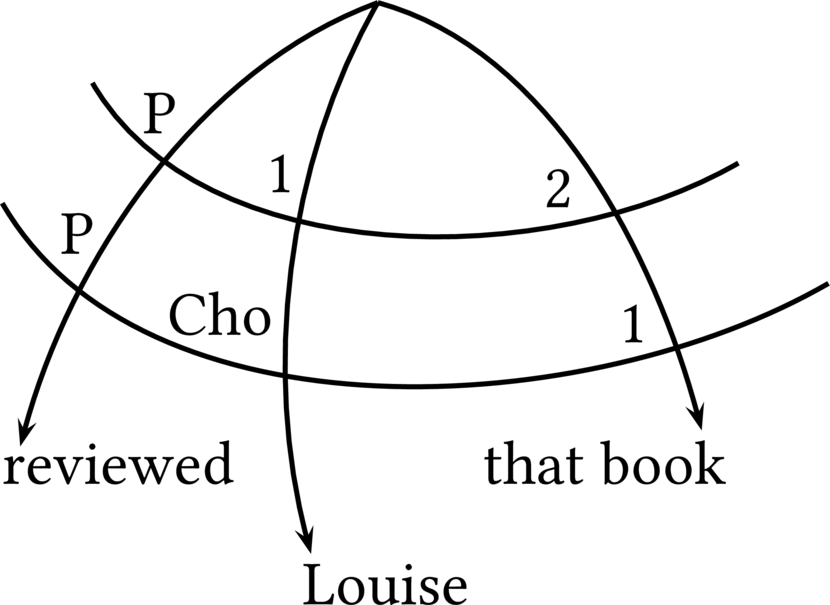
A Relational Grammar stratal diagram showing an analysis of the passive clause That book was reviewed by Louise.

Analyses are commonly represented by stratal diagrams like the one to the right. These diagrams abstract away from word order and the intricate details of syntactic structure and focus instead on the relation between predicates and their dependents. In the stratal diagram to the right, the roughly vertical arcs represent the predicate (labeled "P") and its dependents, each labeled with a number from the Grammatical Relations Hierarchy discussed above. Each of the horizontal arcs represents a different stratum.

Dependents can be associated with a different term on the GR Hierarchy on each stratum, a theoretical device called revaluation. This, it is argued, allows Relational Grammar to capture broad, cross-linguistic generalizations about the relations between dependents in apparently related constructions. For example, in the diagram to the right the dependent that is a 2 at the initial (i.e., top) stratum is promoted to a 1 in the second stratum. The promotion from 2 to 1 is argued to characterize the relationship between active voice clauses and their passive voice counterparts cross-linguistically, without needing to refer to language-specific details like word order and verbal morphology.

There are several constraints and hypotheses that underpin this sort of analysis. For instance, the Stratal Uniqueness Law dictates that any given dependent can bear only one term relation on each stratum. Thus, when a 2 is promoted to a 1, the original 1 cannot remain a 1. The Oblique Law furthermore stipulates that a term relation cannot be demoted to an oblique since all obliques must be determined in the initial stratum.

When this situation occurs, the initial 1 is instead demoted to a chômeur (from the French for an unemployed person); such dependents are also said to be en chômage. The chômeur relation is a proposal unique to Relational Grammar. In the diagram to the right, this is represented by the abbreviation "Cho". It is hypothesized that arguments en chômage display different grammatical behavior. For instance, the chômeur in the diagram to the right can no longer dictate verbal agreement and appears in a prepositional phrase rather than subject position.

== Universals ==
One of the components of RG theory is a set of linguistic universals stated in terms of the numbered roles presented above. Such a universal is the stratal uniqueness law, which states that there can be at most one 1, 2, and 3 per stratum.

Pullum (1977) lists three more universals:

1. The NP constituents of a clause are linearized in their GR hierarchy order, from left to right.
2. The verb of a clause may be placed in
  (a) initial position in all clauses,
  (b) second position in all clauses, or
  (c) final position in all clauses.
3. If placement of the verb leaves the subject NP noninitial, the subject may be assigned final position.

However, Pullum formulated these universals before the discovery of languages with object-initial word order. After the discovery of such languages, he retracted his prior statements.

== Legacy and influence ==
Relational Grammar had its heyday in the mid-1970s and 1980s and influenced other theoretical approaches to syntax, including Lexical Functional Grammar and Generalized Phrase Structure Grammar. By the late 1980s, approximately 150 linguists had published work in Relational Grammar, but only around half a dozen were still actively contributing to the framework.

== See also ==
- Arc pair grammar
- Role and reference grammar
