= El Castillo, Nicaragua =

Municipality in Río San Juan Department, Nicaragua

El Castillo
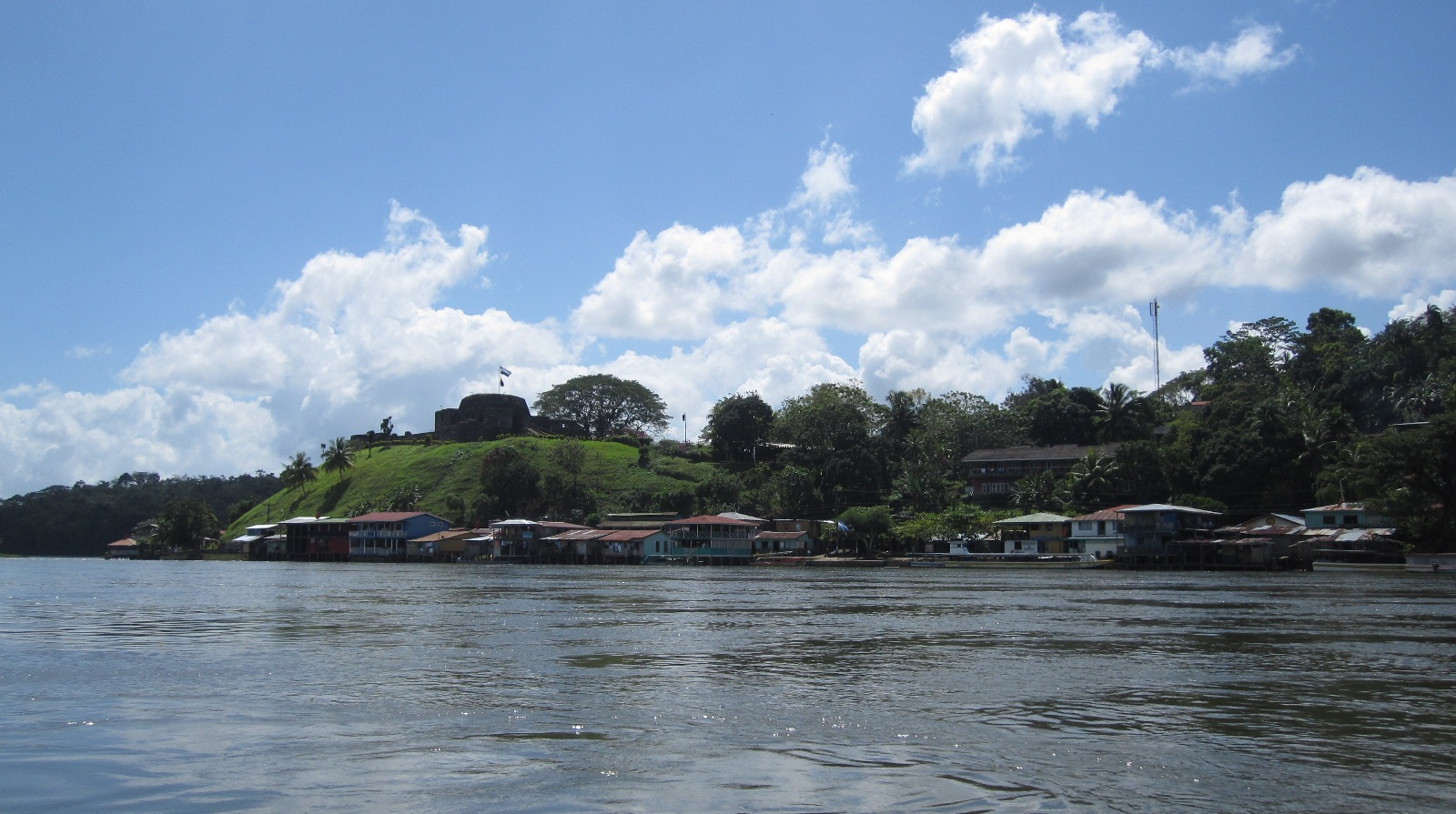

- Location of the municipality of El Castillo within the Río San Juan Department, Nicaragua
- Coordinates: 11°02′N 84°28′W
- Country: Nicaragua
- Department: Río San Juan
- Municipality: El Castillo

Area
  - Total: 1,656 km^{2} (639 sq mi)
- Elevation: 33 m (108 ft)

Population (2005)
  - Total: 19,864

El Castillo is a municipality located on the Río San Juan (San Juan River) in the Río San Juan Department of Nicaragua. The settlement of what would eventually become the municipality of El Castillo began in 1673, when construction of the Fortaleza de la Limpia Pura e Inmaculada Concepción, (now known as the Castillo de la Inmaculada Concepción, or Fortress of the Immaculate Conception) was begun. The village of El Castillo eventually grew around the fortress, which continued to be strategically important to the Captaincy General of Guatemala until the late 18th century.

The administrative capital of the municipality of El Castillo is the village of Boca de Sábalos, which translates from Spanish to "mouth of the tarpon" (Megalops atlanticus). Boca de Sábalos is located 350 kilometers from the national capital of Managua, 55 kilometers downriver from the departmental capital of San Carlos and several kilometers upriver from the village of El Castillo.

== History ==
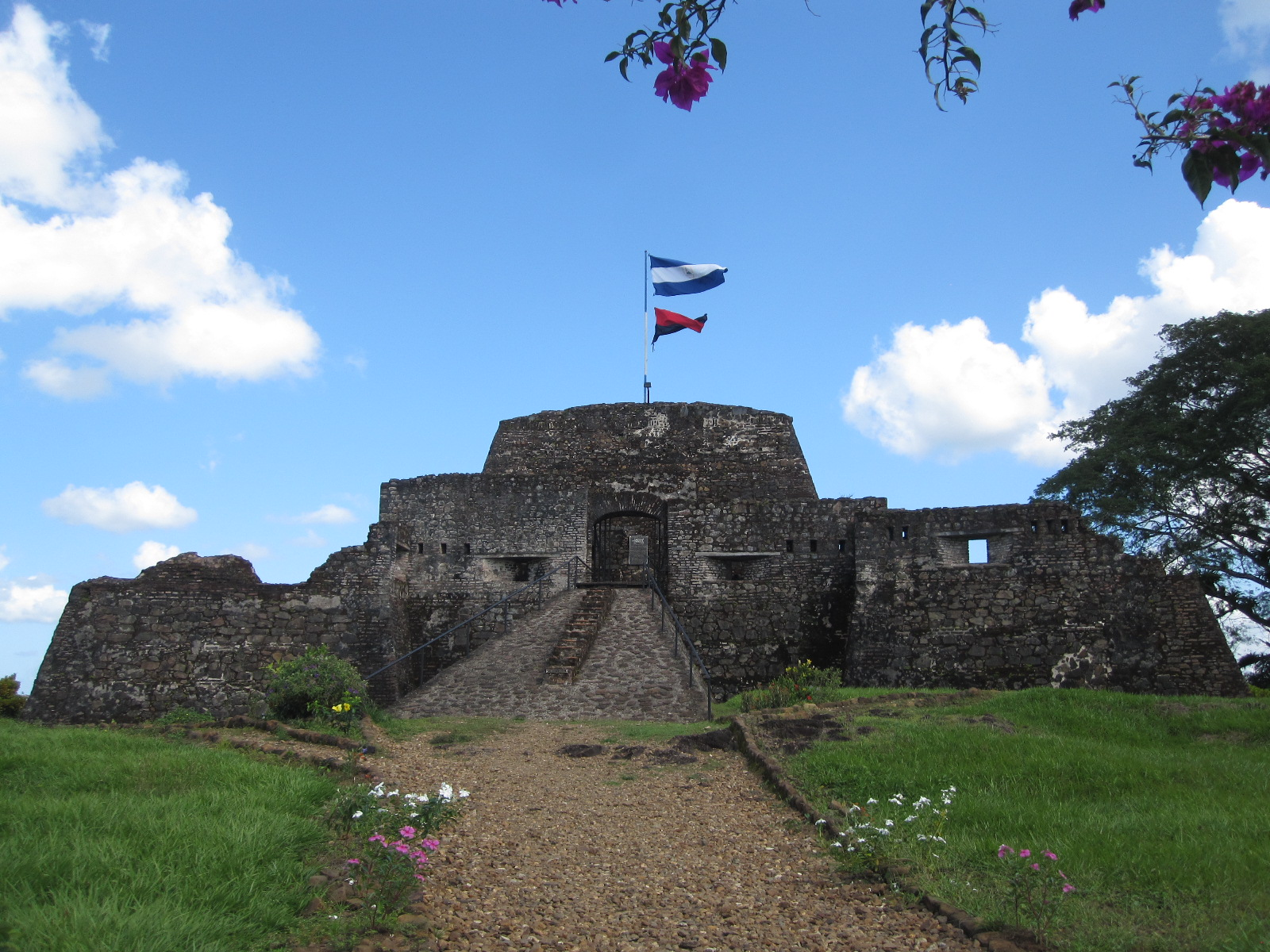
Fortress of the Immaculate Conception

The municipality of El Castillo began with the construction of the Fortress of the Immaculate Conception on the southern bank of the San Juan River, approximately 6 kilometers from the present-day border with Costa Rica. This was part of a series of fortifications built along the San Juan River in order to defend against pirate attacks upon the city of Granada (which can be reached by navigating upstream from the Caribbean Sea along the San Juan River into Lake Nicaragua). Construction of the fortress, initially named Fortaleza de la Limpia Pura e Inmaculada Concepción (now known as the Castillo de la Inmaculada Concepción, or Fortress of the Immaculate Conception), was begun on March 10, 1673, and completed in 1675. The chosen site was the site of the present-day village of El Castillo. Despite the construction of the fortress, buccaneer William Dampier plundered the city and set it on fire on April 8, 1685.

The fortress was attacked several times during the 18th century, sometimes by miskito or zambo forces and sometimes by the British. On the morning of July 26, 1762, a combined British and Miskito force laid siege to the fortress in what would later be called the Battle for the Río San Juan de Nicaragua. This expedition, which had originally sailed from a base in Jamaica, consisted of seven large boats and several canoes. The garrison commander, Don José de Herrera y Sotomayor, had died unexpectedly 11 days earlier. Inspired by acts of heroism displayed by Herrera's 19-year-old daughter Rafaela (including killing the British commander), pro tempore garrison commander Lieutenant Juan de Aguilar y Santa Cruz led the defenders to victory in a battle that lasted six days. The British finally lifted their siege and retreated on August 3, 1762. In 1781, King Charles III of Spain issued a royal decree granting Rafaela Herrera a pension for life, as a reward for her heroic defense during that battle.

After Spain entered the American Revolutionary War in 1779, Major General John Dalling, the British governor and commander-in-chief of Jamaica, proposed a second naval expedition to Nicaragua. The goal was to sail up the San Juan River to Lake Nicaragua and capture the town of Granada, which would effectively cut Spanish America in half as well as provide potential access to the Pacific Ocean. During this expedition, which took place in 1780 and later became known as the San Juan Expedition, Colonel John Polson and Captain Horatio Nelson led a British attack against the fortress. At the time, the Spanish garrison consisted of 228 men under the command of Juan de Ayssa (who later served as Governor of Nicaragua from 1783 to 1787). The expeditionary force succeeded in capturing the fortress on April 29, 1780, despite the fact that it consisted of only 200 men. The 22-year-old Nelson, in command of HMS Hinchinbrook, was responsible for leading his men through dense jungle to attack the fortress from a hill in the rear. The British captured the fortress and occupied it for nine months, finally abandoning it in January 1781. The hill is named Lomas de Nelson to this day.

== Geography ==
The municipality of El Castillo is remote from major population centers, with dense vegetation and adverse weather conditions. The topographic features include hilly soil, with good conditions for agriculture and livestock. The village is situated in a tropical rainforest climate, with wet weather conditions. The average temperature is about 25 °C, and annual rainfall ranges from 2,800 to 4,000 mm. To the north of El Castillo municipality is the municipality of Bluefields. To the south is the Republic of Costa Rica, to the east is the municipality of San Juan de Nicaragua and to the west is the municipality of San Carlos. The county seat is located 350 km from the city of Managua. The total area is 1,656 km2 (639.4 sq mi).

== Economy ==
Historically the municipality has been engaged in forestry, logging of tropical hardwoods, extraction of other forest products such as medicinal herbs and other non-timber forest products. From 1948 to 1951 and then from 1968 to 1970, the municipality of El Castillo was a major producer of bananas. The bananas were transported to Puerto Limón in Costa Rica, where they were sold by U.S. companies. Cultivation later declined as a result of black sigatoka (a disease caused by Mycosphaerella fijiensis, a fungus of the Ascomycota phylum).

The main economic activity continues to be agriculture, most notably corn and bananas. There are also a number of small businesses that serve the needs of the local and tourist population. These include 25 small markets, 9 bakeries, 2 butcher shops, 7 restaurants, 20 bars (6 just for tourists), 4 hotels, 4 sport shops, 5 carpenters shops, 2 gas stations for boats, and 1 mill.

== Political subdivisions ==
There are 27 comarcas in the municipality of El Castillo: El Castillo, Boca de Sábalos (where the municipality administration is located), Santa Cruz, Sábalo, San Antonio, Mauricio Gutiérrez, Laureano Mairena, Marlon Zelaya, Marcelo, Buena Vista, Gordiano, Guasimo, La Quesada, Las Colinas, Che Guevara, Boca de Escalara, Las Maravillas, Chanchon, Libertad Sandino, El Bosque, Laguna Blanca, La Ñoca, Sompopera, El Roble, Monico, Bartola, Rivera del Río San Juan and Río Cariño.

== Education ==
Of roughly 5,000 citizens of school age in the municipality, only roughly 1,800 attend school. This is largely due to the great distances between home and school facilities, lack of roads and suitable vehicles, and the difficult economic situations of many families of the community. At the preschool level, there are 179 students enrolled, 4 schools, and 9 teachers. At the primary school level, there are 1015 students enrolled, 10 schools, and 32 teachers. At the secondary school level, there are 178 students enrolled, 1 school, and 5 teachers.

== See also ==
- Municipalities of Nicaragua
