= El Castillo (village) =

- Comarca and village
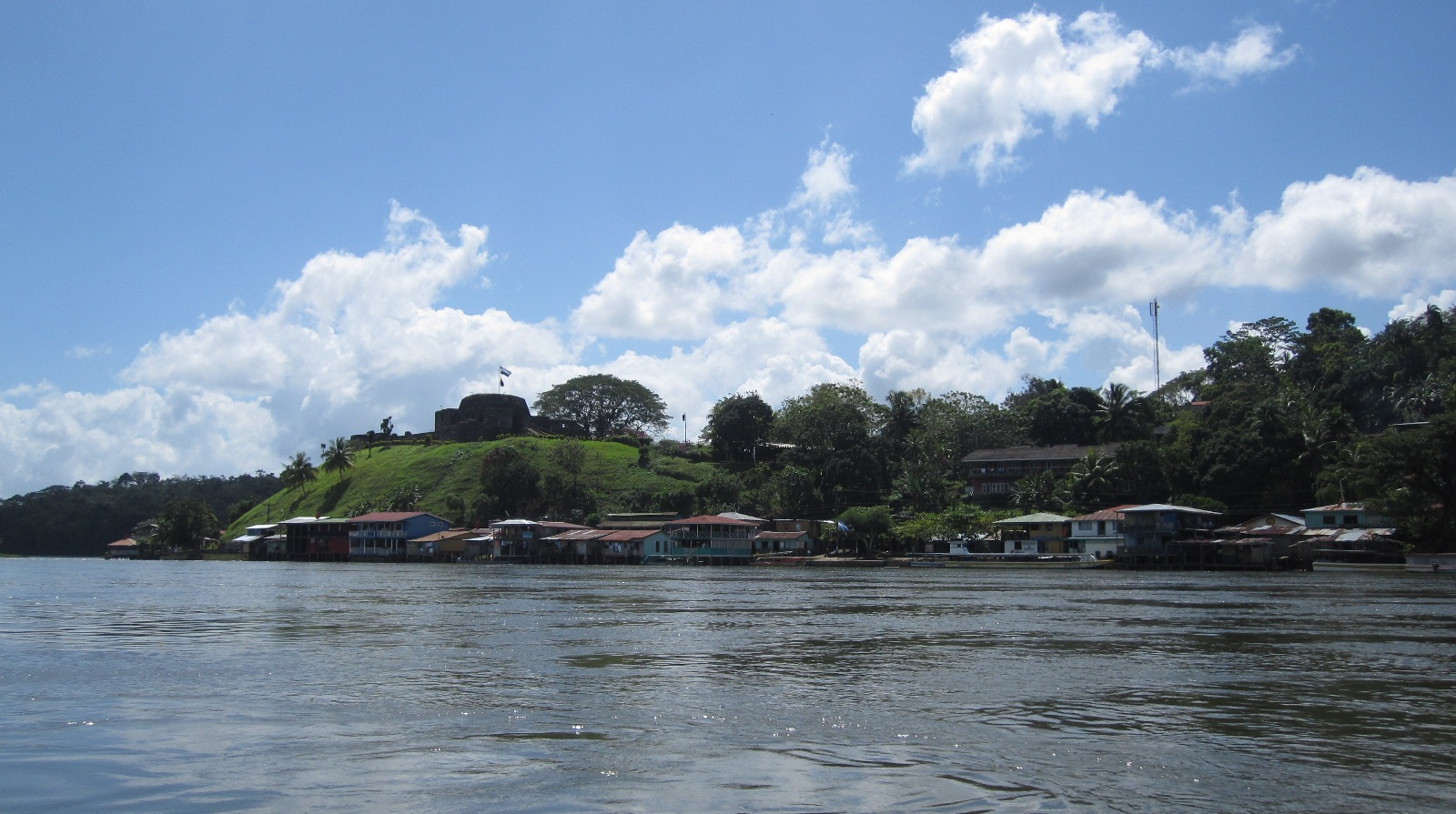

- Location within Nicaragua
- Coordinates: 11°01′04″N 84°24′04″W
- Country: Nicaragua
- Department: Río San Juan Department
- Municipality: El Castillo
- Elevation: 33 m (108 ft)

El Castillo is a village of about 1,500 people situated on the southern bank of the Río San Juan (San Juan River) in southern Nicaragua. It is one of 27 comarcas of the municipality of El Castillo, a subdivision of the Río San Juan Department. The village is situated approximately 6 kilometers from the border with Costa Rica, at the Raudal del Diablo rapids of the San Juan River. The site on which the village of El Castillo is built was initially established in 1673 as a Spanish fortification to defend against pirate attacks upon the city of Granada (which can be reached by navigating upstream from the Caribbean Sea along the San Juan River into Lake Nicaragua). The settlement of El Castillo and its fortress continued to be strategically important to the Captaincy General of Guatemala until the late 18th century.

== History ==
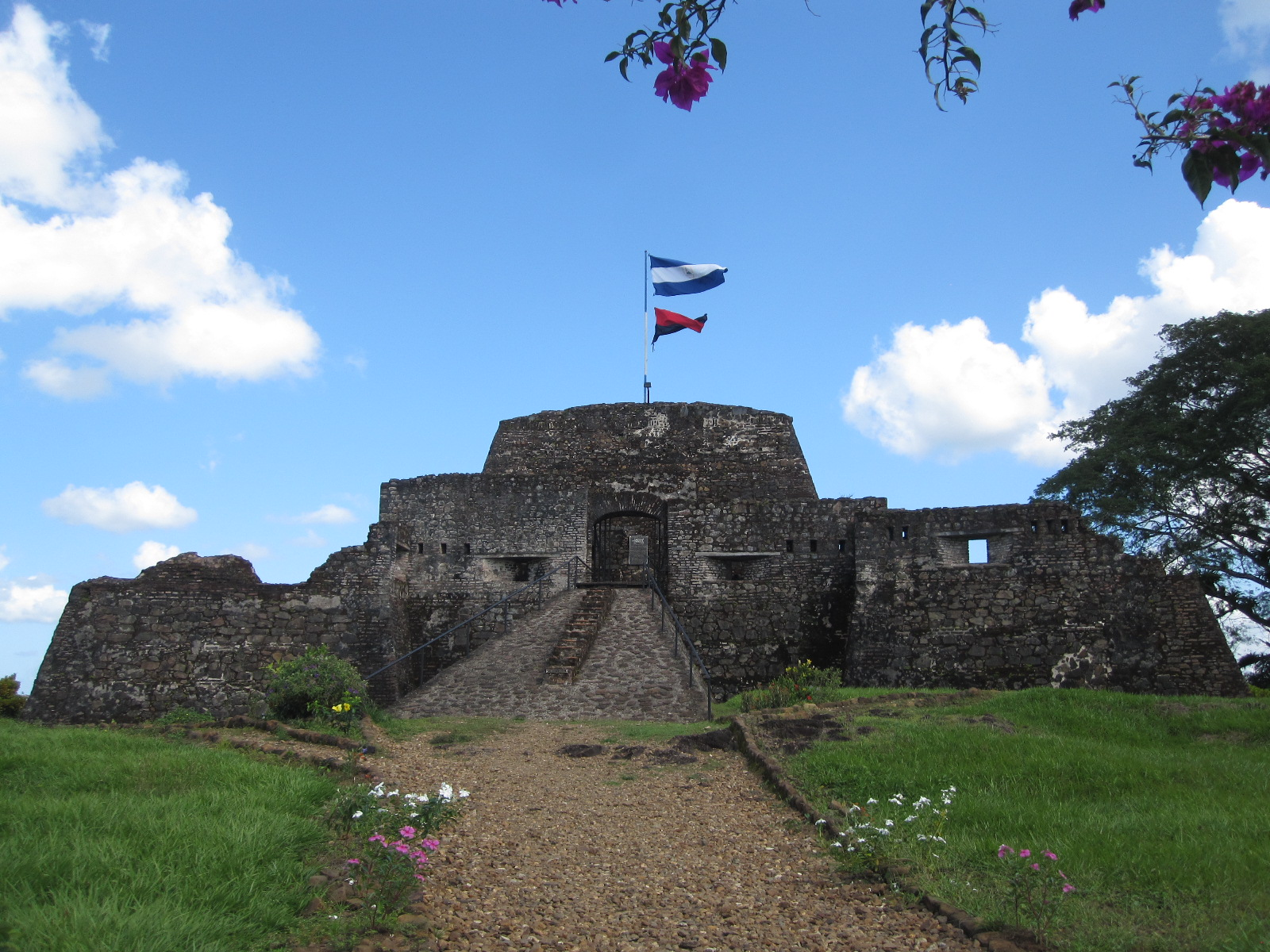
Fortress of the Immaculate Conception

By the late 17th century, the success of the city of Granada had made it a victim of pirate attacks. The most notable of these was in 1670 by the pirate Gallardino, who approached the city from Lake Nicaragua after navigating up the treacherous San Juan River from the Caribbean Sea. Gallardino's successful 1670 raid on Granada emphasized the need for a more effective defense of Nicaragua, and it was obvious to the Spanish colonial authorities that they would have to construct a series of fortifications along the San Juan River in order to protect the citizens of Granada from future attacks.

After an exploratory expedition which took place from January to February 1673, Captain General Fernando Francisco de Escobedo and military engineer Martín de Andújar Cantos decided to build a fortress at the Raudal del Diablo (known at that time as the Raudal de Santa Cruz), atop the ruins of the previous Fuerte de Santa Cruz, which dated from the time of King Philip III of Spain. The chosen site was the site of the present-day village of El Castillo.

Construction of the fortress, initially named Fortaleza de la Limpia Pura e Inmaculada Concepción (now known as the Castillo de la Inmaculada Concepción, or Fortress of the Immaculate Conception), was begun on March 10, 1673, and completed in 1675. Despite the construction of the fortress, buccaneer William Dampier plundered the city and set it on fire on April 8, 1685.

The fortress was attacked several times during the 18th century, sometimes by miskito or zambo forces and sometimes by the British. On the morning of July 26, 1762, a combined British and Miskito force laid siege to the fortress in what would later be called the Battle for the Río San Juan de Nicaragua. This expedition, which had originally sailed from a base in Jamaica, consisted of seven large boats and several canoes. The garrison commander, Don José de Herrera y Sotomayor, had died unexpectedly 11 days earlier. Inspired by acts of heroism displayed by Herrera's 19-year-old daughter Rafaela (including killing the British commander), pro tempore garrison commander Lieutenant Juan de Aguilar y Santa Cruz led the defenders to victory in a battle that lasted six days. The British finally lifted their siege and retreated on August 3, 1762. In 1781, King Charles III of Spain issued a royal decree granting Rafaela Herrera a pension for life, as a reward for her heroic defense during that battle.

After Spain entered the American Revolutionary War in 1779, Major General John Dalling, the British governor and commander-in-chief of Jamaica, proposed a second naval expedition to Nicaragua. The goal was to sail up the San Juan River to Lake Nicaragua and capture the town of Granada, which would effectively cut Spanish America in half as well as provide potential access to the Pacific Ocean. During this expedition, which took place in 1780 and later became known as the San Juan Expedition, Colonel John Polson and Captain Horatio Nelson led a British attack against the fortress. At the time, the Spanish garrison consisted of 228 men under the command of Juan de Ayssa (who later served as Governor of Nicaragua from 1783 – 1787). The expeditionary force succeeded in capturing the fortress on April 29, 1780, despite the fact that it consisted of only 200 men. The 22-year-old Nelson, in command of HMS Hinchinbrook, was responsible for leading his men through dense jungle to attack the fortress from a hill in the rear. The British captured the fortress and occupied it for nine months, finally abandoning it in January 1781. The hill is named Lomas de Nelson to this day.

== Geography and climate ==
The topographic features include hilly soil, with good conditions for agriculture and livestock. The village is situated in a tropical rainforest climate, with wet weather conditions. The average temperature is about 25 °C, and annual rainfall ranges from 2,800 to 4,000 mm.

== Economy ==
From 1948 to 1951 and then from 1968 to 1970, the municipality of El Castillo was a major producer of bananas. The bananas were transported to Puerto Limón in Costa Rica, where they were sold by U.S. companies. Cultivation later declined as a result of black sigatoka (a disease caused by Mycosphaerella fijiensis, a fungus of the Ascomycota phylum). The main economic activity today continues to be agriculture, most notably corn and bananas.

== Museums and other points of interest ==
The Fortress of the Immaculate Conception is a historic landmark of Nicaragua, which currently houses a museum and library. It is on a list of sites pending approval as a World Heritage Site by the United Nations Educational, Scientific and Cultural Organization (UNESCO).

The village of El Castillo is also the most convenient base from which to explore the Indio Maíz Biological Reserve, owing to its proximity. Located only 6 kilometers east of El Castillo by boat, the Bartola River is a tributary to the San Juan River which forms the western border of the Indio Maíz Biological Reserve. This makes a daytrip a practical option for visiting the reserve; one can hire a guide and arrange river transportation in El Castillo.

== Infrastructure ==
There are no roads in El Castillo; the only regularly scheduled transportation to the village is by boat. Walking or bicycle are the only significant means of transportation within the village. Riverboats plying the San Juan River are the main means of transportation to any other community. The nearest commercial airport is located in San Carlos, the capital city of the Río San Juan Department. Utilities serving the city include electricity, drinking water, sewage treatment, and cellular network. The only significant health care facility is the Venta Social de Medicamentos Inmaculada Concepción, a pharmacy located in the center of the village, south of the docks and nearly halfway up Loma Nelson.

== Pictures ==
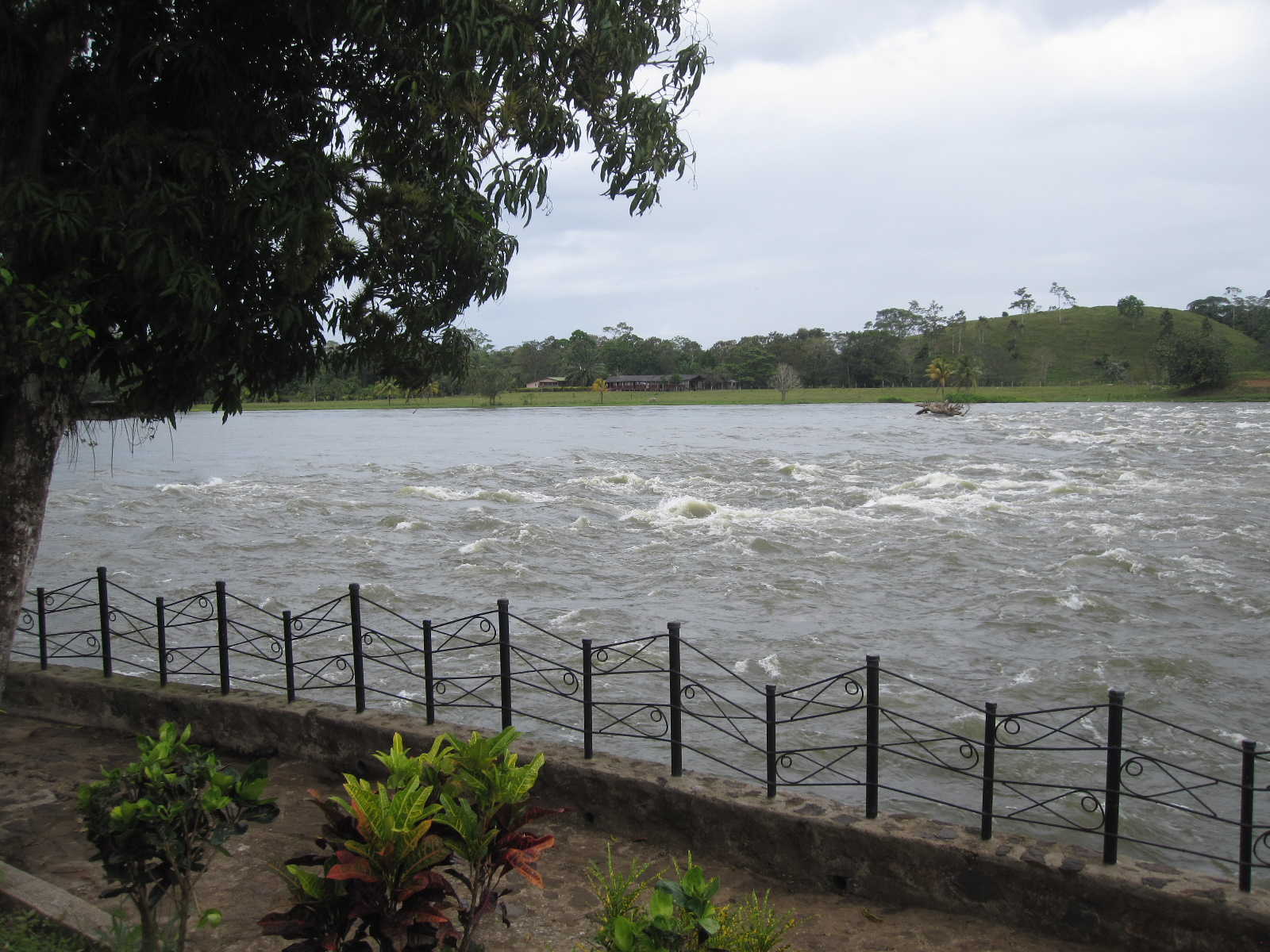
View of the Raudal del Diablo rapids of the San Juan River from the village of El Castillo in southern Nicaragua

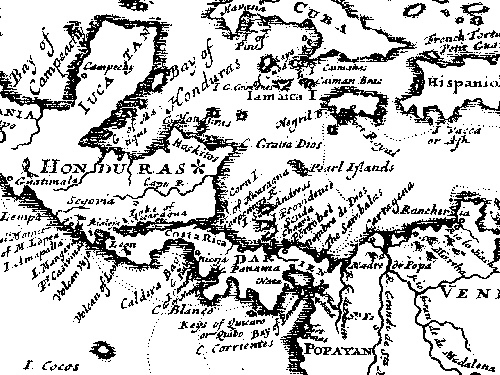
Map from "A New Voyage Round the World", published in 1697 by William Dampier, the English buccaneer. The Mosquito Coast is marked with a star.

== See also ==
- History of Modern Banana Plantations in the Americas
- Piracy in the Caribbean
