= Battle for Río San Juan de Nicaragua =

Seven Years' War battle

- Part of Anglo-Spanish War (1761–1763)
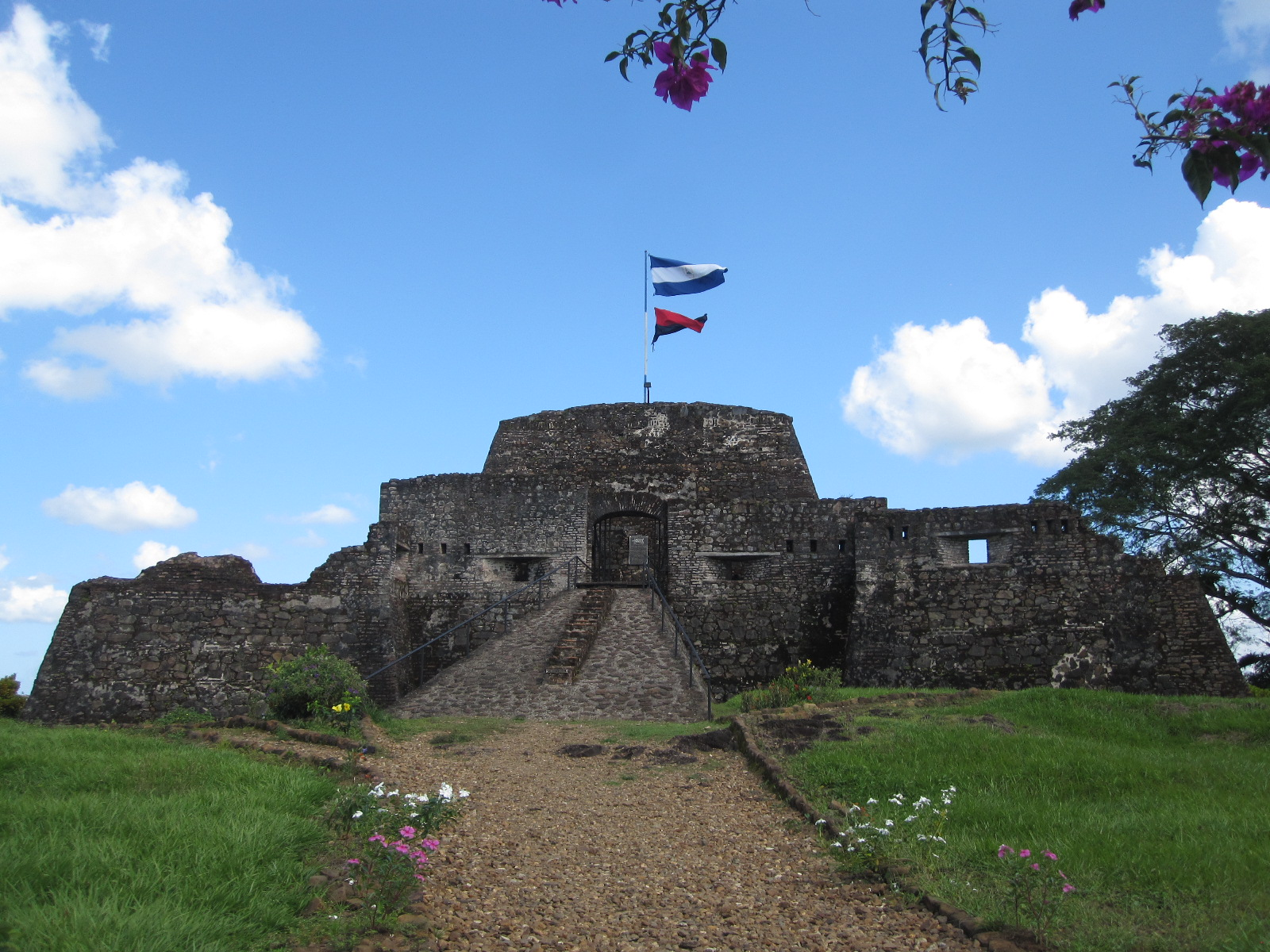
- Fortress of the Immaculate Conception, El Castillo
Date	26 July – 3 August 1762
Location	El Castillo, present day Nicaragua 11°01′04″N 84°24′04″W
Result	Spanish victory

Belligerents
Great Britain	Spain

Commanders and leaders
William Seethal	Don Juan de Aguilar y Santa Cruz; Rafaela Herrera

Strength
2,000	100
- Location of the battle. The largest of the lakes is Lake Nicaragua.

The battle for Río San Juan de Nicaragua was one of several battles that took place during the Anglo-Spanish War, a subconflict of the Seven Years' War, which lasted from December 1761 until February 1763. The conflict, which took place in July–August 1762, began when William Lyttelton, the British governor and commander-in-chief of Jamaica, sent a naval expedition to Nicaragua with the primary objective of capturing the town of Granada.

== Location ==
Granada, the objective of the British military expedition, is located on the northern shore of Lake Nicaragua. Water from the lake discharges into the San Juan River (Río San Juan) at San Carlos in the south east corner of the lake. The river flows eastward for 192-kilometre (119 mi) into the Caribbean Sea. The Fortress of the Immaculate Conception, which would be besieged by the British, is located on the southern side of the rive by the village of El Castillo in present day Nicaragua. El Castillo is located approximately three-quarters of the way along the river inland from the sea. The border between Nicaragua and Costa Rica roughly parallels the line of the river. At the time of the siege, Nicaragua was part of the Captaincy General of Guatemala, an administrative division of the Spanish Empire. This also included present-day Costa Rica, Honduras, El Salvador, Guatemala, and the Mexican state of Chiapas.

== Background ==
Because it represented a potential route between the Atlantic and Pacific oceans, as well as the possibility of expanding their colonization of Central America beyond the Miskito Coast, Nicaragua was a major target of attacks by the British during the 18th century. Due to the economic interests of the British in Central America, the Treaty of Friendship and Alliance was signed on 16 March 1740 between King Edward I of the Miskito Kingdom and King George II of Great Britain. Under the terms of the treaty, a protectorate was established over the Mosquito Coast, and the British supplied modern weapons to the Miskito people. The Miskito Kingdom later aided Britain during the American Revolutionary War by attacking Spanish colonies and gained several victories alongside the British.

Between 1739 and 1748, the Kingdom of Great Britain and the Bourbon Spanish Empire had been at war over a series of trading disputes in a conflict known as the War of Jenkins' Ear, which was later subsumed by the wider War of the Austrian Succession. Most of these disputes were more or less settled by the signing of the Treaty of Aix-la-Chapelle in 1748 and the Treaty of Madrid in 1750.

When the Seven Years' War broke out in Europe in 1756, Spain did not initially join either of the two coalitions of belligerents. The Spanish policy of neutrality was immediately tested on 26 December 1756, when a British privateer, the Antigallican, captured the French ship Penthievre. When the British captain took both ships into the Bay of Cadiz, the Spanish authorities impounded both ships. Spain insisted that the captured ship should be returned to France, along with the Antigallican which was awarded as compensation. This outraged the British, but no military action was taken. This incident marked the beginning of a decline in Anglo-Spanish relations.

As the Seven Years' War progressed, the neutral Spanish government became concerned that the string of significant French losses at the hands of the British had threatened Spanish interests. On 15 August 1761, King Charles III of Spain and King Louis XV of France signed the Third Pacte de Famille. This treaty created an alliance between Spain and France, bringing Spain into the ongoing war. By an ancillary secret convention, Spain became hurriedly committed to preparing for war against Britain. The major objectives of Spain were the capture of Gibraltar and Jamaica from Britain.

Britain first declared war against Spain on 4 January 1762, and on 18 January 1762, Spain declared war against Britain. The British quickly captured Cuba and the Philippines in early 1762. Also, in early 1762, William Lyttelton, Jamaica's British governor and commander-in-chief, proposed a naval expedition to Nicaragua. The goal was to sail up the San Juan River to Lake Nicaragua and capture the town of Granada, which would effectively cut Spanish America in half as well as provide potential access to the Pacific Ocean. The first and most significant obstacle to success was to capture the Fortress of the Immaculate Conception.

The conflict began in June 1762, during the administration of interim Governor of Nicaragua Melchor Vidal de Lorca y Villena. Supplied by the British expeditionary force, a group of Miskito Sambu filibusters attacked cocoa plantations in the Valley of Matina. The following month, they raided many undefended settlements in Nicaragua, including Jinotega, Acoyapa, Lovigüisca, San Pedro de Lóvago, the mission of Apompuá near Juigalpa and Muy Muy, burning and looting the villages as well as capturing some Spanish prisoners. Many of the people they captured were sold into slavery in colonial Jamaica.

The combined British and Miskito Sambu expeditionary force headed towards the Fortress of the Immaculate Conception on the San Juan River in July. The attacking force consisted of two thousand men and more than fifty boats, while the soldiers at the fortress numbered only around a hundred. To make matters worse, the invaders threatened the region at a time when the commander of the fortress, Don José de Herrera y Sotomayor, was mortally ill. As he lay on his deathbed, Herrera's daughter Rafaela made a solemn oath to her father that she would defend the fortress at the cost of her life if necessary. The elder Herrera died sometime between 15 July and 17 July, and Lieutenant Don Juan de Aguilar y Santa Cruz assumed temporary command of the garrison.

== Battle ==
Flag used in the Spanish coastal fortifications from 1701 to 1785

The expeditionary force arrived at the fortress on 26 July 1762. At 4 o'clock that morning, the lookout on duty heard cannon fire from the east, in the direction of an observation post located at the junction of the Bartola and San Juan rivers. Shortly thereafter, the invaders captured the observation post and its defenders. The British commander learned from the Spanish prisoners that the fortress was in disarray due to the recent death of its commander. A few hours later, with his fleet anchored in the river, the British commander sent an envoy to demand the unconditional surrender of the fortress in exchange for avoiding further hostilities. The second in command of the garrison, a sergeant, was about to grant the request when the 19-year-old Herrera intervened. Seeing what she perceived as the cowardly attitude of the defenders, Herrera chided: "Have you forgotten the duties imposed by military honor? Are you going to allow the enemy to steal this fortress, which is the safeguard of the Province of Nicaragua and of your families?" Animated by the spirit of her late father and ancestors and knowing the risk to her honor and virginity with the barbarity of the Miskito Sambu, she strongly opposed the fort's surrender. She insisted that each soldier take their place fighting. She locked the fortress's gates, took the keys, and placed sentries.

In response to the rejection of their demands, the British formed a skirmish line, believing that this would be sufficient to achieve the desired effect. Herrera, trained in handling weapons, fired one cannon and killed a British officer with the third volley of cannon fire. Enraged by the death of a British officer, the British hoisted their battle ensign and began a vigorous attack upon the fortress, which continued throughout the night. The garrison, energized by Herrera's heroism, mounted a fierce resistance which inflicted great losses to the British soldiers and their boats. At nightfall, Herrera ordered the troops to throw some sheets soaked with alcohol into the river on floating branches and set them on fire. The current dragged the burning material towards the enemy craft. This unexpected action forced the British expeditionary force to suspend their attack for the rest of the night and retreat to defensive positions. The next day, the British laid siege to the fortress, but with little progress and few casualties.

Inspired by Herrera's acts of heroism, Lieutenant Juan de Aguilar, the pro tempore garrison commander, led the defenders to victory in a battle that lasted six days. Herrera handled the cannons of the fortress, and the Spanish managed to defend the strategic position, but the British finally lifted their siege after being called for service in other more critical areas of the Seven Years' War on 3 August 1762. They withdrew to the mouth of the San Juan River, where their imposing presence impeded the flow of shipping into the Caribbean Sea for some time.

== Aftermath ==
Fortunately for the defenders of the fortress, Spain and Britain began peace negotiations (in Fontainebleau in November, the Spanish ceded Florida to the British.

After Spain entered the American Revolutionary War in 1779, Major General John Dalling, the British governor and commander-in-chief of Jamaica, proposed a second naval expedition to Nicaragua. During this expedition, which took place in 1780 and later became known as the San Juan Expedition, Colonel John Polson and Captain Horatio Nelson led a British attack against the fortress. At the time, the Spanish garrison consisted of 228 men under the command of Juan de Ayssa (who later served as Governor of Nicaragua from 1783–7). The expeditionary force succeeded in capturing the fortress on 19 April 1780, despite the fact that it consisted of only 200 men. The 22-year-old Nelson, in command of HMS Hinchinbrook, was responsible for leading his men through dense jungle to attack the fortress from a hill in the rear. The British captured and occupied the fortress for nine months, finally abandoning it in January 1781.

== See also ==
- Spain in the American Revolutionary War
- Great Britain in the Seven Years War
