= Anglo-Spanish War (1762–1763) =

Military conflict, part of the Seven Years' War

- Part of the Seven Years' War and the Anglo-Spanish Wars
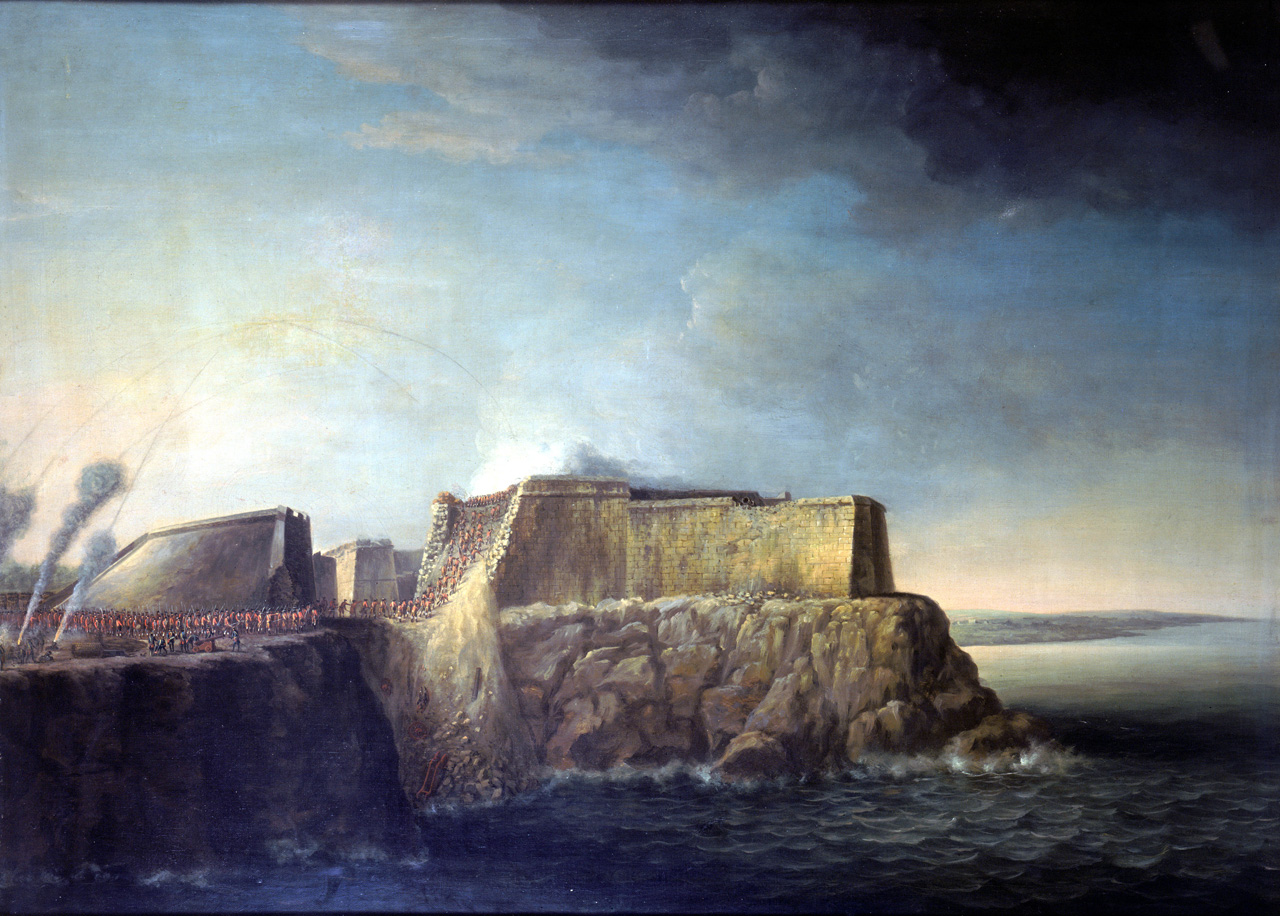
- The Capture of Havana, 1762, Storming of Morro Castle, 30 July, Dominic Serres
Date	1762–1763
Location	Spanish America, Philippines, Spain and Portugal
Result	British victory: Treaty of Paris
Territorial changes	Spain cedes Florida to Great Britain in exchange for return of Manila and Havana; Spain receives Louisiana from France.

Belligerents
Great Britain: British America; Portugal; Pangasinense rebels	Spain; France

Commanders and leaders
John Campbell; George Townshend; John Burgoyne; George Keppel; George Pocock; George Eliott; William Draper; Samuel Cornish; Dawsonne Drake; Count of Lippe; Ralph Burton; John Gorham; Benoni Danks; Diego Silang X Gabriela Silang (executed)	Nicolás de Carvajal; Pedro de Bolea; Manuel Rojo; Simón y Salazar; Juan de Prado; Pedro de Cevallos; José de Velasco; Alejandro O'Reilly; Luis de Velasco †; Gutierre de Hevia

The Anglo-Spanish War (Spanish: Guerra Anglo-Española) was fought between Britain and Spain as part of the Seven Years' War. It lasted from January 1762 until February 1763, when the Treaty of Paris brought it to an end.

For most of the Seven Years' War, Spain remained neutral, turning down offers from the French to join the war on their side. During the war's latter stages, however, with mounting French losses to the British leaving the Spanish Empire vulnerable, King Charles III signalled his intention to enter the war on the side of France. This alliance became the third Family Compact between the two Bourbon kingdoms. After Charles had signed the agreement with France, seized British shipping, and expelled British merchants, Britain declared war on Spain. In August 1762, a British expedition captured Havana then, a month later, captured Manila. Between May and November, three major Franco-Spanish invasions of Portugal, Britain's long time Iberian ally, were defeated. In South America, the Spanish succeeded in capturing a strategically important port, but otherwise the war in South America ended in stalemate.

By the Treaty of Paris, Spain ceded Florida to Britain and returned conquered Portuguese and Brazilian territories to Portugal in exchange for the British handing back Havana and Manila. As compensation for their ally's losses, the French ceded Louisiana to Spain by the Treaty of Fontainebleau.

== Background ==
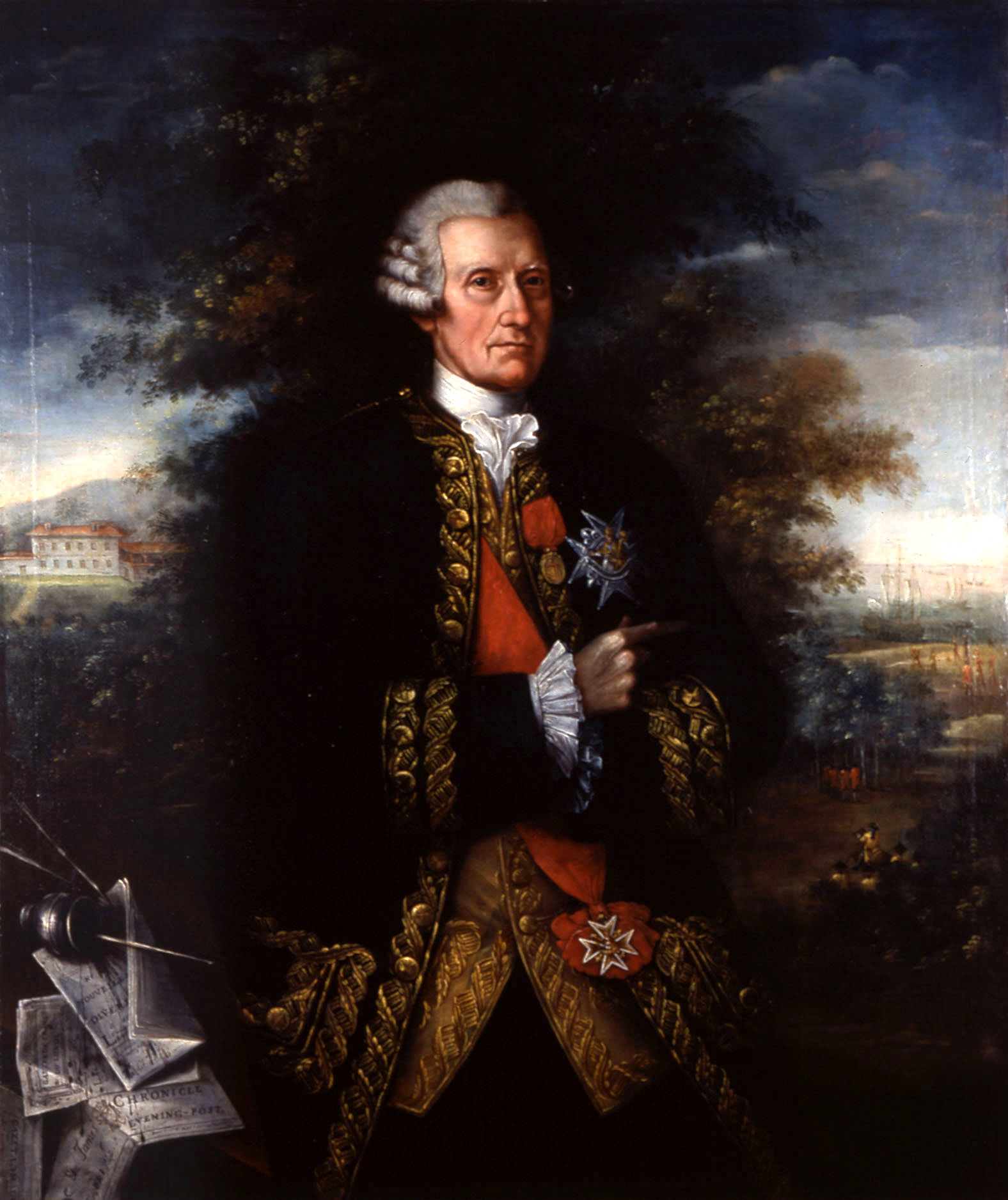
Ricardo Wall managed to keep Spain out of the war, but lost power when Charles III became king.

After war was declared between France and Great Britain in 1756, Spain remained neutral. King Ferdinand VI of Spain's prime minister Ricardo Wall effectively opposed the French party who wanted to enter the war on the side of France. The geopolitical situation changed when Ferdinand VI died in 1759 and was succeeded by his younger half-brother Charles III of Spain. Charles was more ambitious than his complacent brother, and one of the main objects of Charles's foreign policy was the continued survival of Spain as an imperial power and, therefore, as a power to be reckoned with in Europe. He was alarmed by French defeats in the war, suspecting that it would upset the balance of power.

With evidence of growing Franco-Spanish co-operation, Pitt suggested it was only a matter of time before Spain entered the war. The prospect of war with Spain shattered the cabinet unity that had existed up to that point. Pitt strongly advocated a pre-emptive strike which would allow them to capture the annual plate fleet, denying Spain the money required to fund a continuous war. The rest of the cabinet refused, and Pitt resigned. In spite of this war with Spain swiftly became unavoidable; by 1761, France looked as if it was going to lose the war with Britain. Suspecting that a French defeat in the Seven Years' War would upset the balance of power, Charles signed the Family Compact with France (both countries were ruled by branches of the Bourbon family) in August 1761. In December 1761, Spain placed an embargo on British trade, seized British goods in Spain and expelled British merchants. In response to this, Britain declared war on Spain on January 4, 1762.

== War ==
=== Portugal ===
From the British point of view the most pressing issue in the war with Spain was a threatened invasion of Portugal, which although a historic British ally, had, like Spain, remained neutral through most of the conflict. France persuaded a reluctant Spain into attacking Portugal and hoped that this new front would draw away British forces then directed against France. Portugal's long but rugged border with Spain was considered by the French to be vulnerable and easy to overrun (a view not shared by the Spanish), rather than the more complex effort needed to besiege the British fortress of Gibraltar. Spanish forces massed on the Portuguese border, ready to strike. Britain moved swiftly to support their Portuguese allies, shipping in supplies and officers to help co-ordinate the defence.

The original Spanish plan was to take Almeida and then to advance towards the Alentejo and Lisbon, but they switched their target to Porto as it would strike more directly at Anglo-Portuguese commerce. Under the direction of the Marquis of Sarria Spanish troops crossed from Galicia into Northern Portugal capturing several towns. However, the thrust against Porto stalled in difficult terrain and due to the flooding of the River Esla. British troops began arriving that summer with 6,000 coming from Belle Île under Lord Loudoun and a further 2,000 from Ireland. On May 9 Spain invested and captured the border fortress of Almeida. A British-Portuguese counter-attack led by John Burgoyne captured the Spanish town Valencia de Alcántara. French forces began to arrive to support the Spaniards, but like their allies they began to suffer high levels of attrition through disease and desertion. In November with problems with their lines of supply and communication the Bourbon allies withdrew after suffering 25,000 casualties and sued for peace. Despite the large numbers of forces involved, there had been no major battles.

=== South America ===
The Seven Years' War spilled over into Portuguese-Spanish conflict in their South American colonies. The South American war involved small colonial forces taking and retaking remote frontier areas and ended in a stalemate. The only significant action was the First Cevallos expedition, in which Spanish forces captured and then defended the strategically important port town on the River Plate Colony of Sacramento.

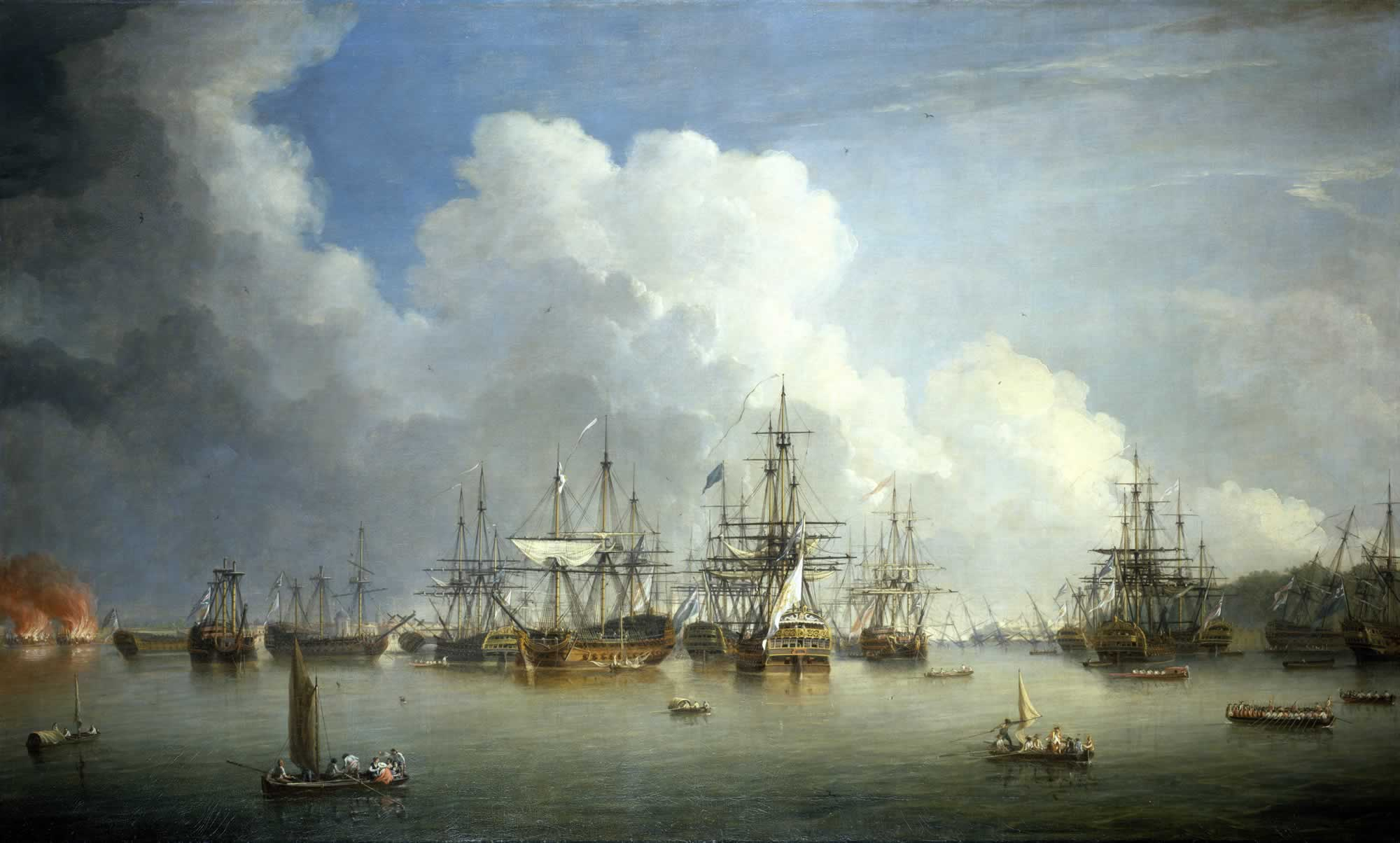
The Captured Spanish Fleet at Havana by Dominic Serres, 1768

=== Cuba ===
In June 1762, British forces from the West Indies landed on the island of Cuba and laid siege to Havana. Although they arrived at the height of the fever season, and previous expeditions against tropical Spanish fortresses failed due, in no small part, to tropical disease, the British government was optimistic of victory— if the troops could catch the Spanish off-guard before they had time to respond. The British commander Albemarle ordered a tunnel to be dug by his sappers so a mine could be planted under the walls of the city's fortress. British troops began to fall ill from disease, but they were boosted by the arrival of 4,000 reinforcements from North America. On 30 July Albemarle ordered the mine to be detonated, and his troops stormed the fortress.

With Havana now in their hands, the British lay poised to strike at other Spanish colonies in the Spanish Main should the war continue for another year. However, they had many casualties in their military hospitals that had yet to recover— and for the moment set about consolidating their hold on the city. During the year of British occupation, commerce in Havana boomed, as the port was opened up to trade with the British Empire rather than the restricted monopoly with Cádiz that had existed before.

=== Central America ===
In early 1762, William Lyttelton, the British governor of Jamaica, sent an expedition to Spanish Nicaragua up the San Juan river with the primary objective of capturing the town of Granada. The primary force and a large group of Miskito Sambu settlers numbering two thousand men and more than fifty boats captured cocoa plantations in the Matina Valley. This was followed by the villages of Jinotega, Acoyapa, Lovigüisca, San Pedro de Lóvago. Soon after on July 26 this force laid siege to the Fortress of the Immaculate Conception. However, the siege was eventually abandoned, ending military operations in Central America.

=== Philippines ===
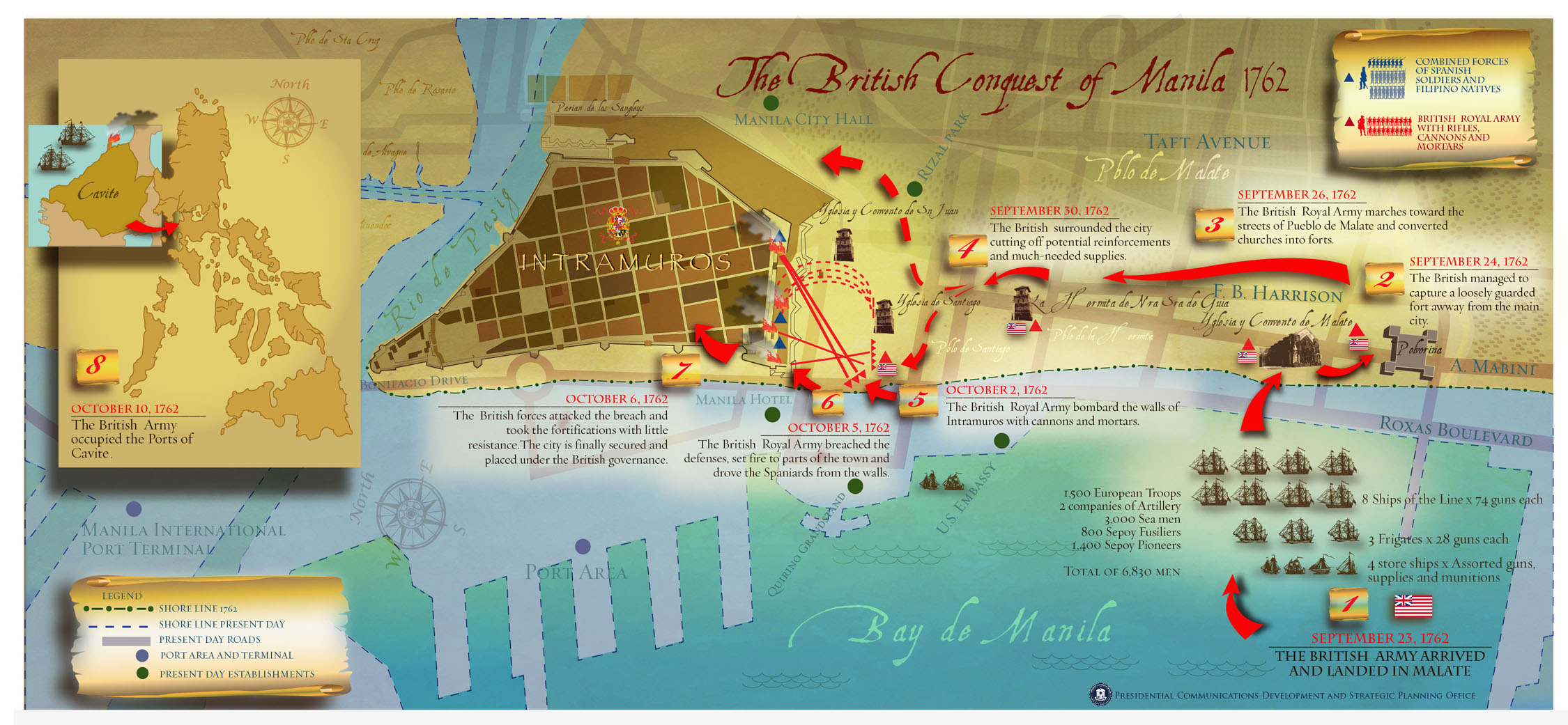
Map of the British conquest of Manila 1762

Almost as soon as war had been declared with Spain, orders had been despatched for a British force at Madras to proceed to the Philippines and capture Manila, with the intention of turning it into a British entrepôt. A combined force of 10,700 men under William Draper set off from India in late July, arriving in Manila Bay in September 1762, with the intention of making Manila. They had to move swiftly before the monsoon season hit. On 6 October the British stormed the city, capturing it thanks to weak Spanish resistance, along with the Archbishop surrendering to avoid further bloodshed. Spanish forces regrouped under Simon Anda, who had escaped from Manila during the siege. Diego Silang, a local Filipino leader, led a revolt against Spanish rule. However, it was sabotaged by Spanish agents and eventually crushed by the Spanish. The British were unable to extend their authority beyond Manila and the nearby port of Cavite. Eventually, the British forces in the region started to suffer from disease and dissensions within the command, further impairing their ability to aid Silang.

News of the city's capture didn't reach Europe until after the Treaty of Paris; as such no provision was made regarding its status. During the siege, the original Spanish lieutenant governor Archbishop Rojo had agreed to a four million Spanish silver dollar payment known as the Manila Ransom, in exchange for sparing the city from further damage and pillage, but this agreement was repudiated, along with all his agreements with the British, by Simon Anda, the leader of the resistance against the British. The full amount was never paid but neither side considered it necessary. Though the expedition failed in securing Manila as a British base, officers were rewarded financially after the capture of the treasure ship Filipina, which was carrying American silver, and when the Santísima Trinidad was captured by a British squadron in the port of Cavite, carrying onboard Chinese goods valued at $1.5 million and the ship itself at $3 million. The eighteen month occupation of Manila ended in the first week of April 1764.

== Aftermath ==
Britain held a dominant position at the negotiations, as they had during the last seven years of the war captured Canada, Guadeloupe, Martinique, Dominica, Pondicherry, Senegal, and Belle Île from the French and Havana and Manila from the Spanish. Only one British territory, Menorca, had fallen into French hands. Spain was prepared to continue the war, which their French allies were opposed to. Bute proposed a suggestion that France cede her remaining North American territory of Louisiana to Spain to compensate Madrid for its losses during the war. This formula was acceptable to the Spanish government, and allowed Britain and France to negotiate with more legroom. Both Bourbon allies considered the treaty that ended the war as being closer to a temporary armistice rather than a genuine final settlement, and William Pitt described it as an "armed truce". Britain had customarily massively reduced the size of its armed forces during peacetime, but during the 1760s a large military establishment was maintained, intended as a deterrent against France and Spain.

== Sources ==
- Anderson, Fred. Crucible of War: The Seven Years' War and the Fate of Empire in British North America, 1754–1766. Faber and Faber, 2001
- Anderson, Fred and Cayton, Andrew. The Dominion of War: Empire and Liberty in North America 1500–2000. Penguin Books, 2005.
- Anderson, Fred. The War that Made America: a Short History of the French and Indian War. Penguin Books, 2006.
- Browning, Reed. The Duke of Newcastle. Yale University Press, 1975.
- Longmate, Norman. Island Fortress: The Defence of Great Britain, 1603–1945. HarperCollins, 1993
- David F. Marley (2008). Wars of the Americas: a chronology of armed conflict in the Western Hemisphere, 1492 to the present. Vol. 1 (2nd ed.). Santa Barbara, California: ABC-CLIO, Inc. p. 441. ISBN 978-1-59884-100-8.
- Rodger NAM. Command of the Ocean: A Naval History of Britain, 1649–1815. Penguin Books, 2006.
- N. A. M. Rodger, The Insatiable Earl: A Life of John Montagu, Fourth Earl of Sandwich (London: HarperCollins, 1993)
- Simms, Brendan (2008). Three Victories and a Defeat: The Rise and Fall of the First British Empire. Penguin Books.
- Tracy, Nicholas (1995). Manila Ransomed. University of Exeter Press. ISBN 0859894266.
