= Piracy on Lake Nicaragua =

- Part of the Golden Age of Piracy and Piracy in the Caribbean
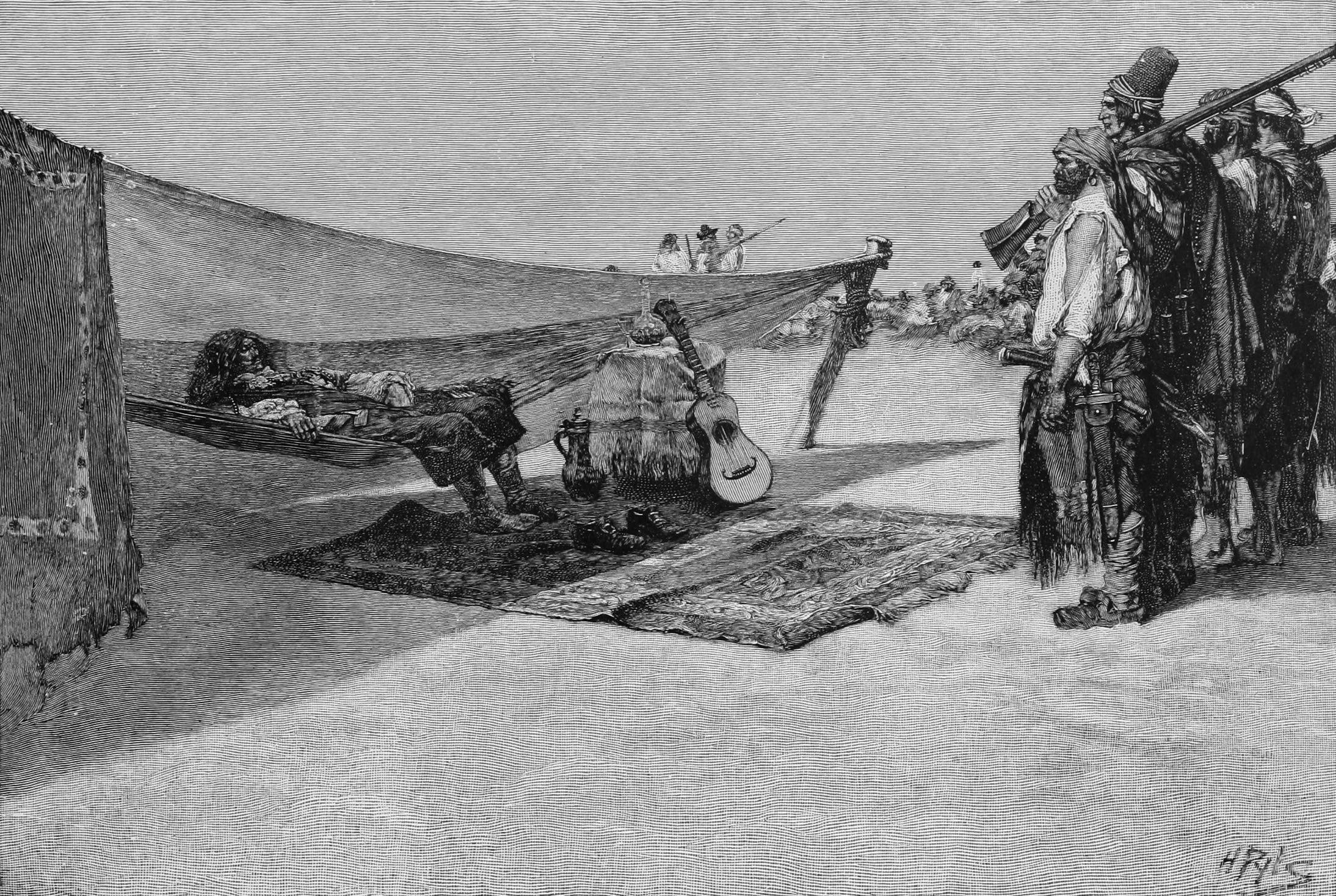
- "Henry Morgan Recruiting for the Attack", by Howard Pyle.
Date	1665–1857
Location	Lake Nicaragua, San Juan River, Nicaragua
Result	Piracy and filibustering suppressed by 1857

Belligerents
Spain; Nicaragua; Costa Rica; El Salvador; Guatemala	West Indies Pirates; American Filibusters

Commanders and leaders
(Spain) Fernando Francisco de Escobedo (Spain) Rafaela Herrera (Nicaragua) Fruto Chamorro (Nicaragua) Laureano Pineda (Costa Rica) José María Cañas	Henry Morgan; William Dampier; William Walker; Charles Henningsen

Between 1665 and 1857, Caribbean pirates and filibusters operated in Lake Nicaragua and the surrounding shores. The Spanish city of Granada, located on the lake, was an important trading centre for much of its early history so it was a prime target for pirates such as Welshman Henry Morgan and freebooters like William Walker.

== History ==
=== 17th century ===
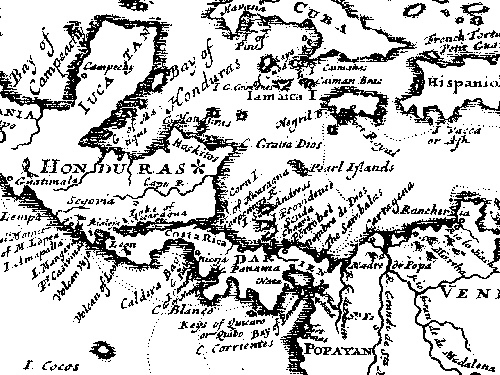
A map from the book A New Voyage Round the World, published in 1697 by the pirate William Dampier.

Lake Nicaragua, then called the Sweet Sea, is the largest freshwater lake in Central America and is connected to the Caribbean Sea by the San Juan River. Due to the destruction of León in 1610, by a volcano, the port of Granada became a main centre of commercial activity and was considered the "jewel" of Spanish colonies in the New World. By 1650 the Golden Age of Piracy had begun in which buccaneers from diverse backgrounds and nations prowled the West Indies. The lake is known to have been controlled by pirates as early as 1665 when Henry Morgan led six shallow draft canoes up the San Juan for an attack on Granada. The canoes were twelve metres long and acquired during an attack on Villahermosa, Mexico, after which Morgan's sailing ships were captured by the Spanish. In June Morgan led his band up the river by night while hiding in the day and when they reached the lake the pirates stealthily crossed it and landed outside town. A general assault was then made on Granada and the Spanish were found completely off guard. After the hostilities had ceased Morgan went after the city's treasury of silver and his men set fire to the buildings and sank all of the Spanish boats found in port.

The pirates escaped with an estimated 500,000 sterling silver pounds before sailing up the Coco River where Morgan allied himself with the Miskito native Americans who participated in the sacking of several Spanish settlements in the area. Pirates also founded their own towns at the same time, among them Pueblo Viejo and Bluefields, the latter named after the Dutch pirate Abraham Blauvelt. Soon after Morgan left, the pirate Captain Gallardito began operating on Lake Nicaragua and in 1670 he successfully overwhelmed the garrison of Granada. Following that incident the Spanish resorted to fortifying their territory. At one area southeast of Granada the Spanish Army Captain Fernando Francisco de Escobedo began building the Fortress of the Immaculate Conception in 1673 next to a rapid in the San Juan River. The structure, made of stone, was completed in 1675 and it eventually became an important asset in keeping pirates out of the lake, even though it failed in its first test in 1685 when the English buccaneer William Dampier bypassed the fort by landing on Nicaragua's Pacific coast. Dampier then went on to attack Granada after marching overland and he burnt the colony down again on 8 September. Soon after, the city of Leon, was attacked and destroyed by Dampier as well.

=== 18th century ===
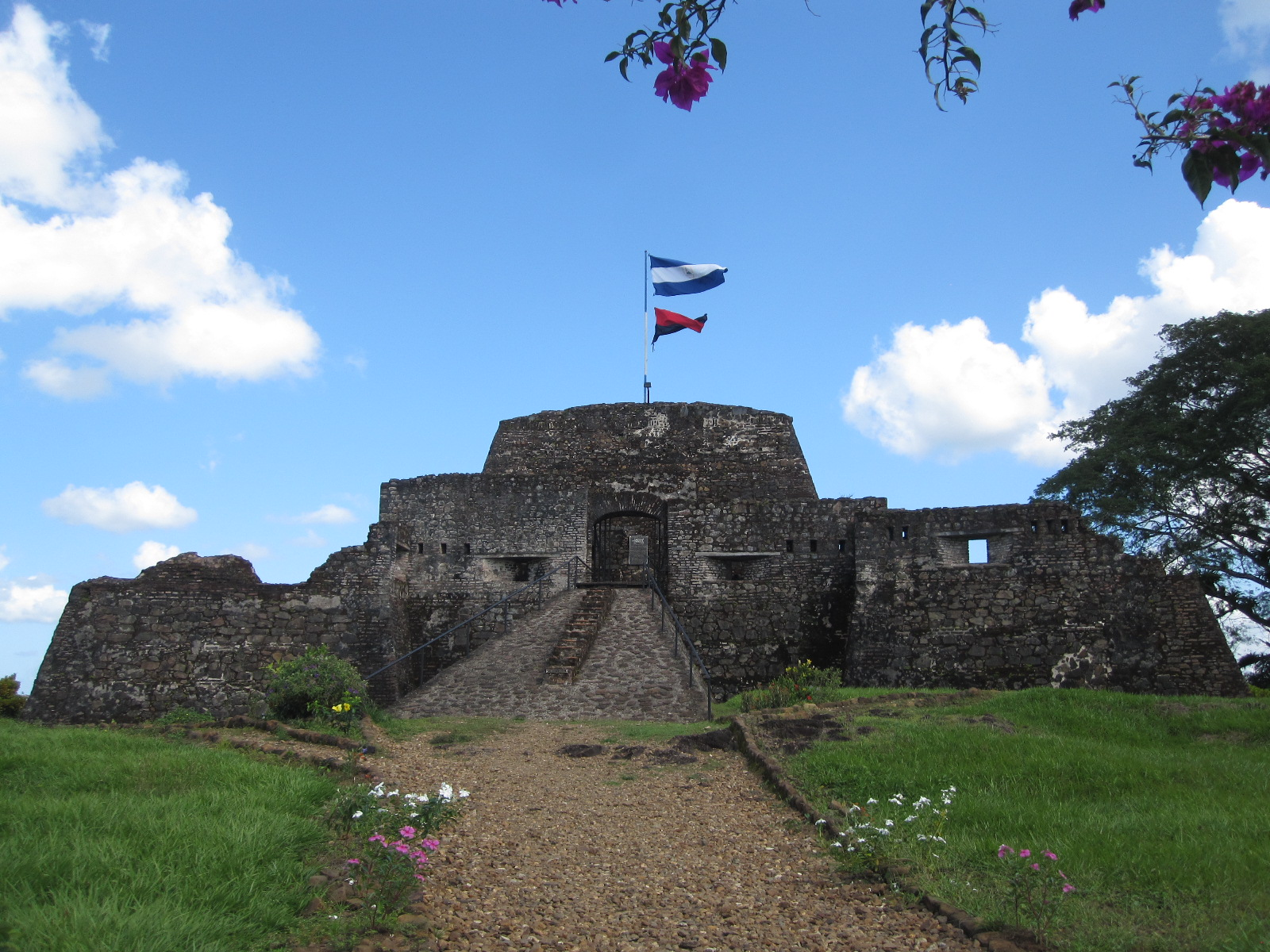
The Fortress of the Immaculate Conception in February 2011.

Since the establishment of British colonies in the West Indies, most notably Jamaica, the constant conflict between Britain and Spain created a haven for pirates who also served as privateers in war time. Pirates and Miskito Sambu filibusters attacked the Fortress of the Immaculate Conception repeatedly during the 18th century. Perhaps the most famous battle occurred in 1762 during the Seven Years' War. In the 1740s, the British had allied themselves with the Miskito Sambus, who were an ethnic group who were descended from escaped African slaves from Spanish settlements who intermarried with Native Americans; when war broke out in 1762 with Spain, the British and the Miskito began attacking Spanish settlements throughout Central America. Eventually a force of 2,000 Britons and Sambus sailed up the San Juan in more than fifty boats and canoes where they laid siege to about 100 Spaniards in the fortress on 26 July. The garrison commander had died only recently leaving his daughter, the nineteen-year-old Rafaela Herrera and a lieutenant, to lead the defense. Herrera shot the British commander herself on the first day of the battle and for six days afterward the two sides duelled with cannons. Occasionally the British and Sambus would charge forward for a close quarters engagement though they were beaten back every time with heavy losses. A second British expedition was launched in 1780 and it successfully captured the fort.

=== 19th century ===
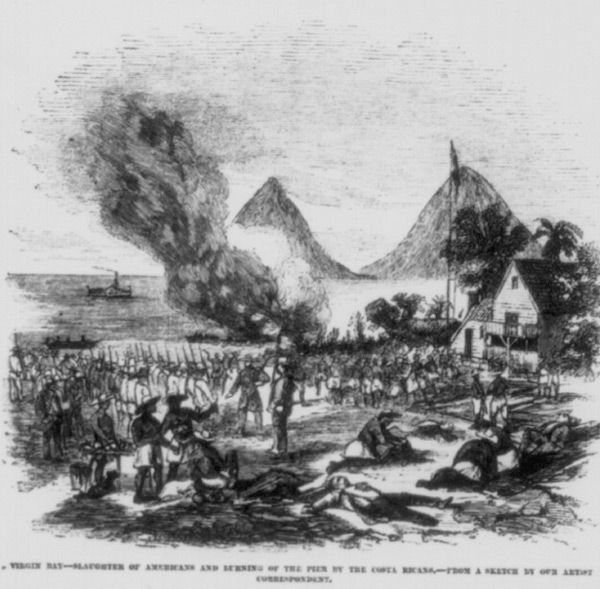
A sketch of the 1856 Costa Rican attack at the port of Rivas on Lake Nicaragua.

Filibustering became popular in the 19th century, primarily in Latin America (the term originated from the Spanish word filibustero which meant pirate or buccaneer). Perhaps the most famous filibustering expedition was William Walker's Conquest of Nicaragua in 1855, by which time the country was independent from Spanish rule. A civil war had broken out in 1854 between liberal and conservative forces; the conservatives, or Legitimists, held Granada while the liberals held Leon. Initially Walker had been commissioned by the liberal government of President General Francisco Castellón to bring 300 men to aid in the war against the Legitimists, but his real intentions were to take over the country, as he had in Baja California and Sonora, Mexico. Walker sailed from San Francisco in May 1855 with sixty men and when he arrived in Nicaragua his small army of filibusters was increased by about 300 Americans and locals, including the pirate Charles Frederick Henningsen. After a series of battles against both the Legitimists and the liberals, Walker established himself as the ruler of Nicaragua and even received recognition from the American President Franklin Pierce. Recognition didn't last long though, when Walker seized property belonging to Cornelius Vanderbilt's Accessory Transit Company, the United States government withdrew their support.

Soon after that the filibusters engaged in a campaign which ended when 4,000 Salvadoran and Guatemalan troops besieged Granada. Charles Frederick Henningsen was in command of the city at the time and he only had a few hundred men so there was no choice but to retreat to Lake Nicaragua after burning Granada for a final time. When the city was in flames, Henningsen began his retreat on 14 December 1856, leaving behind a message on a lance which read "Here was Granada". William Walker surrendered to the United States Navy commander Charles Henry Davis in the sloop-of-war USS St. Mary's on 1 May 1857 and he was later executed for piracy by the government of Honduras.

== See also ==
- Republic of Baja California
- Republic of Sonora
