= Boca de Sábalos =

Coordinates: 11°02′35″N 84°28′24″W

Boca de Sábalos is a jungle port village of about 2000 people at the confluence of Río Sábalos and Río San Juan, and is the capital of the municipality of El Castillo, Nicaragua. Once a timber boomtown, now African palm, orange and cacao plantations, along with an eco lodge and hotel, are making it a tourist destination, is a world class place for tarpon fishing, the area also host a few private natural reserve such as Reserva Silvestre Privada Montecristo a great place for birds and wildlife in the Río San Juan Department.
