= Fortress of the Immaculate Conception =

Fort in El Castillo, Nicaragua

- El Castillo de la Inmaculada Concepción
- El Castillo, Río San Juan Department, Nicaragua
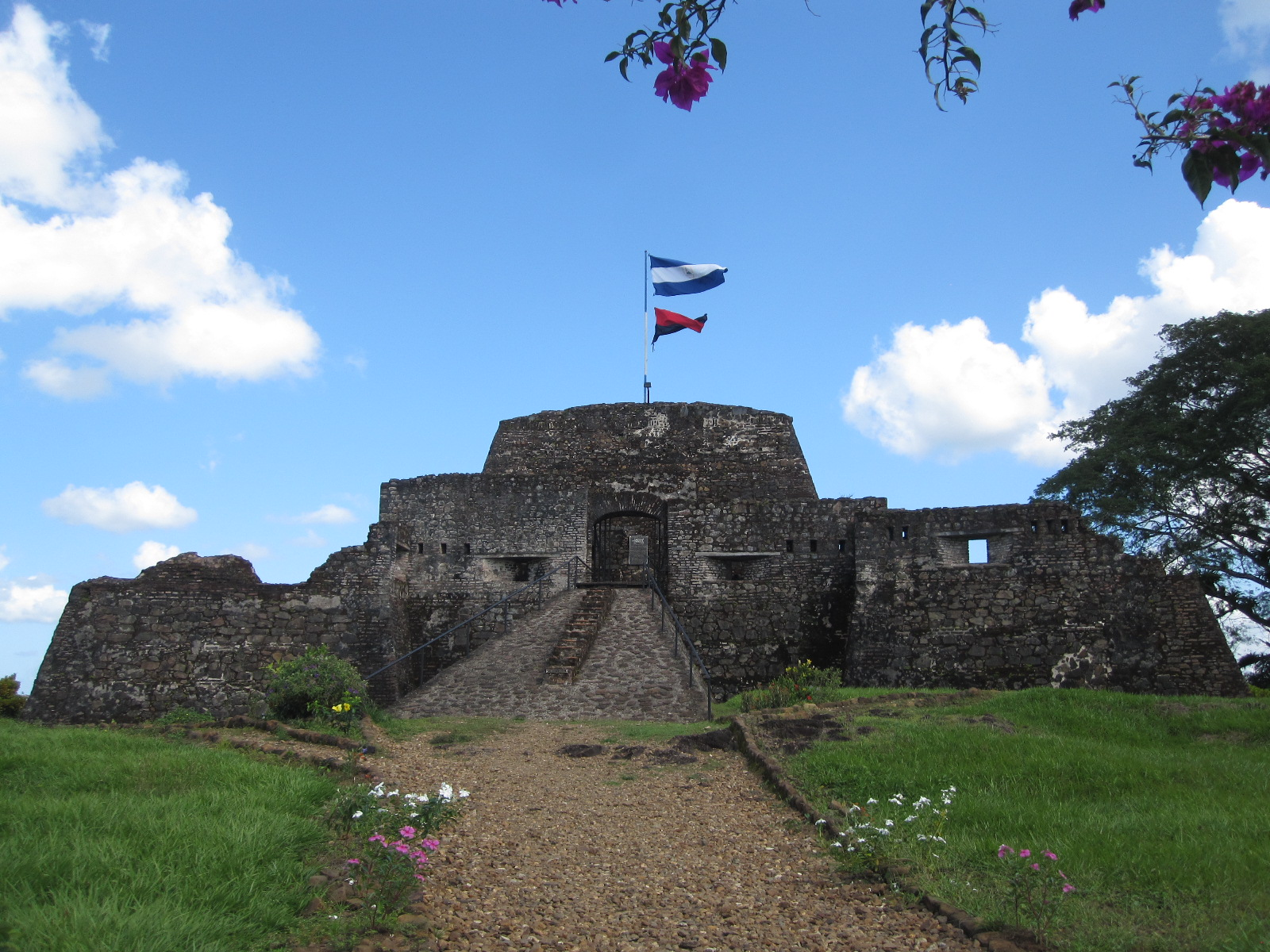
- Fortress of the Immaculate Conception

Site information
- Type: Bastion, Fortress
- Controlled by: Nicaragua
- Open to the public: Yes

Location
- Location of the Fortress of the Immaculate Conception within Nicaragua
- Coordinates: 11.0192°N 84.3964°W

Site history
- Built: 1673–1675
- Built by: Martín de Andújar Cantos
- In use: 1675–present
- Materials: Stone
- Battles/wars: Battle for the Río San Juan de Nicaragua (1762); San Juan Expedition (1780)

Garrison information
- Past commanders: Lieutenant Colonel Don José de Herrera y Sotomayor (1762)

The Fortress of the Immaculate Conception, (Spanish: El Castillo de la Inmaculada Concepción) is a fortification located on the southern bank of the San Juan River (Río San Juan), in the village of El Castillo in southern Nicaragua. The fortress is situated approximately 6 kilometers from the border with Costa Rica, at the Raudal del Diablo rapids of the San Juan River. It was completed in 1675 as part of a series of fortifications along the San Juan River, to defend against pirate attacks upon the city of Granada (which can be reached by navigating upstream from the Caribbean Sea along the San Juan River into Lake Nicaragua). The settlement of El Castillo and its fortress continued to be strategically important to the Captaincy General of Guatemala until the late 18th century.

An important historic landmark of Nicaragua, the fortress is on a list of sites as an initial stage in achieving World Heritage Site status with the United Nations Educational, Scientific and Cultural Organization (UNESCO).

== History ==
=== 16th century ===
Gil González Dávila was a Spanish conquistador and the first European to arrive in present-day Nicaragua. After discovering the "freshwater sea" (Lake Nicaragua) on January 21, 1522, he speculated that it discharged into the Caribbean Sea. Francisco Hernández de Córdoba was another Spanish conquistador who founded the city of Granada (the first Spanish colonial city in Central America) on the shore of Lake Nicaragua on December 8, 1524. Under orders from Hernández de Córdoba, an expedition that included Hernando de Soto, Ruy Díaz (the first mayor of Granada) and Sebastián de Belalcázar explored Lake Nicaragua. They succeeded in locating a waterway running eastwards towards the Caribbean Sea, but reported it to be not navigable. Martin Estete, a citizen of Granada, finally discovered the outlet of Lake Nicaragua in 1528 and named it the Río San Juan. Estete was unable to navigate past the rapids however, because the river was low at that time. In 1529, Diego Machuca became the first man to reach the Caribbean Sea from Lake Nicaragua. After circumnavigating the lake in a group of boats, Machuca and his team entered the San Juan River. From here, Machuca led a group of 200 men who advanced by land, taking the same course as the boats. Machuca named the rapids (the rapids which stopped Estete the year before) after himself, and named the port at the mouth of the river San Juan de las Perlas (later known as San Juan del Norte, and now known as San Juan de Nicaragua).

=== 17th century ===
By the late 17th century, the success of the city of Granada had made it a victim of pirate attacks, the first of which was in 1670 by the pirate Gallardino. In response to this and other pirate attacks, the Spanish colonial authorities constructed the Fortress of the Immaculate Conception as a means to protect the citizens of Granada from future attacks.

Captain General Fernando Francisco de Escobedo, who was also at that time Governor of Yucatán, visited the area from January – February 1673. Escobedo was accompanied by Martín de Andújar Cantos, a military engineer who was responsible for the selection of the site. Escobedo and Andújar Cantos arrived at San Juan del Norte, then travelled upstream along the San Juan River and into Lake Nicaragua. Upon their return to Granada, they set about planning the construction of definitive fortifications along the San Juan River. They ultimately decided to build the fortress at the Raudal del Diablo, (known at that time as the Raudal de Santa Cruz) atop the ruins of the previous Fuerte de Santa Cruz, which dated from the time of King Philip III of Spain. Construction of the fortress, initially named Fortaleza de la Limpia Pura e Inmaculada Concepción, was begun on March 10, 1673, and completed in 1675. Despite the construction of the fortress, buccaneer William Dampier plundered the city and set it on fire on April 8, 1685.

=== 18th century ===
On the morning of July 26, 1762, a combined British and Miskito Sambu expeditionary force laid siege to the fortress in what would later be called the Battle for the Río San Juan de Nicaragua. The attacking force consisted of two thousand men and more than fifty boats, while the soldiers at the fortress numbered only around a hundred. The garrison commander, Lieutenant Colonel Don José de Herrera y Sotomayor, had died unexpectedly on July 15, only 11 days earlier. Inspired by acts of heroism displayed by Herrera's 19-year-old daughter Rafaela (which included killing the British commander of the expeditionary force), pro tempore garrison commander Lieutenant Juan de Aguilar y Santa Cruz led the defenders to victory in a battle that lasted six days. The British finally lifted their siege and retreated on August 3, 1762.

After Spain entered the American Revolutionary War in 1779, Major General John Dalling, the British governor and commander-in-chief of Jamaica, proposed a second expedition to Nicaragua. The goal was to sail up the San Juan River to Lake Nicaragua and capture the town of Granada, which would effectively cut Spanish America in half as well as provide potential access to the Pacific Ocean. During this expedition, which took place in 1780 and later became known as the San Juan Expedition, Colonel John Polson and Captain Horatio Nelson led a British attack against the fortress. At the time, the Spanish garrison consisted of 228 men under the command of Juan de Ayssa (who served as Governor of Nicaragua from 1783 to 1787). The expeditionary force succeeded in capturing the fortress on April 29, 1780, despite the fact that it consisted of only 200 men. The 22-year-old Nelson, in command of HMS Hinchinbrook, was responsible for leading his men through dense jungle to attack the fortress from a hill in the rear. The British captured the fortress and occupied it for nine months, finally abandoning it in January 1781. The hill is named Lomas de Nelson to this day.

=== 21st century ===
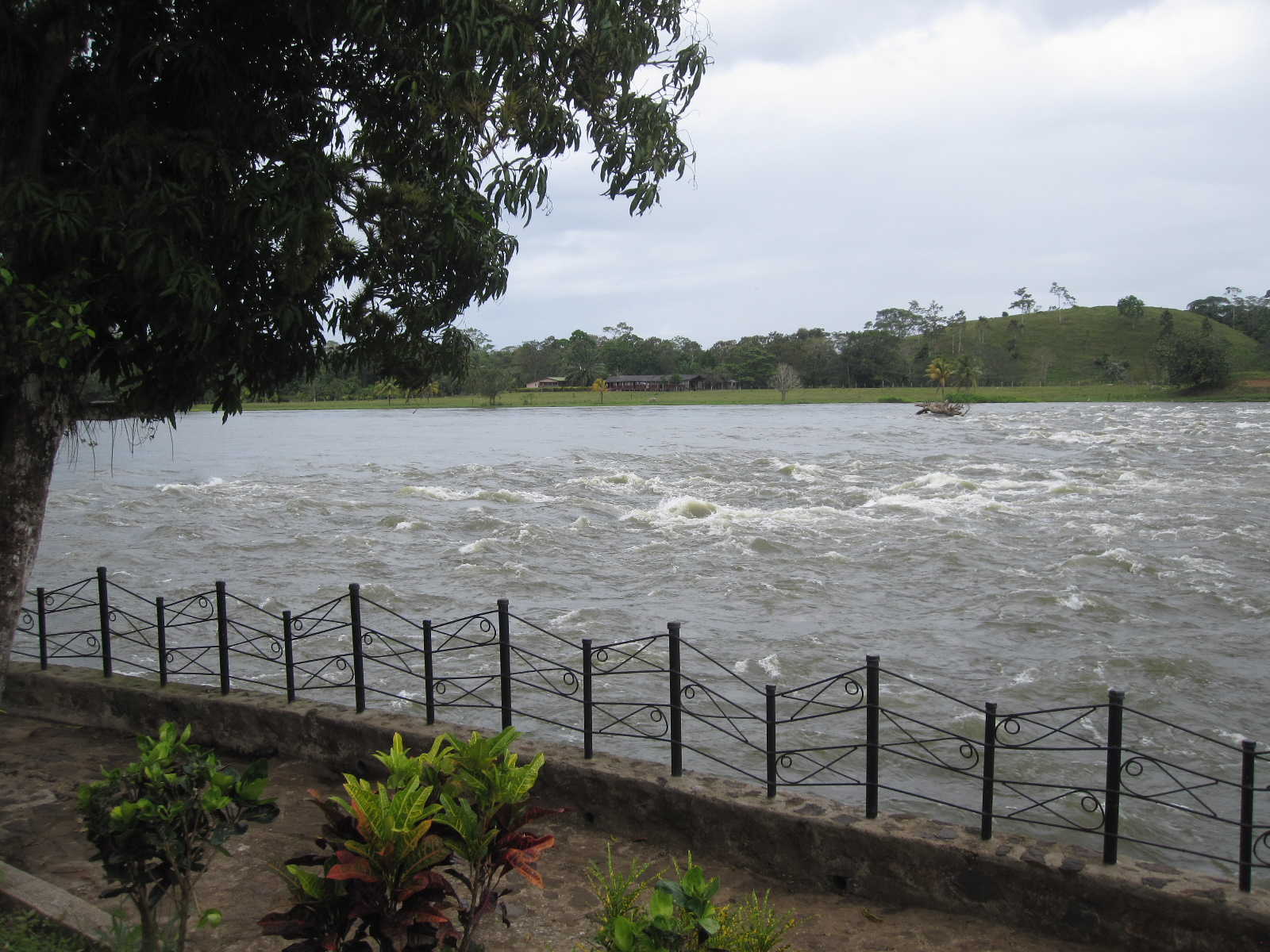
View of the Raudal del Diablo rapids of the San Juan River from the village of El Castillo in southern Nicaragua.

The Fortress of the Immaculate Conception is a historic landmark of Nicaragua, which currently houses a museum and library. Since 1995, it has been on a "tentative list" of important Nicaraguan cultural sites with the United Nations Educational, Scientific and Cultural Organization (UNESCO) as a preliminary to nomination for consideration as a World Heritage Site. The submission notes that the fortress is in a protected area, the Indio Maíz Biological Reserve.

== See also ==
- Piracy on Lake Nicaragua
- Piracy in the Caribbean
