= Joseph Windham =

Joseph Windham (1739–1810) was an English antiquarian.

== Life ==
Born at Twickenham on 21 August 1739, in a house where later lived Richard Owen Cambridge, he was related to the Windham family of Norfolk, his father John Windham (later Windham-Bowyer) being son of William Windham senior. He was educated at Eton College and went on to Christ's College, Cambridge, but did not graduate. He was one of William Benson Earle's chosen companions on the grand tour, the other being Henry Penruddocke Wyndham.

In 1769, Windham returned from an extended tour through France, Italy, Istria, and Switzerland. He was elected a fellow of the Society of Antiquaries of London on 6 April 1775, and of the Royal Society on 8 November 1781; he was also elected a member of the Society of Dilettanti in 1779. He died at Earsham House, Norfolk, on 21 September 1810. He had married, in 1769, Charlotte, daughter of William de Grey, 1st Baron Walsingham.

== Works ==
Windham made drawings of natural objects and antiquities. He was also an Italian scholar, had some knowledge of natural history, and acquired a noted antiquarian library.

His only publication under his own name was Observations upon a Passage in Pliny's Natural History, relating to the Temple of Diana at Ephesus, in Archæologia, vol. vi.

While in Rome he made many sketches and plans of the baths, which he presented to Charles Cameron, by whom they were published in The Baths of the Romans Explained and Illustrated.

Windham also contributed much of the letterpress for it, as well as most of the text of the second volume of Antiquities of Ionia, published in 1797 by the Society of Dilettanti. He assisted James Stuart in the second volume of his Antiquities of Athens.

== Notes ==
Attribution

This article incorporates text from a publication now in the public domain: Lee, Sidney, ed. (1900). "Windham, Joseph". Dictionary of National Biography. Vol. 62. London: Smith, Elder & Co.
