= San Juan Expedition (1780) =

Expedition in the American War of Independence

Coordinates: 11°01′09″N 84°23′47″W

- Part of the American Revolutionary War
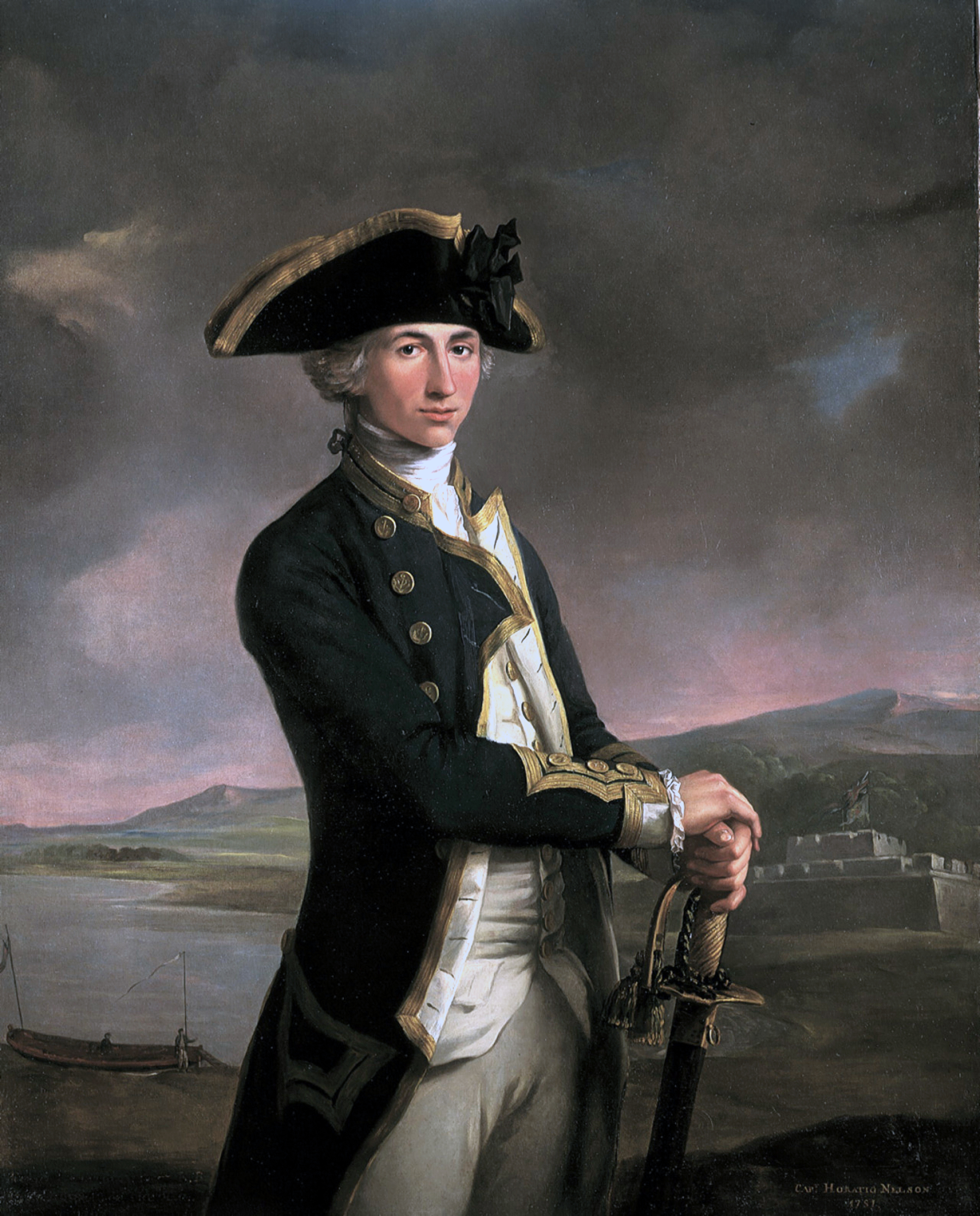
- Captain Horatio Nelson, painted by John Francis Rigaud in 1781, with Fort San Juan in the background.
Date	17 March – 8 November 1780 (7 months, 3 weeks and 1 day)
Location	San Juan River
Result	Spanish victory

Belligerents
Spain: New Spain; (Spain) Captaincy General of Guatemala	Great Britain Mosquitia

Commanders and leaders
Matías de Gálvez; Juan de Ayssa (surrendered)	John Polson †; Horatio Nelson

Strength
160 regulars and militia (Fort San Juan); 500 militia (Granada's outskirts)	3,000 regulars, militia, sailors and irregulars 1 frigate 2 brigs 3 sloops 1 tender 1 transport

Casualties and losses
Unknown killed or wounded 45 captured	2,500 killed or died of disease 2 ships grounded

The San Juan Expedition took place between March and November 1780 during the American War of Independence when a British force under the command of John Polson and Captain Horatio Nelson landed in Mosquitia. Their aim was to sail up the San Juan River to capture the strategically crucial towns of Granada and León, located on the north-western shore of Lake Nicaragua.

Despite an initial success in the capture of the Fortress of the Immaculate Conception, Polson's force never reached Lake Nicaragua and, decimated by yellow fever, was forced to return to Jamaica. The campaign ended in total failure and cost the lives of more than 2,500 men, making it the costliest British disaster of the entire war.

== Background ==
After Spain entered the American Revolutionary War in 1779, Major-General John Dalling, the governor of Jamaica, proposed a military expedition against the Spanish province of Nicaragua, belonging then to the Captaincy General of Guatemala, a dependency of the Viceroyalty of New Spain. The main objective of the expedition was to capture the town of Granada, effectively cutting Spanish America in half and giving Great Britain access to the Pacific Ocean. "The colours of England, were, in their imagination, already in the walls of Lima."

== Expedition ==
The expedition, consisting of the transport Penelope, two brigs, three sloops, and a tender, the Royal George, sailed from Jamaica on 3 February 1780, escorted by the 21-year-old Captain Horatio Nelson in the 28-gun HMS Hinchinbrook. Nelson was the highest-ranking officer present, but his authority was limited to naval operations. The overall commander was Captain (local rank of major) John Polson, who had at his disposal about 3,000 men, including 100 regulars of the 60th Royal American Regiment under himself, 140 of the 79th Liverpool Blues under Captain Richard Bulkeley, 240 Royal Jamaica Volunteers under Major James Macdonald, 250 members of the Jamaica Legion, and 125 of the Royal Batteaux Corps, plus an unspecified number of black volunteers.

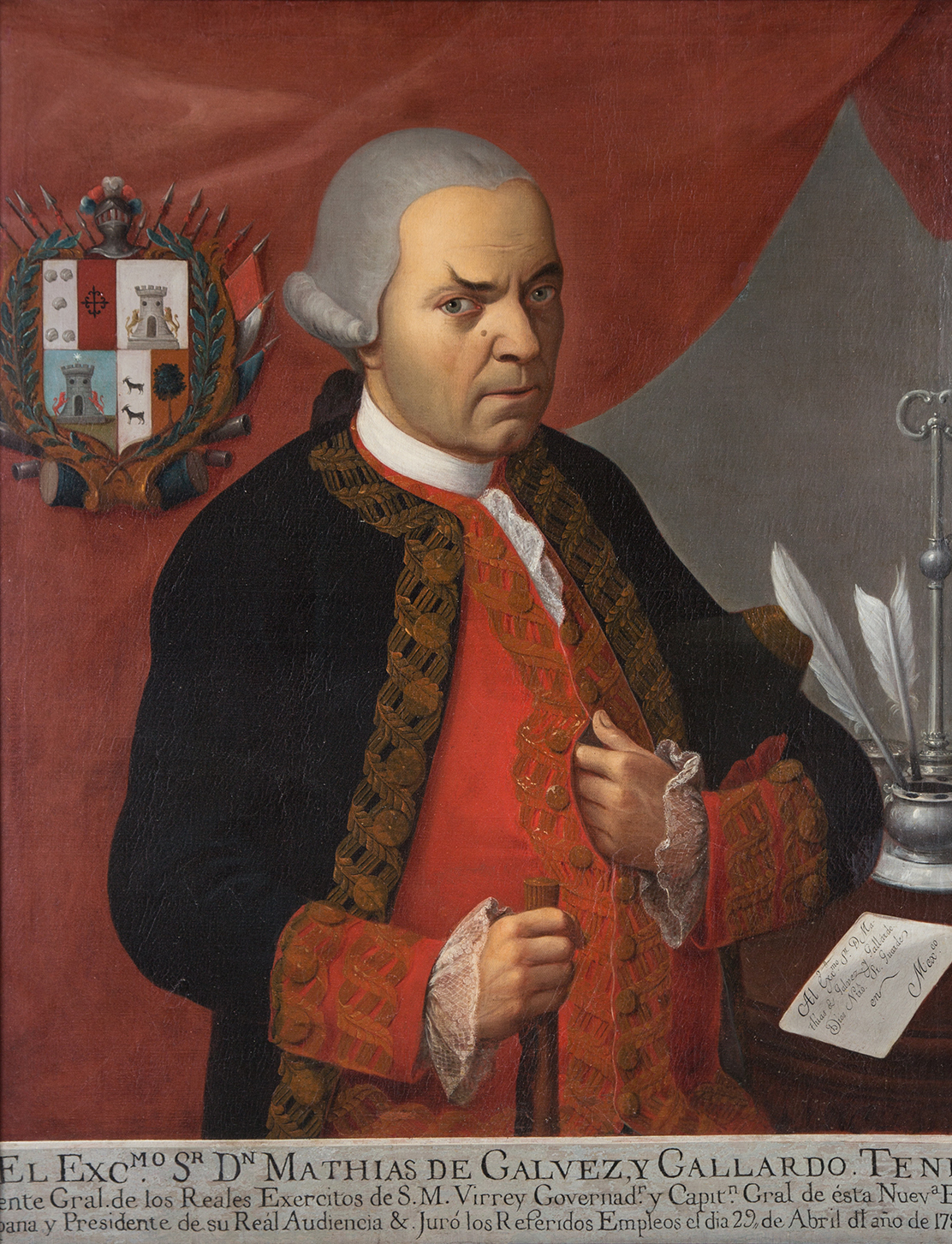
Matías de Gálvez, governor of the Captaincy General of Guatemala

On 24 March, after many delays awaiting the arrival of several Miskito bowmen under Major James Lawrie, which failed to appear, the expedition anchored off San Juan del Norte. Three days later all Polson's troops were assembled aboard boats and advanced upriver divided in two contingents. On 9 April, Nelson, in the first hand-to-hand combat of his career, led an assault which captured a small Spanish battery on Bartola Island.

Five miles (8 km) upstream was Fort San Juan, with about 160 armed defenders of whom only 60 were soldiers, which was besieged beginning on 13 April. Because of poor planning and lost supplies, the British soon began to run low on ammunition for the cannons as well as rations for the men. After the tropical rains started on 20 April, men began to sicken and die, probably of malaria and dysentery, and maybe of typhoid fever, Nelson was one of the first to become ill, and he was shipped downriver on 28 April, the day before the Spanish under Juan de Ayssa, devoid of ammunition, food and water, surrendered the fort.

The British troops, unable to advance despite the arrival of 450 British reinforcements on 15 May, remained in occupation of the fort for six months, during which time they perished by the hundreds, while Viceroy Matías de Gálvez was able to fortify the mouth of Lake Nicaragua. The Spanish gained in strength, thanks to assistance from San Miguel, Choluteca and other adjoining provinces, while sickness continued to take a heavy toll among the British troops, forcing the order for withdrawal to be given on 30 November.

== Aftermath ==
The Spanish reoccupied the remains of the fort, which the British had blown up on departure. Despite having surrendered it, Don Juan de Ayssa was promoted to lieutenant colonel, as was recorded in the Royal Order of 12 June 1781: he had alerted the other garrisons in the area, bravely defended the fort, suffered hardships as a prisoner of war, and contributed greatly to creating difficulties for the British operations. Taken prisoner to Jamaica, he was freed at the end of the war and rose to become governor of Nicaragua in 1783.
