= Rafaela Herrera =

Nicaraguan heroine (1742–1805)

Rafaela de Herrera y Torreynosa
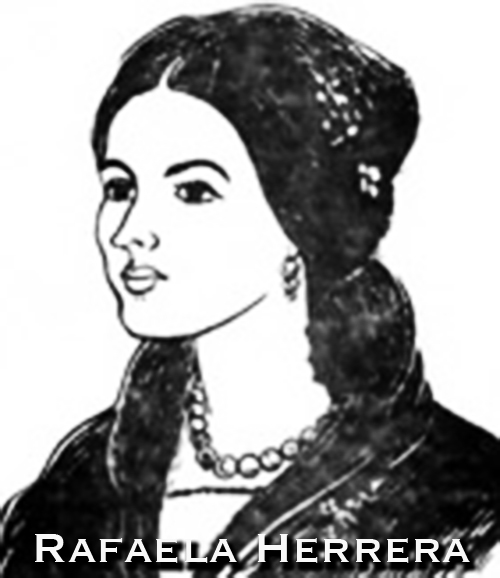
- Rafaela de Herrera y Torreynosa
- Born: Rafaela de Herrera y Torreynosa; August 6, 1742; Cartagena de Indias, Viceroyalty of New Granada, Spanish Empire
- Died: 1805 (aged 59–60); Granada, Captaincy General of Guatemala, Spanish Empire
- Known for: Battle for the Río San Juan de Nicaragua (1762)
- Spouse: Pablo Mora
- Children: five, names unknown

Rafaela de Herrera y Torreynosa (1742–1805) was a criolla from what is now Colombia. She is considered a national heroine of Nicaragua, due to her actions in the defense of the Fortress of the Immaculate Conception during the Battle for the Río San Juan de Nicaragua in 1762 against the British forces.

== Early life ==
Rafaela Herrera was born on August 6, 1742, in Cartagena de Indias, in the Viceroyalty of New Granada of the Spanish Empire. She was the illegitimate and only child of Lieutenant Colonel Don José de Herrera y Sotomayor (died 15 July 1762) and Felipa Torreynosa, who was reportedly a criolla or possibly a mulatto woman. She was raised in Cartagena by another woman—Doña Maria Felipe de Uriarte—who was widely considered to be her de facto mother.

Herrera's father was a captain of artillery who had been engaged in heavy combat against British forces under the command of Vice Admiral Edward Vernon during the Battle of Cartagena de Indias in 1741. At the time of her birth the following year, he was Commander of the Castillo de San Sebastián del Pastelillo, a fortress on the outskirts of Cartagena de Indias. She was also the granddaughter of Brigadier Don Juan de Herrera y Sotomayor (died 1732), a prominent military engineer of Cartagena de Indias and founder of the Academia Militar de Matemáticas de América (Military Academy of Mathematics of America), and who also served as Governor of Río de la Plata from 1682 to 1691.

In raising his daughter, Lieutenant Colonel Herrera had tried to educate her not only in military exercises such as the handling of the cannon, but also in the principles of honour, faith and patriotism. Rafaela and her father left Cartagena in 1753, when the latter was assigned as Commander of the garrison at the Fortress of the Immaculate Conception on the San Juan River in the province of Nicaragua, in relief of Lieutenant Colonel Don Juan Antonio Alonso de Arce.

== The Battle for the Río San Juan de Nicaragua ==
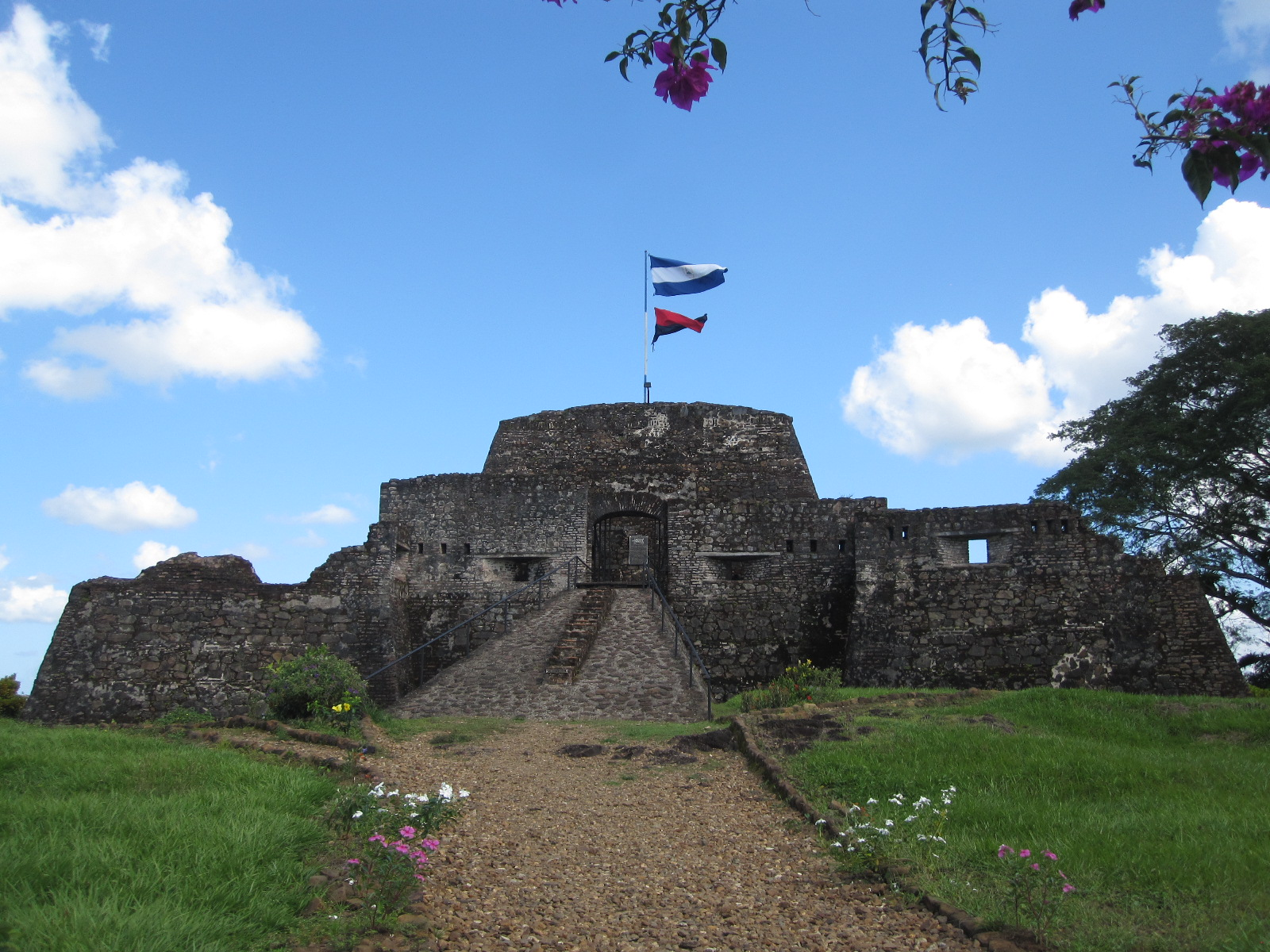
Fortress of the Immaculate Conception

Flag used in the Spanish coastal fortifications from 1701 to 1785

Because it represented a potential route between the Atlantic and Pacific oceans as well as the possibility of expanding their settlements in Central America beyond Mosquitia, Spanish Nicaragua was a major target for British attacks during the 18th century. In 1762, William Lyttelton, the British governor and commander-in-chief of Jamaica, proposed a naval expedition to Nicaragua. The goal was to sail up the San Juan River to Lake Nicaragua and capture the town of Granada, which would effectively cut Spanish America in half as well as provide potential access to the Pacific Ocean. The first and greatest obstacle to success was to capture the Fortress of the Immaculate Conception.

The conflict began in June 1762, during the administration of interim Governor of Nicaragua Melchor Vidal de Lorca y Villena. Supplied by the British expeditionary force, a group of Miskito Sambu attacked cocoa plantations in the Valley of Matina. The following month they raided many undefended settlements in Nicaragua, including Jinotega, Acoyapa, Lovigüisca, San Pedro de Lóvago, the mission of Apompuá near Juigalpa and Muy Muy, burning and looting the villages as well as capturing some Spanish prisoners. Many of the people the Miskito captured were sold into slavery in colonial Jamaica.

The combined British and Miskito Sambu expeditionary force headed towards the Fortress of the Immaculate Conception on the San Juan River in July. The attacking force consisted of two thousand men and more than fifty boats, while the soldiers at the fortress numbered only around a hundred. To make matters worse, the invaders threatened the region at a time when the commander of the fortress, Don José de Herrera y Sotomayor, had recently died on July 15. Lieutenant Don Juan de Aguilar y Santa Cruz has assumed temporary command of the garrison.

The British siege of the Fortress of the Immaculate Conception began in earnest on July 29, 1762, at approximately 4:00 a.m., when a cannon shot and sustained musket fire were heard downstream, near the Spanish sentry post. The garrison immediately took up arms, readied the artillery, and fortified positions where an attack seemed imminent. Acting commander Alférez Juan de Aguilar y Santa Cruz, who had assumed command following the death of José de Herrera y Sotomayor earlier that month, dispatched a reconnaissance boat to investigate. The Spanish encountered enemy forces near the sentry post and quickly withdrew under fire. Although no casualties were suffered, the Spanish boat was abandoned, and its crew returned to the fortress overland.

Later that morning, seven large British piraguas accompanied by numerous smaller boats approached from downstream. After exchanging fire—including nine cannon shots—the enemy landed troops on the southern bank, using the jungle to shield themselves from the fortress's guns. British detachments also moved upstream on the northern side, advancing through the forest under cover.

By mid-afternoon, British forces were observed in a cordon stretching along the riverbanks. During this time, two allied indigenous Caribs attempted to return to a nearby ranch to retrieve their wives but encountered a large group of English and Zambo soldiers. From the fortress, Rafaela Herrera, the daughter of the late commandant requested and received permission to fire a cannon. Her shot, loaded with ball and shrapnel, struck with remarkable accuracy, scattering the enemy and reportedly killing several, including a prominent British officer. One of the Caribs managed to return to the fortress and confirmed the extent of the destruction.

That night, British forces began sustained musket fire against the fortress, hoisting seven English flags and maintaining pressure throughout the night.

On July 30, the British maintained their siege positions, now reinforced into seven distinct camps with sentinels and firing posts. The Spanish responded with cannon fire, which caused the enemy to pull back slightly. Later that morning, a British officer accompanied by an interpreter approached under a white flag, demanding the surrender of the fortress and offering safe conduct in exchange. Alférez Aguilar replied that he could not capitulate without superior orders and was prepared to resist. A brief truce was agreed to retrieve artillery pieces left in the nearby residence of the deceased commandant.

Later that day, the British envoy returned, warning the Spanish not to open the gates again or risk massacre. Aguilar replied firmly that the territory and fortress belonged to the King of Spain, not to the King of England, and warned the British against further hostilities or destruction of local plantations. The night passed without renewed attacks.

On the morning of July 31, the British again approached under a white flag. The interpreter relayed threats from the British commander, warning that the fortress would be stormed within three days if it was not surrendered. Aguilar refused, stating he would not yield without orders from his superiors or unless killed in action. The British envoy departed, and shortly afterward, the British raised a black flag, signalling renewed hostilities. They opened fire, which was met with a vigorous Spanish artillery and musket response, continuing throughout the night.

Hostilities persisted into August 1 and 2, with constant exchanges of fire. However, by the evening of August 2, Spanish defenders noticed a significant decrease in enemy activity. At around 5:00 p.m., a small sparrow entered the fortress chapel and briefly landed on the image of Our Lady of the Immaculate Conception, the fortress's patroness. The bird circled the chapel and departed—an event the defenders interpreted as a favourable omen.

On August 3, minimal firing occurred. Spanish lookouts observed that while fires still burned in the enemy's upstream camps, few soldiers remained visible. Only scattered sentinels were seen near the fortress, while downstream, British forces were spotted cutting down local banana plantations. A large musket volley was heard from within the jungle, and enemy forces gradually disappeared from view.

== Later life ==
Herrera later married Don Pablo Mora, a citizen of Granada. The couple had five children, of whom two were paralyzed. Her husband died after the birth of their fifth child, and the family lived in poverty in barrio Corinto (a poor neighborhood in Granada) until 1781. On November 11, 1781, King Charles III of Spain issued a royal decree granting Herrera a pension for life as a reward for her heroic actions during the Battle for the Río San Juan de Nicaragua; she received some land and a pension of 600 pesos in payment for her merits.

== See also ==
- Women in warfare (1750–1799)
- Timeline of women in early modern warfare
