= Río San Juan Department =

Coordinates: 11°00′N 84°30′W

Río San Juan Departamento de Río San Juan
- Department
- Interactive map of Río San Juan
- Country: Nicaragua
- Established: 1957
- Capital: San Carlos

Area
  - Total: 7,473 km^{2} (2,885 sq mi)

Population (2023 estimate)
  - Total: 140,786
  - Density: 18.84/km^{2} (48.79/sq mi)
- ISO 3166-2: NI-SJ

Río San Juan (Spanish pronunciation: [ˈri.o saŋ ˈxwan]) is an administrative division and department in Nicaragua. It covers an area of 7,473 km^{2} (2,885 sq mi) and has a population of 140,786 as of the 2023 estimate. The capital and seat of the department is San Carlos. It is the southernmost department of Nicaragua and is named after the San Juan River, which flows through its territory.

== History ==
The Spanish conquistadors reached the San Juan River, known in early colonial references as El Desaguadero (the drain), in 1525. The Spanish founded the settlement of San Carlos at the point where the river left Lake Nicaragua, and mounted several expeditions to discover the mouth of the river, which was discovered on the Caribbean Sea in 1539. The river served as a key artery connecting the interior cities with the ports. As its strategic importance attracted repeated attacks by pirates and buccaneers, the Spanish constructed a series of fortifications along the river's banks, of which the largest was the Fortaleza de la Inmaculada Concepción (the Castle of the Immaculate Conception), first built in 1675 at the site now known as El Castillo.

During the Anglo-Spanish War (1585–1604), the British force and attempted to capture EL Castillo. After the head of the garrison was killed, his daughter, Rafaela Herrera, led the forces to repel the British attacks. During the Anglo-Spanish War (1796–1808), the British force led by Horatio Nelson captured the castle after a 18 day-siege. However, the British could not make further inroads. The region formed a major transit center during the California Gold Rush in the mid 19th century. Río San Juan department was officially established in 1957 and was carved from territory formerly belonging to the Chontales and Zelaya Departments.

== Geography ==
Río San Juan is one of the departments of Nicaragua. It is situated in the southeastern part of the country and covers an area of 7,473 km^{2} (2,885 sq mi). It is bound by the departments of Chontales and the South Caribbean Coast Autonomous Region to the north, and Rivas to the west. It shares a land border with Costa Rica to the south, and has a coastline along the Caribbean Sea along the east. Lake Nicaragua is situated to the west of the department. San Carlos, located at the confluence of Lake Nicaragua and the San Juan River, is the capital and administrative centre of the department.

The department also includes the Solentiname Archipelago, a group of 36 islands of various sizes located on Lake Nicaragua off the coast of San Carlos. There are several wetlands, and protected reserves in the department, including the Río San Juan Wildlife Refuge, Los Guatuzos Wildlife Refuge, and San Miguelito Wetlands System. The Indio Maíz Biosphere Reserve is a major tropical rainforest conservation area in Central America.

The department includes six municipalities–El Almendro, El Castillo, Morrito, San Carlos, San Juan de Nicaragua and San Miguelito.

== Demographics ==
As per the 2023 estimate, the department had a population of 140,786 inhabitants, of whom, 71,794 were males and 68,992 were females. About 27.1% of the population was classified as rural and rest (72.9%) as urban.
