= Muy Muy =

- Municipality
- Location in Nicaragua
- Coordinates: 12°46′N 85°38′W
- Country: Nicaragua
- Department: Matagalpa

Area
  - Municipality: 145 sq mi (375 km^{2})

Population (2005)
  - Municipality: 14,721
  - Density: 102/sq mi (39.3/km^{2})
  - Urban: 4,037
- Climate: Aw

Muy Muy is a municipality in the Matagalpa department of Nicaragua.

The municipality of Muy Muy was named by the Matagalpa people, who were the indigenous group native to the area. In their native language "muimui" translates to "the best" (sp. los mejores). Translated to Spanish it's "very very", and in nawat it translates to "otter", which were once found in abundance in the region.

== Climate ==
Climate data for Muy Muy (1971–1990)
Month	Jan	Feb	Mar	Apr	May	Jun	Jul	Aug	Sep	Oct	Nov	Dec	Year
Mean daily maximum °C (°F)	27.3 (81.1)	28.7 (83.7)	30.8 (87.4)	32.0 (89.6)	32.0 (89.6)	29.3 (84.7)	28.1 (82.6)	28.7 (83.7)	29.4 (84.9)	29.1 (84.4)	28.4 (83.1)	27.4 (81.3)	29.3 (84.7)
Daily mean °C (°F)	22.1 (71.8)	22.8 (73.0)	24.1 (75.4)	25.1 (77.2)	25.6 (78.1)	24.2 (75.6)	23.4 (74.1)	23.7 (74.7)	24.0 (75.2)	23.8 (74.8)	23.3 (73.9)	22.3 (72.1)	23.7 (74.7)
Mean daily minimum °C (°F)	19.9 (67.8)	19.1 (66.4)	19.8 (67.6)	20.8 (69.4)	22.0 (71.6)	21.7 (71.1)	21.3 (70.3)	21.2 (70.2)	21.1 (70.0)	20.9 (69.6)	20.5 (68.9)	19.6 (67.3)	20.7 (69.3)
Average precipitation mm (inches)	49 (1.9)	23 (0.9)	15 (0.6)	28 (1.1)	126 (5.0)	142 (5.6)	256 (10.1)	257 (10.1)	—	192 (7.6)	97 (3.8)	62 (2.4)	—
Average precipitation days (≥ 1 mm)	9	5	3	3	10	10	22	20	20	18	12	12	144
Mean monthly sunshine hours	196.6	200.1	242.6	220.8	199.5	134.1	133.5	160.6	164.1	191.7	189.0	185.9	2,218.5
Source: National Oceanic and Atmospheric Administration
