= San Carlos, Nicaragua =

San Carlos
- Municipality
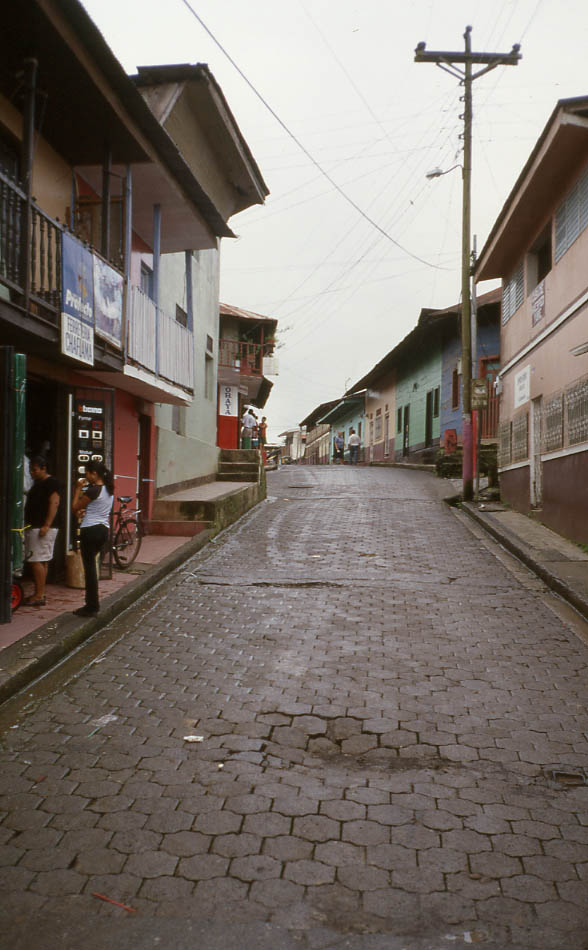
- Street in San Carlos

- Location in Nicaragua
- Coordinates: 11°08′N 84°47′W
- Country: Nicaragua
- Department: Río San Juan Department

Area
  - Total: 558 sq mi (1,445 km^{2})

Population (2023 estimate)
  - Total: 52,191
  - Density: 93.55/sq mi (36.12/km^{2})

San Carlos (Spanish pronunciation: [saŋ ˈkaɾlos]) is a city in southeastern Nicaragua and the capital of Río San Juan Department. It is situated on the southern shore of Lake Nicaragua, at the confluence of the San Juan River. The municipality covers an area of 1,445 km^{2} (558 sq mi) and had an estimated population of 52,191 inhabitants in 2023. It serves as the administrative and commercial centre of the department.

== History ==
The region was earlier inhabited by several Indigenous groups, including the Nicaraos, Pipiles, Caribs, and Miskito peoples. The Spanish conquistadors reached the San Juan River, known in early colonial references as El Desaguadero (the drain), in 1525. Some historians believe the site corresponds to the Spanish settlement of Nueva Jaén, reportedly founded by Captain Gabriel de Rojas in 1527. The settlement was founded at the point where the river left Lake Nicaragua, from which they mounted several expeditions to discover the mouth of the river, which was discovered on the Caribbean Sea in 1539. The river served as a key artery connecting the interior cities with the ports. Official records confirm its existence only in 1679, when Bishop Fray Andrés de las Navas y Quevedo recommended the establishment of a settlement at the mouth of the San Juan River to the Spanish Crown. The indigenous communities were largely displaced, decimated, or enslaved during the colonial period.

As its strategic importance attracted repeated attacks by pirates and buccaneers, the Spanish constructed a series of fortifications along the river's banks including at San Carlos. While the city served as a major center during the colonial era, it lost its importance later. A fire further damaged the city in 1948.

== Geography ==
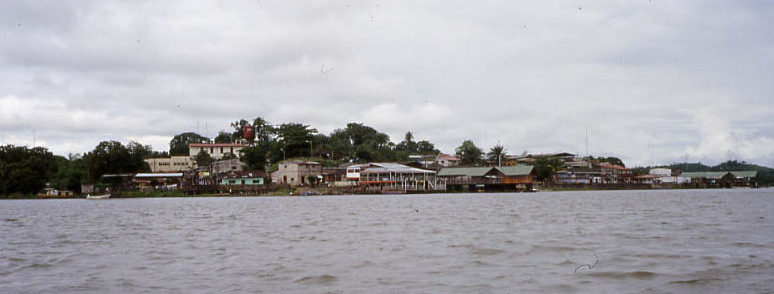
Lake Nicaragua as seen from San Carlos

San Carlos is situated southeastern Nicaragua, near its border with Costa Rica. It is situated on the southern shore of Lake Nicaragua, at the confluence of the San Juan River. The municipality covers an area of 1,445 km^{2} (558 sq mi). It serves as the principal administrative and commercial centre of the department. The municipality includes the Solentiname Islands, an archipelago in the southeastern portion of Lake Nicaragua. It is made up of four large islands–Mancarroncito, Mancarron, La Venada and San Fernanda, and a series of small rocky outcrops, and supports several bird and aquatic species.

== Demographics ==
According to 2023 estimates, the municipality had an estimated population of 52,191 inhabitants, consisting of 26,490 men and 25,701 women. Of the total population, 17,266 lived in urban areas and 34,925 in rural areas.
