= San Pedro de Lóvago =

- Municipality
- Location in Nicaragua
- Coordinates: 12°08′N 85°07′W
- Country: Nicaragua
- Department: Chontales Department

Area
  - Municipality: 180 sq mi (467 km^{2})

Population (2005)
  - Municipality: 7,650
  - Density: 42.4/sq mi (16.4/km^{2})
  - Urban: 3,415

San Pedro de Lóvago (Spanish pronunciation: [sam ˈpeðɾo ðe ˈloβaɣo]) is a city in the Chontales Department of Nicaragua. It is a small town, which mainly consists of farming. It is a region located in the highlands of central Nicaragua.
