= John Dalling =

British Army general

General Sir John Dalling Bt
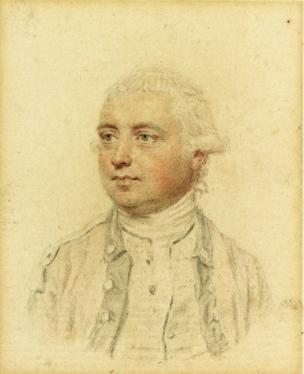
- Sir John Dalling, c. 1780
- Born: c. 1731
- Died: 16 January 1798
- Military career
- Allegiance: Great Britain
- Branch: British Army
- Rank: General
- Commands: Madras Army
- Conflicts: Seven Years' War; American Revolutionary War

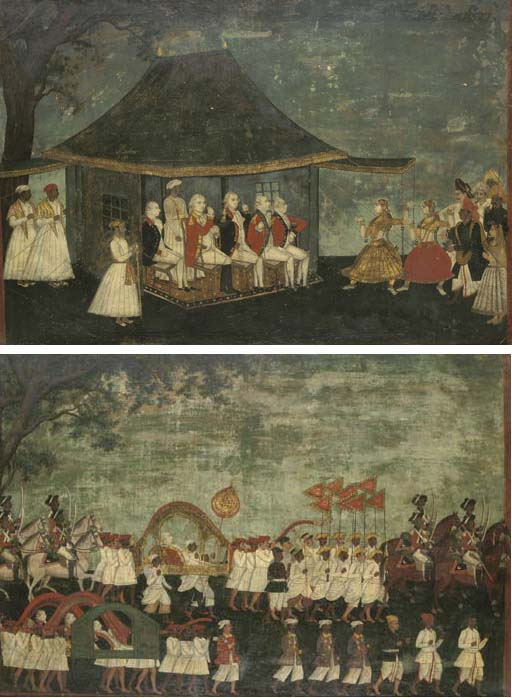
Sir John Dalling and fellow officers in procession; and Sir John Dalling and fellow officers watching a nautch

General Sir John Dalling, 1st Baronet (c. 1731 – 16 January 1798) was a British Army officer and colonial administrator.

== Origins ==
Dalling was the son of John Dalling (1697–1744), of Bungay in Suffolk, by his wife Catherine Windham (d.1738), daughter (and in her issue eventual heiress) of Colonel William Windham (1673–1730), MP, of Earsham in Norfolk (which estate he bought in about 1720 with South Sea Bubble profits). Colonel Windham was the second son of William Windham of Felbrigg Hall in Norfolk, and was a first cousin of Charles Townshend, 2nd Viscount Townshend, both being grandsons of Sir Joseph Ashe, 1st Baronet. In 1810, on the death of Joseph Windham (1739–1810) of Earsham (Colonel Windham's grandson), Dalling's eldest surviving son inherited that estate.

== Career ==
He served under James Wolfe with the British army which fought in the Gulf of St. Lawrence in 1758 and which captured Quebec from the French in the Battle of the Plains of Abraham in 1759. Dalling was Governor of Jamaica from 1777 to 1782 and Commander-in-Chief of the Madras Army (Fort St. George), from 1784 to 1786. He was made Colonel of the 60th Foot in 1776 and having been promoted to lieutenant-general in 1782, he became Colonel of the 37th Foot in 1783. Promoted to full general in 1796, he was created a baronet "of Burwood in the County of Surrey" on 11 March 1783.

== Marriages and issue ==
Dalling married twice:

- Firstly, to Elizabeth Pinnock (1747 – 6 July 1768), a daughter of Philip Pinnock (born 1720), of the Parish of St. Andrew in Jamaica, Speaker of the Jamaican House of Assembly in Kingston, by his wife Grace Dawkins / Dakins (1729–14.8.1771). Philip Pinnock's grandfather was a Quaker from Reading in Berkshire, England, who had emigrated to Barbados before 1658. Elizabeth died on 6 July 1768, having had an only daughter:
  - Elizabeth Windham Dalling (1763–1.5.1768), who died aged 5.

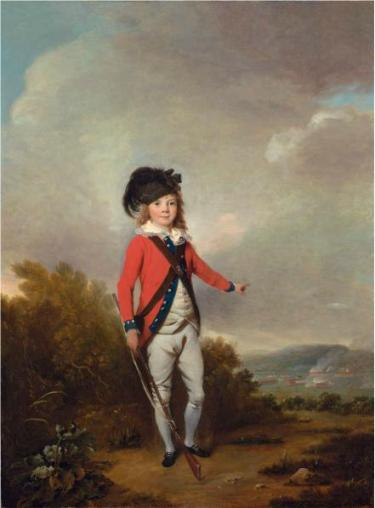
Lieutenant John Windham Dalling (1769–1786), eldest son and heir apparent of the 1st Baronet, who died at Madras, India, aged 17. Portrait by Philip Reinagle (1749–1833)

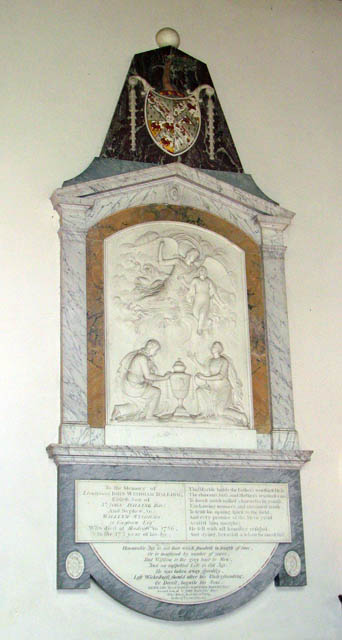
Mural monument in Earsham Church to the first two sons of the 1st Baronet, who both died aged 17

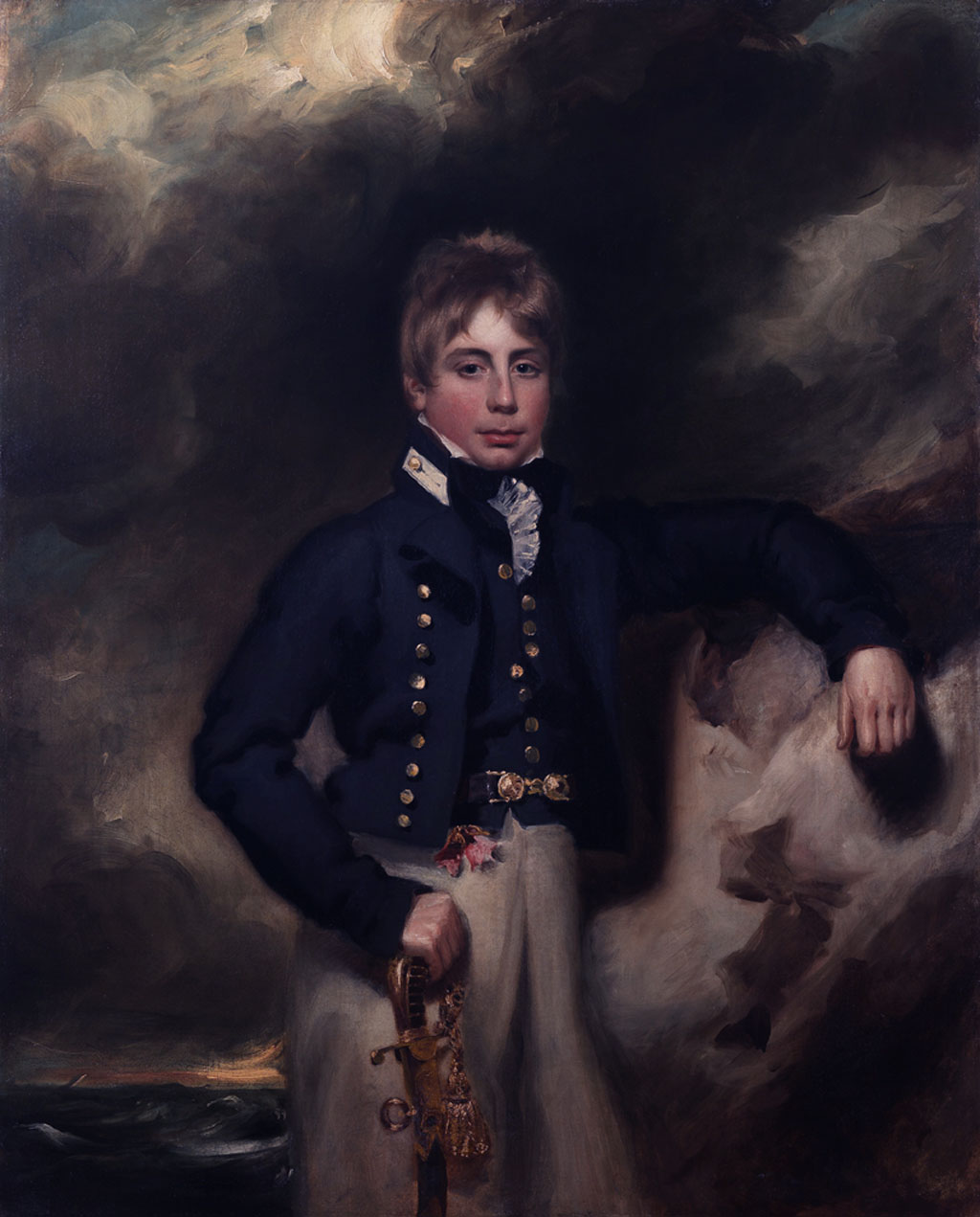
Captain John Windham Dalling (1789–1853), Royal Navy, a younger son of the 1st Baronet. Portrait by George Henry Harlow (1787–1819)

- Secondly, in 1770, he married Louisa Lawford (died 1824), a daughter of Excelles Lawford, of Burwood Park in Surrey, by whom he had issue including:
  - Lieutenant John Windham Dalling (c.1769–1786), eldest son and heir apparent, who died aged 17 at Madras, India, whose mural monument survives in Earsham Church, Norfolk, and whose portrait survives, painted by Philip Reinagle (1749–1833).
  - Charles Lawford Dalling (1772 – 16 April 1789), second son, who died aged 17, also remembered on the mural monument with his elder brother in Earsham Church.
  - Sir William Windham Dalling, 2nd Baronet (1774–1864), of Earsham and 17 Lower Berkeley Street, Westminster, 3rd but eldest surviving son and heir, who served as High Sheriff of Norfolk in 1819. He was awarded compensation as owner of the Donnington Castle sugar estate, in the Parish of St Mary, Jamaica, which in the 1830s had produced an annual income of £5,000 to £6,000. In 1810, on the death of Joseph Windham (1739–1810) of Earsham (Colonel Windham's grandson), he inherited the Earsham estate.
  - Captain John Windham Dalling (1789–1853), Royal Navy.
  - Anne Louise Dalling (1785–1853), who in 1808 married General the Hon. Robert Meade, of Burrenwood and Rathfriland, younger son of John Meade, 1st Earl of Clanwilliam and his wife Theodosia Magill.

== Dalling's Vizagaptam Cabinets ==
The Dalling Cabinets, sold at Christie's in London in 2005 for £78,000 a pair of Anglo-Indian Vizagapatam ivory bureau cabinets, made circa 1786, on ebonised and parcel gilt stands, c1810, were made for Dalling near Madras and brought home to Britain. Each is inlaid overall with panels depicting buildings, trees and flowers, surrounded by borders of scrolling foliage, with triangular open pediment above a frieze drawer and three pigeon-holes and three drawers flanked by doors enclosing two pigeon-holes and three drawers, above a hinged flap enclosing a fitted interior of pigeon-holes and drawers divided by column-drawers, above a long drawer fitted with divisions, on bracket feet, the interior and carcase in satinwood, on a rounded rectangular stand with solid three-quarter gallery above a reeded frieze, on spirally-fluted tapering legs and ring-turned tapering feet, minor variations in size and decoration, the pediment now positioned at the rear edge. These engraved bureau-cabinets, serving as portable desk jewel-case and dressing-box, are designed as a miniature 'desk and bookcase' with Roman-temple pediment. Engraved tablets, wreathed by floral 'chintz' fashioned borders, portray magnificent villa landscapes. This artistic India-flowered furniture, crafted in ivory veneer, was retailed in Madras and Calcutta by the English and Dutch East India Companies; but it was primarily manufactured in Vizagapatam, on the northern Coromandel Coast. Two other related cabinets, from the estate of Alexander Wynch, a former East India Company Governor of Fort St. George, were acquired in the 1770s by George III. They measure: (overall) 57¼ inches high; 26½ inches wide; and 13½ inches deep. The cabinets are 36¾ inches high; 25 inches wide; and 11¾ inches deep. The English stands are 20½ inches high.

Military offices
Preceded by William Taylor	Colonel-Commandant of the 3rd Battalion, 60th Regiment of Foot; 1776–1783	Vacant Title next held by William Rowley
Preceded by Sir Eyre Coote	Colonel of the 37th (North Hampshire) Regiment of Foot; 1783–1798	Succeeded by Hew Dalrymple
Government offices
Preceded by Sir William Trelawney	Governor of Jamaica, acting 1772–1774	Succeeded by Sir Basil Keith
Preceded by Sir Basil Keith	Governor of Jamaica; 1777–1781	Succeeded by Archibald Campbell
Baronetage of Great Britain
New creation	Baronet (of Burwood); 1783–1790	Succeeded by William Windham Dalling
