= San Juan River (Nicaragua) =

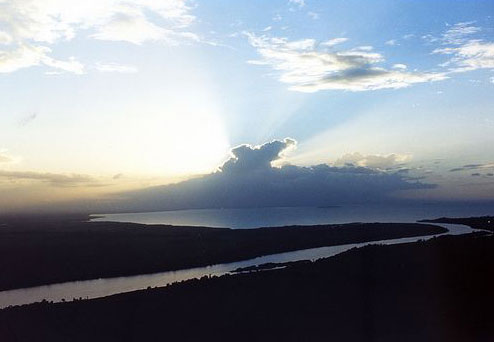
- San Juan River
- Native name: Río San Juan (Spanish)

Location
- Countries: Nicaragua; Costa Rica

Physical characteristics
- Source
  - location: Lake Nicaragua
- Mouth
  - location: Caribbean Sea
  - coordinates: 10°56′23″N 83°41′54″W
- Length: 110 mi (180 km)

The San Juan River (Spanish: Río San Juan), also known as El Desaguadero ("the drain"), is a 192-kilometre (119 mi) river that flows east out of Lake Nicaragua into the Caribbean Sea. A large section of the border between Nicaragua and Costa Rica runs on the southern bank of the river. It was part, with the lake, of a proposed route for a Nicaragua Canal in the 19th century. The idea of the project has been revived in the last decade, including the possibility of other routes within the country. The Ecocanal project has obtained a Concession from the National Assembly of Nicaragua to re-open the San Juan River to commercial barge traffic.

The Cañas–Jerez Treaty states that Nicaragua owns the waters of the river and that Costa Rica can only use it for commercial navigation on certain parts of the river at Nicaragua's discretion.

The San Juan River is home to freshwater bull sharks that also go into Lake Nicaragua in addition to a wide array of marine life and biodiversity.

== History ==
Before the Panama Canal, the San Juan River was frequently used as a major part of the route from the Atlantic to the Pacific Ocean. Many people, including African slaves, were transported via this route. During the California Gold Rush, many people from all over the world traveled to California to mine for gold. Tens of thousands took a steamboat that was operated by the Accessory Transit Company and was directed by Cornelius Vanderbilt. The boat travelled up the San Juan River and across Lake Nicaragua; a stagecoach completed the connection to the Pacific coast.

== Rapids ==
As one travels upstream from the Caribbean Sea to Lake Nicaragua, one encounters the following sets of rapids:

- Raudal de Machuca
- Raudal del Mico
- Raudal Los Valos
- Raudal del Castillo (Raudal del Diablo)
- Raudal del Toro

== See also ==
- Boundary dispute along the San Juan River
- El Castillo
- Boca de Sábalos
- Piracy on Lake Nicaragua
