= History of Central America =

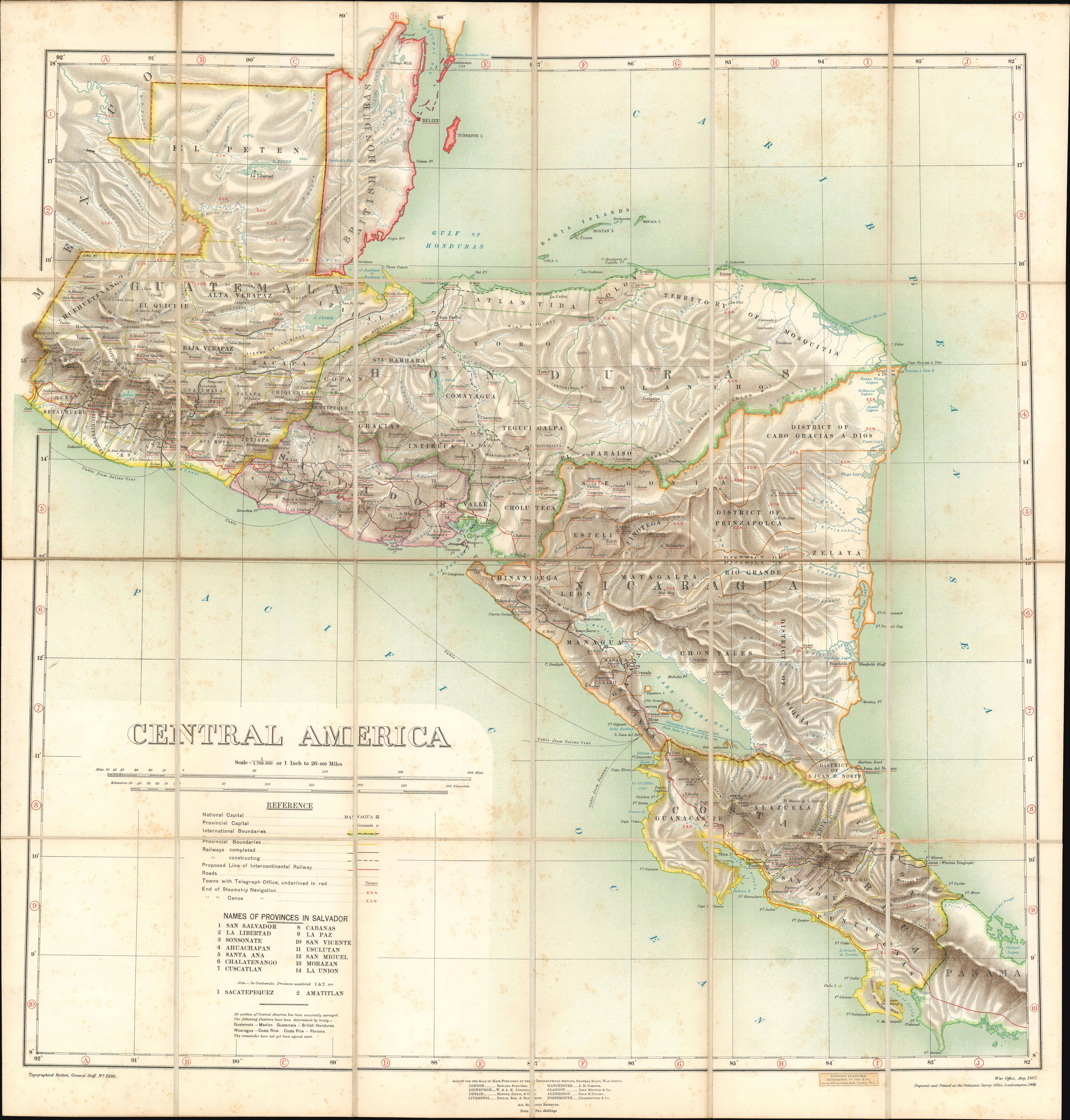
Historical map of Central America

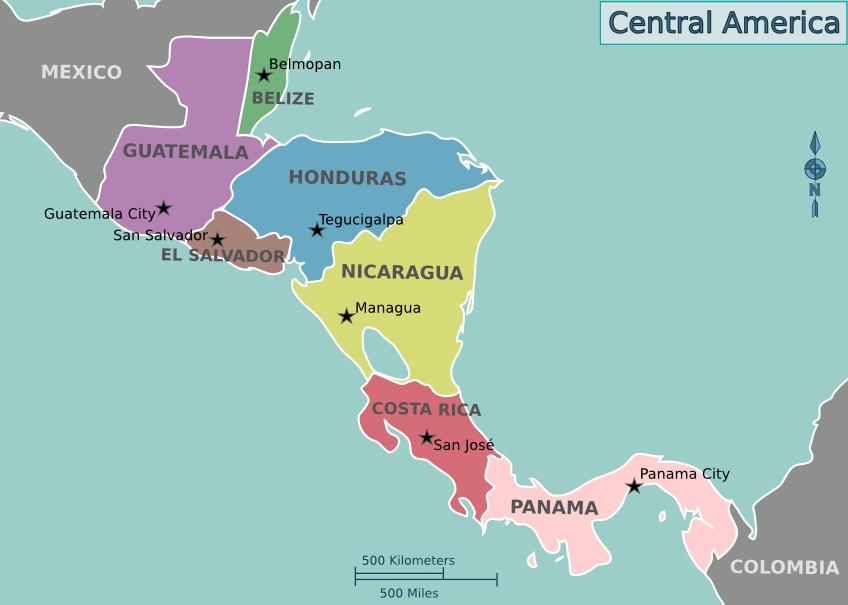
20th century political map of Central America

Political evolution of Central America and the Caribbean from 1700 to present

Central America is commonly said to include Guatemala, Belize, El Salvador, Honduras, Nicaragua, Costa Rica, and Panama. This definition matches modern political borders. Central America begins geographically in Mexico, at the Isthmus of Tehuantepec, Mexico's narrowest point, and the former country of Yucatán (1841–1848) was part of Central America. At the other end, before its independence in 1903 Panama was part of South America, as it was a Department of Colombia. At times Belize, a British colony until 1981, where English instead of Spanish is spoken, and where the population is primarily of African origin, has been considered not part of (Spanish-speaking) Central America.

Long and narrow, Central America does not have an obvious geographical center. Until the middle of the 20th century there were no roads between the countries, which isolated them from each other, and railroads have never connected them. During colonial times Guatemala was the administrative and religious center; religiously it remains so. However, attempts to create a Central American Political Union, like the European Union, have failed. The countries that joined the EU already had extensive cross-border traffic by train; even today (2021) there is by comparison very little, and none by train.

The countries, furthermore, are more diverse than they appear at first glance. Some (Guatemala) have a large indigenous or Native American population, others (Costa Rica) do not. Some (El Salvador) are focused on their Pacific coast, while in others (Belize, Honduras) the Caribbean or Atlantic coast is more important. Panama and to a lesser extent Guatemala and Costa Rica have both coasts playing a significant role. Some countries have stable governments (Costa Rica), others do not (Nicaragua, El Salvador). Panama is heavily Americanized, uses the US dollar as its currency, has a large industry and source of revenue (the canal) which comes from the ships and people passing through the country and previously the U.S. military installations in the former Canal Zone.

== Before European contact ==
In the pre-Columbian era, the northern areas of Central America were inhabited by the indigenous peoples of Mesoamerica. Most notable among these were the Maya peoples, who had built numerous cities throughout the region, and the Aztecs, who had created a vast empire. The pre-Columbian cultures of eastern Honduras, Caribbean Nicaragua, most of Costa Rica and Panama were predominantly speakers of the Chibchan languages at the time of European contact and are considered by some culturally different and grouped in the Isthmo-Colombian Area.

== Spanish colonial era ==
Central America is composed of seven independent nations: Belize, Costa Rica, El Salvador, Guatemala, Honduras, Nicaragua, and Panama. After the Spanish conquest in the 16th century, most of the inhabitants of Central America shared a similar history. The exception was the Western Caribbean Zone, which included the Caribbean coast and encompassed both semi-independent indigenous polities, runaway slave communities, and settlers, especially British settlers who would eventually form British Honduras (the modern-day nation of Belize), a sparsely populated area that was inhabited by the British through the Treaty of Madrid from Spain. When Spain failed to regain control over British Honduras, the British continued to inhabit the country and eventually colonized it. When Guatemala gained its independence, it assumed inheritance of British Honduras from Spain. British Honduras had been a British settlement, not a colony (the treaty between Spain and the United Kingdom prohibited British colonies in the territory) for several years. After many years of controversy, a treaty was signed between Guatemala and the United Kingdom in which the Guatemalan President of the time recognized the original territory (granted by the kingdom of Spain to the British Crown) of Belize. Within this treaty, was also an agreement for a cart road to be built from Guatemala City through British Honduras to the Caribbean Sea. Since the cart road was never built, Guatemala declared the treaty null and void. British Honduras, as the British called it, and Belize as the Spaniards and Guatemalans said, gained its independence from Great Britain in 1981 and adopted the name "Belize". Guatemala still disputes the Belizean territory.

From the 16th century through 1821, Central America formed the Captaincy General of Guatemala, sometimes known also as the Kingdom of Guatemala, composed by a part of the state of Chiapas (nowadays part of Mexico), Guatemala, El Salvador, Honduras, Nicaragua, and Costa Rica. Officially, the Captaincy was part of the Vice royalty of New Spain and therefore under the supervision of the Spanish viceroy in Mexico City. It was, however, administered not by the viceroy or his deputies, but by an independently appointed Captain General headquartered first in Antigua and later in Guatemala City.

== Independence ==
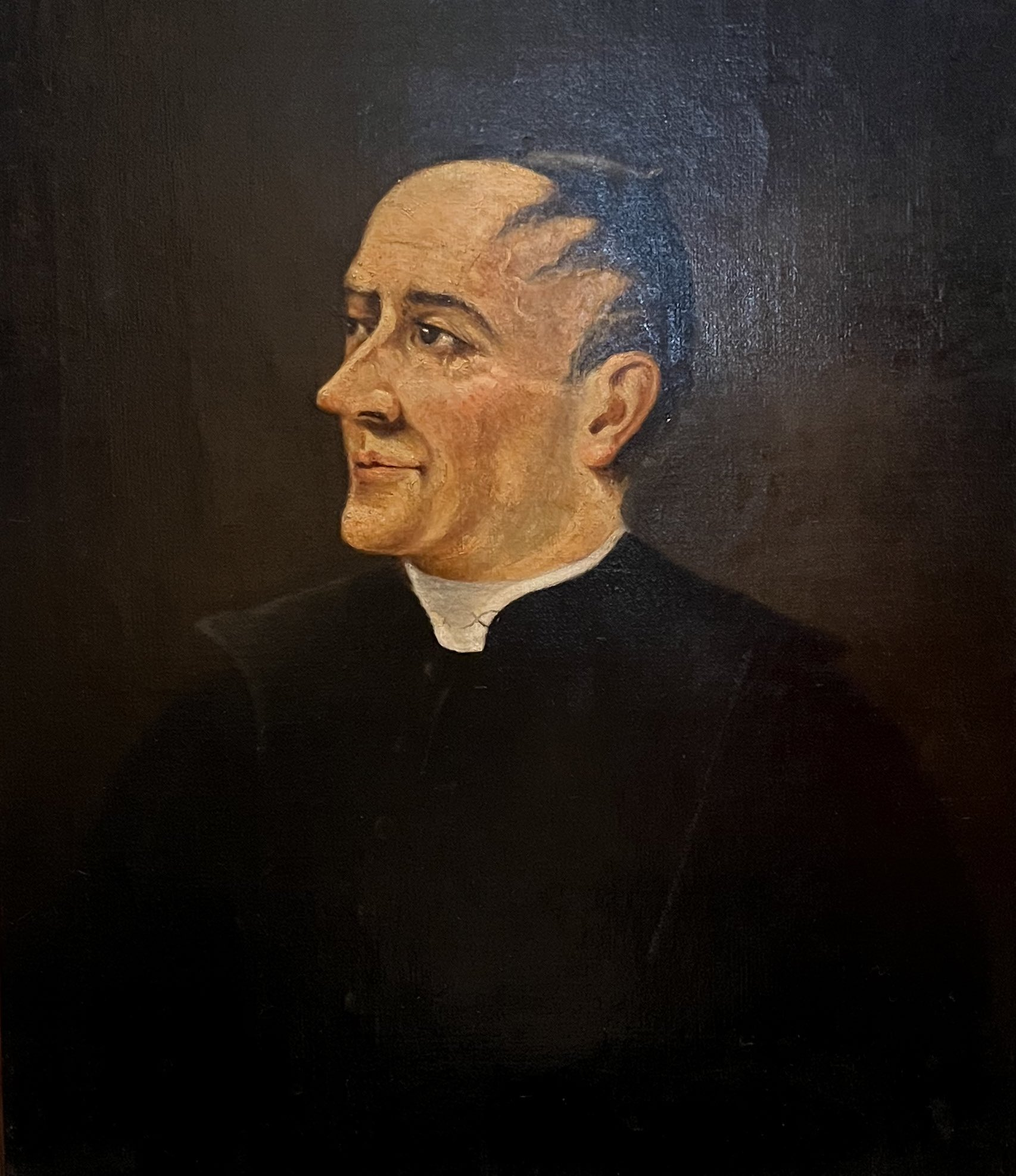
José Matías Delgado y de León listed as the intellectual leader of the independence movement; Delgado was defined as influential, skillful, and intelligent, he started the revolutionary movements against the Spanish crown.

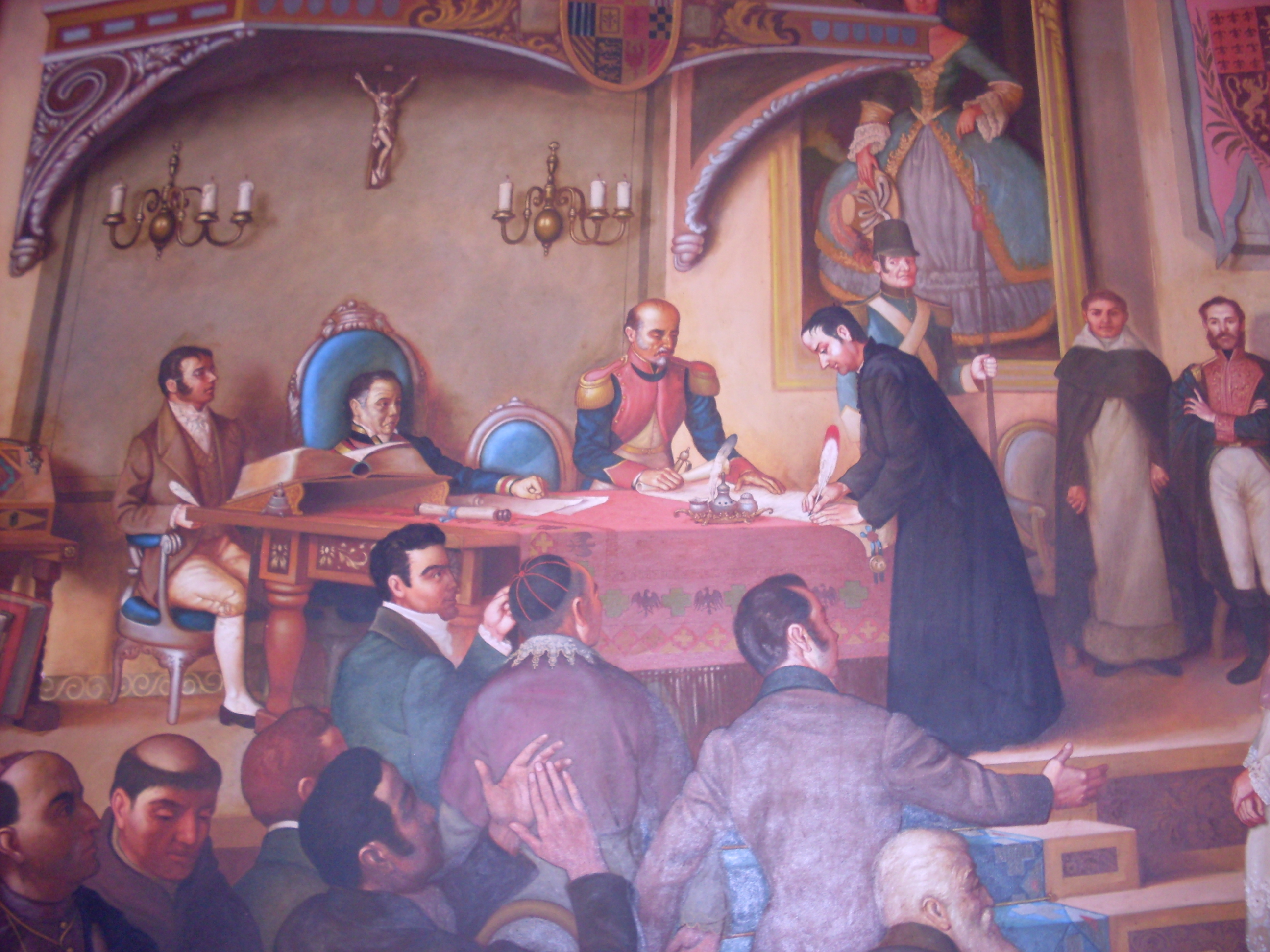
José Matías Delgado at the time of signing the Central American act of independence, in a representation of the meeting of September 15, 1821 of the Chilean painter Luis Vergara Ahumada.

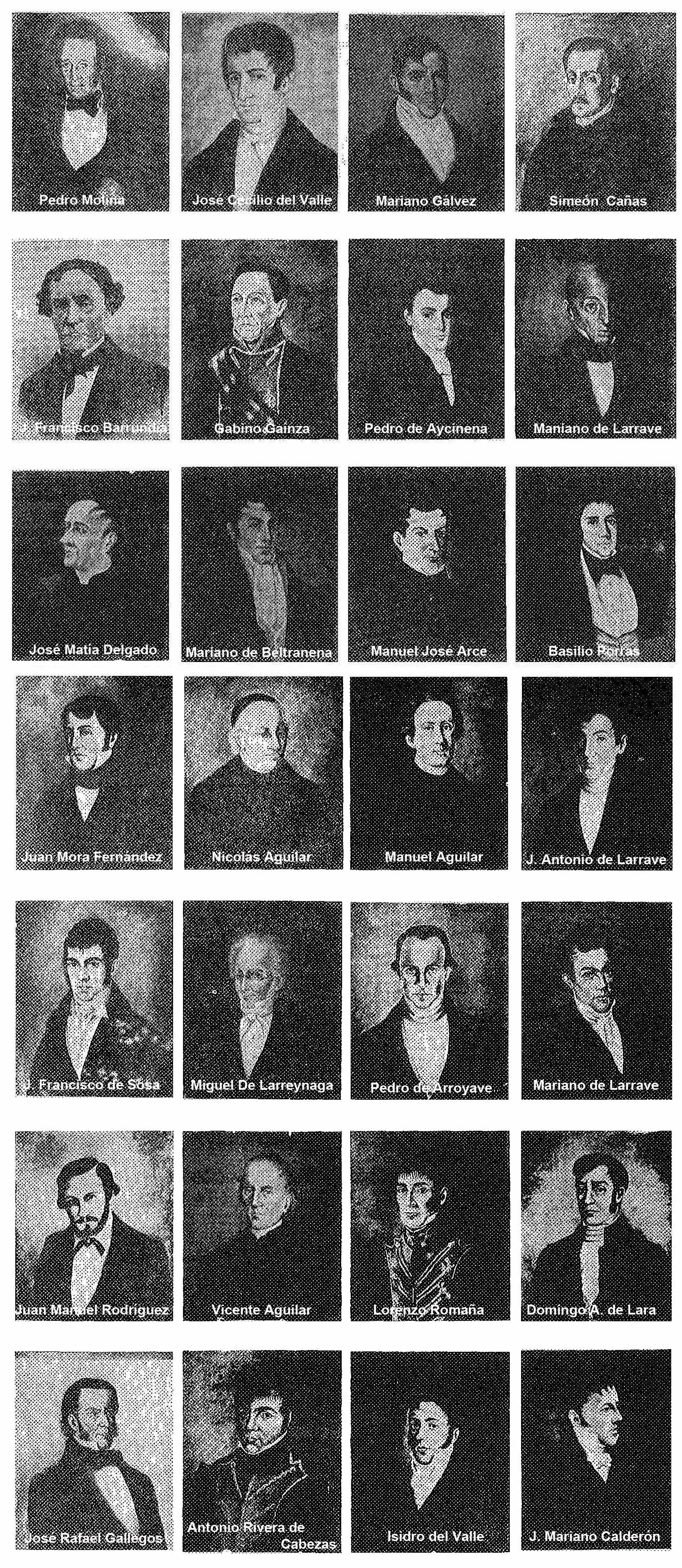
Heroes of Central American Independence

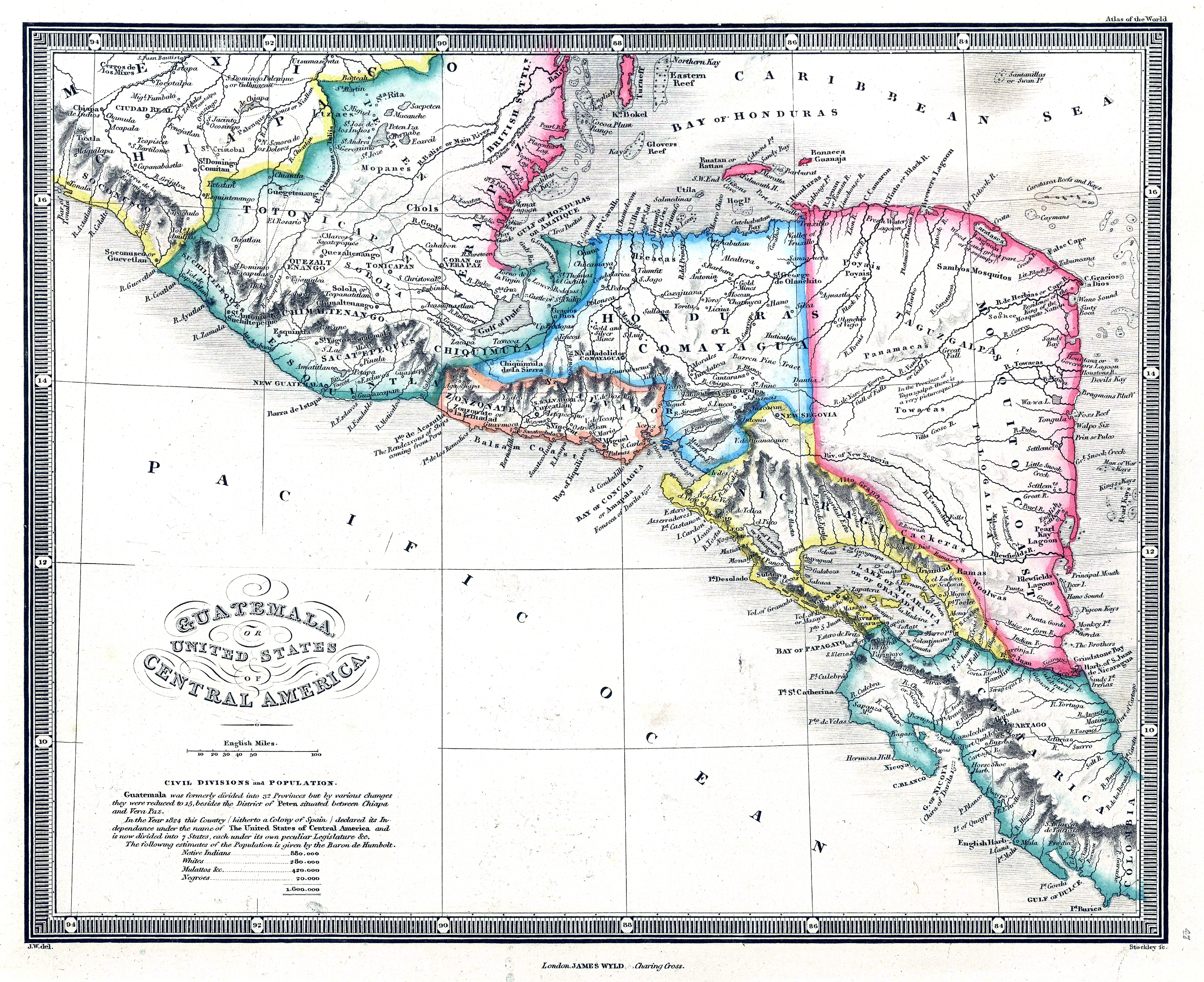
Central America until 1860, showing the Kingdom of Mosquitia.

In 1811, independence movements broke out in El Salvador in reaction to events in the Peninsular War, and again in 1814 after the restoration of Ferdinand VII. Both revolts were easily suppressed and the political unrest was subsumed into the general political process in the Spanish world that led to the Spanish Constitution of 1812. Between 1810 and 1814, the Captaincy General elected seven representatives to the Cortes of Cádiz, in addition to forming a locally elected Provincial Deputation. In 1821 a congress of Central American Criollos in Guatemala City composed the Act of Independence of Central America to declare the region's independence from Spain, effective on 15 September of that year. That date is still marked as independence day by most Central American nations. The Spanish Captain General, Gabino Gaínza, sympathized with the rebels and it was decided that he should stay on as interim leader until a new government could be formed. Independence was short-lived, for the conservative leaders in Guatemala welcomed annexation by the First Mexican Empire of Agustín de Iturbide on 5 January 1822. Central American liberals objected to this, but an army from Mexico under General Vicente Filísola occupied Guatemala City and quelled dissent.

When Mexico became a republic the following year, it acknowledged Central America's right to determine its own destiny. On 1 July 1823, the congress of Central America declared the Absolute Declaration. The primary provision of this declaration was the absolute independence of Central America from Spain, Mexico, and any other foreign nation, including any in North America. With regards to Spain, the declaration stated that Spain had usurped the rights of the colonies in Central America for three centuries, and reiterated the earlier independence acts of 1821. On the issue of Mexico and annexation into a greater Spanish American state in North America, the declaration labeled Mexican involvement in Central American independence as forceful and unlawful. This served to de-legitimize Mexican actions during the previous two years and separate Central America as a political entity. Further, a Republican system of government was established under a unitary system. Though Guatemala would attempt to unify the provinces of Central America with its adoption of federalism, regional divisions endured. The conflicts between powerful urban centers in each region, including Guatemala itself, would make it difficult to unify provinces internally, and it was all the harder to do so as a wider region. The conflict between republicans and monarchists also made political unity difficult in Central America. These qualities would exist for decades after the region's separation from Spain and Mexico and would help to create the modern boundaries of Central America.

=== Federal Republic of Central America ===
Flag of Central America

In 1823, the Federal Republic of Central America was formed. It was intended to be a federal republic modeled after the United States of America. It was provisionally known as "The United Provinces of Central America," while the final name according to the Constitution of 1824 was "The Federal Republic of Central America." It is sometimes incorrectly referred to in English as "The United States of Central America." The Central American nation consisted of the states of Guatemala, El Salvador, Honduras, Nicaragua, and Costa Rica. In the 1830s, an additional state was added, Los Altos, with its capital in Quetzaltenango, occupying parts of what is now the western highlands of Guatemala as well as part of Chiapas (now part of Mexico), but this state was reincorporated into Guatemala and Mexico respectively in 1840.

Central American liberals had high hopes for the federal republic, which they believed would evolve into a modern, democratic nation, enriched by trade crossing through it between the Atlantic and the Pacific oceans. These aspirations are reflected in the emblems of the federal republic: The flag shows a white band between two blue stripes, representing the land between two oceans. The coat of arms shows five mountains (one for each state) between two oceans, surmounted by a Phrygian cap, the emblem of the French Revolution.

The Union dissolved in civil war between 1838 and 1840. Its disintegration began when Nicaragua separated from the federation on November 5, 1838. The United Provinces of Central America (or PUCA- Provincias Unidas De Centro-America in Spanish) is the name given to the different states of Central America in the time after Central America's independence and before becoming their own distinct nations (between 1823 and 1840). It was a political movement that strived to unify the regions of El Salvador, Nicaragua, Costa Rica, and Guatemala (Panama and Belize at the time were under separate ownership) under a liberal federal government and believed that united they would be a stronger political unit. Unfortunately, due to many strong political disagreements within the different states, the UPCA eventually disbanded and the regions became separate nations with devastating political and economic civil wars that are still felt today.

The kingdom of Guatemala, as Central America was more commonly known as during Spanish and Mexican rule, had been annexed into Mexico in 1822 under the rule of emperor Agustín de Iturbide. The annexation was not without controversy, however, and tensions simmered between the republicans and nationalists favoring complete independence on one side and monarchists, who often favored annexation into Mexico, on the other. These tensions took varying forms depending on the region in question. In El Salvador, the provincial council openly defied annexation into Mexico. Meanwhile, in other regions, inner tensions between cities such as Leon Granada in Nicaragua made any sense of unity fleeting at best. Shortly after the annexation, opposition against the monarch from Central American nationalists and republicans continued to grow. These groups pushed for independence from Mexico. Iturbide's unsuccessful leadership of Central America and the seeming collapse of the Mexican Empire caused his party to fail against the uprising rebels and on July 1, 1823, Central America gained its independence.

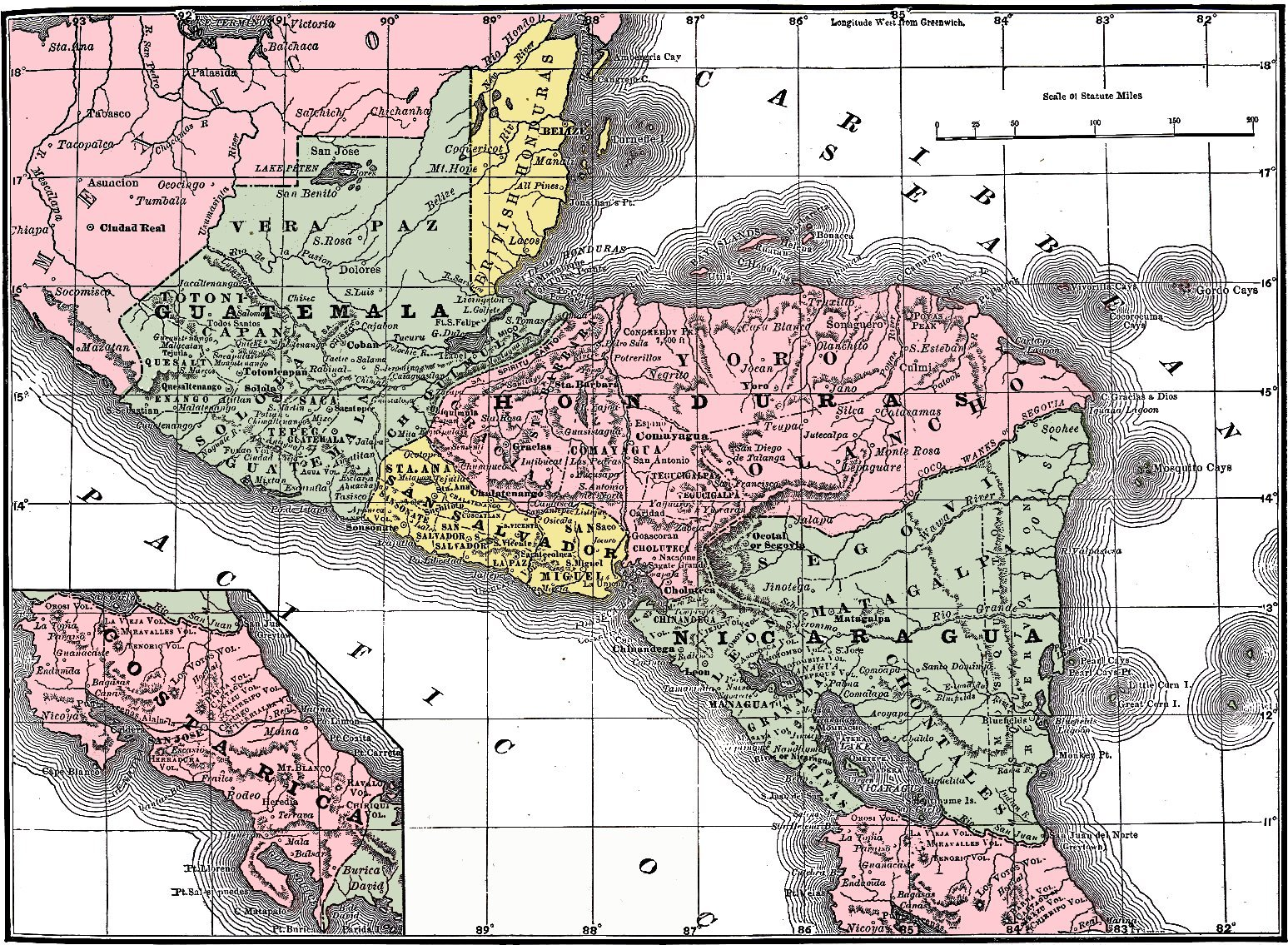
Central America in 1892

After independence, officials from the different regions gathered in a junta to decide the future of El Salvador, Nicaragua, Costa Rica, Honduras, and Guatemala. They decided to unite into a federation of five autonomous states, thus creating the UPCA, a term coined by Brigadier General Vicente Filisola, who was stationed in Guatemala City.

The UPCA's aims were to be a liberal government with political principles modeled after the United States, and also to remain united. They felt that the "provinces alone were too small and weak economically to survive as sovereign states" so they "avert[ed] fragmentation of the isthmus" and pushed for union. However, the UPCA soon noticed that there were many political ideals between the regions and conservative parties on the other end of the political spectrum actively showed their discontent under the new liberal regime. Despite this, the beginning of the federation went relatively smoothly and negotiations helped them reform borders, capital cities were moved to accommodate the citizens, and economies of coffee grew high. All the while, tensions between the liberals and conservatives and power struggles within the different economies increasingly grew.

One of the most notable key figures of UPCA was Francisco Morazán, a liberal advocate who was chosen president of the UPCA. In the 1820s and through the 1830s Morazán took an active role in liberal movements throughout Central America, especially in Guatemala, Nicaragua, and Honduras against conservative parties. These battles between parties increasingly divided the nation causing sour relationships and distance between them. Differences between liberals who wanted free trade, favored a republic and had anti-clerical views contested those of the conservatives who wanted a monarchy, trade under close control and power to the church. These conflicts, along with cholera outbreaks, foreign intervention, and distress among those in poverty caused many insurgencies, resulting in various civil wars throughout Central America.

Morazán was captured in Costa Rica by the conservative party and they assassinated him on September 15, 1842, which marked the official end of the UPCA. Upon notification of his death, greater turmoil and fights among the opposing liberal and conservative parties increased. It is said that the conservative-liberal struggles that Morazán campaigned for are still in effect today. In addition, lacking a central authority proved to be unproductive and created more disputes and distrust within the different nations. In fact, foreigners who were looking to make economic and/or political negotiations were told that they had to go to each individual region for consultations and found it inconvenient. The desire for power and their inability to overcome bad relations among each other led to the fall of the UPCA. Nicaragua, Honduras, and Costa Rica seceded from the union in 1838. In 1839 Guatemala seceded, and in 1840 El Salvador did the same.

The provinces shortly after became their own separate republican nations, of which we are more familiar with today and eventually Panama and Belize came to be seen as part of what we know today as "Central America." Tensions among the different nations, however, continued to grow more aggressive throughout the rest of the 19th century. Despite knowing that unification would overall work better for Central America, they remained separate. Though many attempts to reunite the nations have been attempted throughout the years, none has succeeded. Civil wars continued to be part of Central America through the 20th into the 21st century.

=== Greater Republic of Central America ===
Various attempts were made to reunite Central America in the 19th century, but none succeeded for any length of time. The first attempt was in 1842 by former President Francisco Morazán, who was quickly captured and executed. The abortive attempt proposed to restore the union as the Confederation of Central America (1842–1844) and planned to include El Salvador, Guatemala, Honduras, and Nicaragua. This first attempt lasted until 1844.

A second attempt was made and lasted from October to November 1852, when El Salvador, Honduras, and Nicaragua created a Federation of Central America (Federacion de Centro America). Guatemalan President Justo Rufino Barrios attempted to reunite the nation by force of arms in the 1880s and was killed in the process, like his 1842 predecessor.

The third union of Honduras, Nicaragua, and El Salvador as the Greater Republic of Central America or "Republica Mayor de Centroamerica" lasted from 1896 to 1898. The last attempt occurred between June 1921 and January 1922 when El Salvador, Guatemala, Honduras and Costa Rica formed a (second) Federation of Central America. The treaty establishing this federation was signed at San José, Costa Rica on January 19, 1921. This second Federation was nearly moribund from the start, having only a provisional Federal Council made up of delegates from each state.

Despite the failure of a lasting political union, the concept of Central American reunification, though lacking enthusiasm from the leaders of the individual countries, arose from time to time. In 1856–1857, the region successfully established a military coalition to repel an invasion by American adventurer William Walker. Today, all five nations fly flags that retain the old federal motif of two outer blue bands bounding an inner white stripe. Costa Rica, traditionally the least committed of the five to regional integration, modified its flag significantly in 1848 by darkening the blue and adding a double-wide inner red band, in honor of the French tricolor.

=== Territorial transfers by the British Empire ===
In 1850, the British Empire signed the Clayton–Bulwer Treaty with the United States, whereby the two powers undertook to guarantee neutrality, equal use of the proposed future navigable canal, and not to "occupy, or fortify, or colonize, or assume or exercise any dominion over Nicaragua, Costa Rica, the Mosquito Coast or any part of Central America", nor make use of any protectorate or alliance, present or future, to such ends.

As a result of this treaty, following a long crisis between the British and the Americans, the British Empire finally signed the Treaty of Comayagua with Honduras in 1859, whereby the British government ceded the Bay Islands and the northern part of the Mosquito Coast to Honduras. The following year, in 1860, the British Empire also signed the Treaty of Managua with Nicaragua, whereby the British government handed over the rest of the Mosquitia protectorate to Nicaragua. However, the Mosquito Reserve continued to exist as a quasi-independent state, a situation that lasted until the Nicaragua Crisis of 1894–1895, when the Nicaraguan government definitively incorporated it and turned it into the Zelaya Department. Attempts to decide the border between Honduras and Nicaragua over the annexed territory of Costa Mosquitos began in 1869 but would not be resolved until ninety-one years later, when the International Court of Justice ruled in favor of Honduras in 1960.

The British Empire continued to maintain the colony of British Honduras until 1981, when it gained independence as Belize.

== The liberal reforms period ==
Even though the dates for this period change from country to country, they approximately correspond to the years between 1870 and 1930. During this time, political elites in the five Central American countries advanced reforms on agriculture, commerce, and redefined the relationship between the state, society and the economy. The most relevant political figures during this period were the presidents Justo Rufino Barrios in Guatemala, Rafael Zaldivar in El Salvador, Braulio Carrillo Colina and Tomas Guardia in Costa Rica, Marco Aurelio Soto in Honduras, and José Santos Zelaya in Nicaragua. The key result of this period in all the Central American countries was a transition from communal to private ownership of land. The extent to which liberals targeted common lands for privatization varied from country to country. Likewise, there were important differences in the size of the commercial landholding estate. Another variation among the policies promoted by the liberal governments was the use of coercion and security organizations in to implement reforms to the land ownership policies.

== 20th century ==
In 1907, a Central American Court of Justice was created. On December 13, 1960, Guatemala, El Salvador, Honduras, and Nicaragua established the Central American Common Market (CACM). Costa Rica chose not to participate in the CACM. The goals for the CACM were to create greater political unification and success of import substitution industrialization policies. The project was an immediate economic success but was abandoned after the 1969 "Football War" between El Salvador and Honduras.

By the 1930s the United Fruit Company owned 3.5 million acres of land in Central America and the Caribbean and was the single largest land owner in Guatemala. Such holdings gave it great power over the governments of small countries. That was one of the factors that led to the coining of the phrase Banana republic.

On November 22, 1971, the United States handed over the Swan Islands to Honduras after signing the Treaty of the Swan Islands. Honduras began exercising this sovereignty on September 1, 1972.

In 1977, the United States and Panama signed the Torrijos–Carter Treaties, whereby the US handed over the Panama Canal Zone in 1979 and returned the Panama Canal to Panama in 1999.

A Central American Parliament has operated, as a purely advisory body, since 1991. The regional parliament seat deputies from the four former members of the Union (Nicaragua, Guatemala, El Salvador, and Honduras), as well as from Panama and the Dominican Republic.

Another initiative is known as Free Movement of people in the CA-4, which has opened the borders between Nicaragua and Guatemala removing the need to carry a passport to cross borders, just a national ID (cédula de identidad) is enough to cross borders. This initiative is the result of negotiations of the Central American Commission of Directors of Migration (OCAM) with the support of the International Organization for Migration (IOM). This initiative has been in effect since 2007.

== History of Central American nations ==
- History of Belize
- History of Costa Rica
- History of El Salvador
- History of Guatemala
- History of Honduras
- History of Nicaragua
- History of Panama
