= Marshall Bennett (merchant) =

English merchant in Central America (d. 1839)

- Born: c. before 1775
- Died: October 3, 1839 (aged 63–64); Belize
- Occupations: Merchant and plantation owner
- Known for: Promoter of settlements on the east coast of Central America
- Spouse: Elizabeth Cooke (m. 1803)

Marshall Bennett (born before 1775 – 1839) was a British merchant and plantation owner with interests in sugar and mahogany, entrepreneur and company promoter, active on the east coast of Central America. He was a business associate of Francisco Morazán at the time of the Federal Republic of Central America, based in Honduras, Guatemala and Belize City.

== Life ==
Bennett has been described as the head of the wood-cutting oligarchy in Belize City. The Belize entrepôt became de facto the colony British Honduras with the treaty that ended the Anglo-Spanish War (1779–1783), and gained further territory from Spain as a result of the Convention of London (1786); that convention also led to the British Black River settlement to the east being closed down.

Belize was important in the commerce of the whole Bay of Honduras. In 1802 Bennett acted as convener for a succession debate in the Kingdom of Mosquitia after the 1801 death of George II Frederic. At Cabo Gracias a Dios, George Frederic Augustus II was declared heir apparent.

The predominance established by Bennett was challenged in 1807 by the colonial administrator Alexander Mark Kerr Hamilton, but the attempt foundered in the face of Bennett's local support. A magistrate from 1813 to 1829, Bennett became chief magistrate of Belize, and the leading merchant. The progress of the Spanish American wars of independence led to practical autonomy for Belize by the early 1820s. Bennett and the merchant John Waldron Wright, as oligarchical leaders, imposed protectionist duties on wood that was not "local" brought to Belize in 1818.

Bennett was considered to have contributed to the failure of the Sico River settlement "Poyais" of Gregor MacGregor. The scheme echoed the earlier Black River settlement. It was based on a land grant to MacGregor by the Miskito king George Frederic, but the settlers found none of the infrastructure they had expected. In April 1823, Edward Codd, incoming Superintendent of British Honduras, sent Bennett in his capacity as chief magistrate, with his clerk, on the Mexican Eagle to investigate conditions at the settlement. With the agreement of its governor Hector Hall, some settlers who were unwell were taken back to Belize. More settlers arrived, and then eventually, by June 1823, the whole settlement was evacuated. The Miskito king revoked the land grant, and it is possible that he owed the argument that it violated the terms of the 1786 Convention to Bennett.

=== 1830s ===
Bennett's plantation in Honduras employed over 230 enslaved people, for which he was compensated in an 1835 claim, under the terms of Slavery Abolition Act 1833 applying to the British Empire.

Expanding his field of operations, Bennett during the 1830s obtained two major concessions in Guatemala, a land grant in Verapaz, and then in 1835 a mahogany monopoly in Mosquitia. The major sugar estate at San Jerónimo came to Bennett, purchased by a consortium including local interests, and the mahogany rights to his London vehicle the Eastern Coast of Central America Commercial and Agricultural Company.

The Verapaz grant was on the north side of Lake Izabal (the Golfo Dulce), and the deal involved Thomas Gould, whom Bennett had diverted from his original purpose of making something of the former Poyais grant. On the south side, Bennett received, in the same year 1834, a grant in Chiquimula on the Motagua River. His main interest there was mahogany logging, while the ostensible reason for the grant was colonisation, and by 1836 Bennett was in trouble with the Guatemala government of Mariano Gálvez for lack of compliance. The grants were on very favourable terms, the land being wholly owned after 20 years. Bennett also obtained another grant covering the ports of Mátías de Gálvez and Puerto Barrios. In negotiations, he had backing from the British consul Frederick Chatfield; while Bennett was pursuing a project for a new commercial base across the Bay from Belize, Chatfield foresaw annexation to Belize.

The Mosquitian mahogany concession was held by Bennett with the politician Francisco Morázan, at this period president of the Federal Republic of Central America. It ran along the northern coast from the western border of Guatemala to the Patuca River (Patook River). With it, Bennett and his partner had close to a monopoly position. While Bennett made efforts to perfect the hold on mahogany cutting in the region, opposition rose, in the form of protectionism at Belize, which the Board of Trade ruled out, and illicit logging. Others particularly began to cut trees in prime stands east of Trujillo, in the area of the Aguán River (Román River) and Limón. Bennett decided to back off from enforcement of the monopoly there, partly because the current Mosquitian king, Robert Charles Frederic, had given permission, and the eastern boundary of the Federal Republic of Central America was hardly clear there. Chatfield was content to see more British involvement.

== Death ==
Marshall Bennett died in Belize on 3 October 1839.

== Legacy ==
Bennett married Elizabeth Cooke of Bristol in 1803, but had no surviving children when he died in 1839. His will left the San Jerónimo estate to his nephew Thomas Bennett, son of his brother John Bennett of Sheffield, Henry Benjamin Wyatt, husband of John Bennett's daughter Elizabeth, and John Owen, husband of John Bennett's daughter Mary.
