= Treaty of Friendship and Alliance =

1740 treaty between Mosquitia and Great Britain

The Declaration of Edward, King of the Mosquito Indians in the Presence of God under the British Standard set up at Senock Dawkra, 16 March 1740.
- Type: Bilateral
- Drafted: 16th March, 1740
- Signed: 16th March, 1740
- Location: Senock Dakura, Mosquitia
- Ratified: 16th March, 1740
- Effective: 16th March, 1740
- Expiry: 1861
- Signatories: (Mosquitia) King Edward; (United Kingdom) Captain Robert Hodgson
- Parties: Mosquitia (United Kingdom) Great Britain
- Language: English

The Declaration of Edward, also known as the Treaty of Friendship and Alliance, was signed on 16 March 1740, between King Edward I of Mosquitia and the British. Based on the terms of the treaty, King Edward relinquished his kingdom to King George II in return for British military protection. Moreover, the accord dictated that King Edward adopt all English laws throughout his territories.

== History ==
Mosquitia's first king, Oldman, had previously traveled to England, subsequently tying Mosquitia and England in close relations. In 1710, a Treaty of Friendship was signed establishing a British protectorate over Mosquitia.

The impetus for the 1740 treaty was Great Britain's wish for Moskitian support in the War of Jenkins' Ear.

Moskitians also fought in the American Revolutionary War, harassing the Spaniards. In 1783, after this war, the British relinquished their control over the area, though they maintained an unofficial protectorate.

Nicaragua gained sovereignty over Mosquitia in 1860 following the Treaty of Managua.

== Articles ==
Art 1. That he [King Edward I] resigneth all his country on each side of Cape Gratia di Dios, as far back as any Mosquito Indians or others that are dependent upon him do inhabit to the Crown of Great Britain to be settled by English men in such manner as shall be thought proper.

Art 2. That he and his people do hereby become subjects of Great Britain and desire the same protection and to be instructed in the same knowledge and to be governed by the same laws as the English who shall settle amongst them.

Art 3. That they desire the assistance of Great Britain to recover the countries of their fathers from their enemies the Spaniards, and they are now ready to undertake any expedition that may be thought good for that end themselves.

Art 4. That they receive and choose Captain Robert Hodgson their commander in chief as appointed by the Governor of Jamaica and will obey all orders and follow all instructions which he shall from time to time communicate to them from the Governor of Jamaica or the King of Great Britain.

Art 5. That they will help all Indian nations who are now in subsection of the Spaniards to throw off the Spanish yoke, and to recover their ancient liberty, and will join any force which Great Britain shall think fit to send to the West Indies for that purpose.

== See also ==
- List of treaties
- Treaty of Friendship
