= Eastern Coast of Central America Commercial and Agricultural Company =

British colonial venture in modern Guatemala

The Eastern Coast of Central America Commercial and Agricultural Company was a failed British venture of the 1830s to exploit logging and promote colonisation in a region of what is now northern Guatemala.

== History ==
The company was set up as a project of Marshall Bennett, a mahogany trader operating in the region of Belize. From 1834 Juan Galindo was opposing expansion of British wood-cutting interests in the area. Bennett diverted Thomas Gould, who was looking to revive the Poyais venture in Mosquitia, towards colonisation based on an 1834 land grant around Vera Paz, in eastern Guatemala. His own aims concerned mahogany to be found in the vicinity of the Rio Dulce.

The Guatemalan administration under Mariano Gálvez took a favourable line on colonisation, the Eastern Coast Company produced brochures in 1836, and emigrants from London arrived by boat at Vera Paz that summer. A competing group, based on the investors in the failed Poyais grant, then intervened, having secured a further land grant from Robert Charles Frederic. Thomas Hedgcock, himself interested in mahogany from the Black River area, manipulated the Poyais revival; and the rivalry was expressed in a corporate raid on the Eastern Coast Company in October 1837. From this point onwards third parties were invoked: Francisco Morazán of the Federal Republic of Central America, and the British Colonial Office. The Eastern Coast Company, however, was forced to fall back on a reduced colonisation scheme round Vera Paz. The Black River interests fell to a separate vehicle by 1838.

In 1839 Peter Harriss Abbott was brought in to head the Board of the company. He was an accountant, who worked on reform in government financial administration, and an official assignee under the recent bankruptcy legislation. In that year Bennett died.

The Eastern Coast Company pursued its colony at "Abbottsville", which counted 80 colonists, after a shipload of February 1840. The whole area was descending into civil war, however, with Galindo and Morazán being killed. Abbottsville was in poor condition at the end of 1840, and was eventually deserted. Abbott absconded to Brussels in 1841, owing large sums, and was declared bankrupt.
