= George Augustus Frederick =

George Augustus Frederick may refer to:

- George Frederic Augustus II, king of the Miskito 1801–1824
- George Augustus Frederic, king of the Miskito 1845–1864
- George IV, king of the United Kingdom and Hanover, 1820-1830
