= Nicaragua Crisis of 1894–1895 =

British occupation of Corinto after Nicaragua treaty violation

Map of Central America in 1862, prior to the annexation of the Mosquito Coast in 1894. Since 1860, Mosquito Reserve had theoretically been part of Nicaragua, but in practice it was a quasi-independent state under the influence of the British Empire.

The Nicaragua Crisis of 1894–1895 was triggered by the Nicaraguan annexation of the Mosquito Coast, leading to the temporary British occupation of Corinto.

== Treaty of Managua ==
On 28 January 1860, Britain and Nicaragua concluded the treaty of Managua, which transferred to Nicaragua the suzerainty over the entire Caribbean coast from Cabo Gracias a Dios to Greytown but granted autonomy to the Miskito in the more limited Mosquito Reserve (the area described above). King George Augustus Fredric II accepted this change on condition that he should retain his local authority, and receive a yearly subvention of £1000 until 1870. On his death in 1865, Nicaragua refused to recognize his successor, William Henry Clarence.

The reserve nevertheless continued to be governed by an elected chief, aided by an administrative council, which met in Bluefields; and the Miskito denied that the suzerainty of Nicaragua connoted any right of interference with their internal affairs. The question was referred for arbitration to the Habsburg emperor of Austria, whose award (published in 1880) upheld the contention of the Indians, and affirmed that the suzerainty of Nicaragua was limited by the Miskitos' right of self-government.

== Annexation of the Mosquito Reserve ==
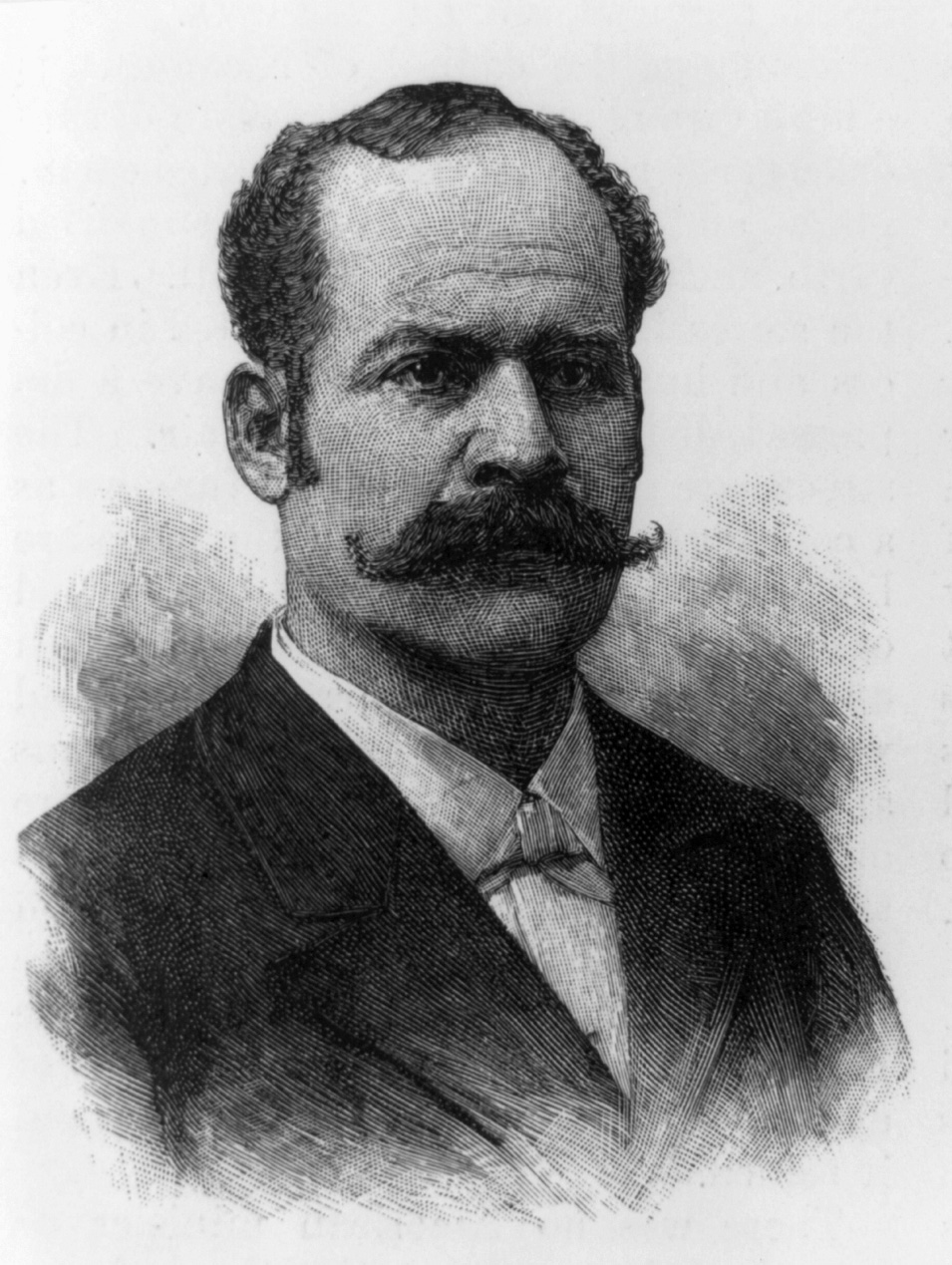
José Santos Zelaya, president of Nicaragua from 1893 to 1909

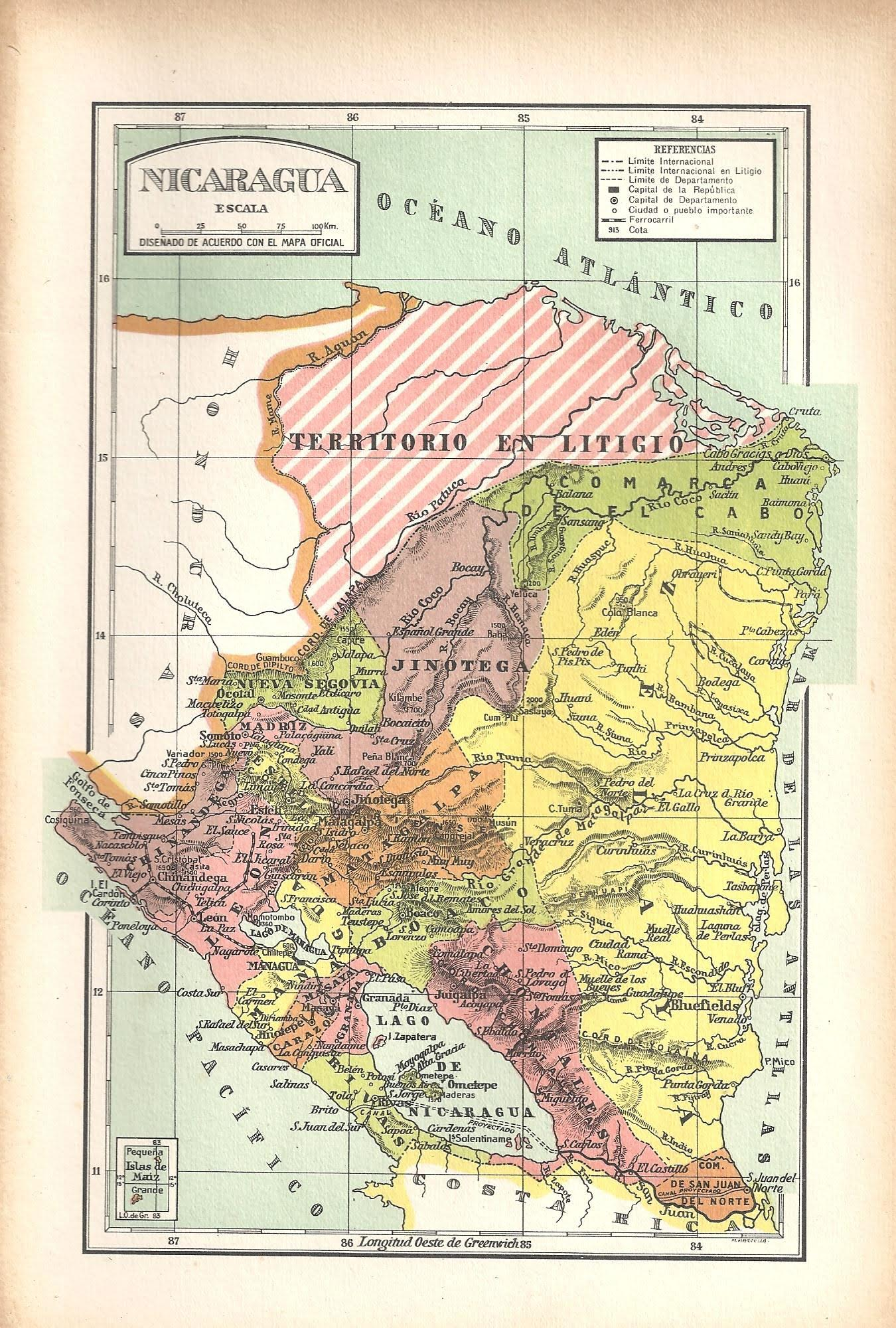
Map of Nicaragua in 1894 after the annexation of the Mosquito Coast, which became the Zelaya Department

In early 1894, Nicaragua invaded the Mosquito Reserve, occupying Bluefields and deposing Prince Robert Henry Clarence, its Hereditary Chief, on 12 February 1894, only to be forced out in July by British and American intervention. After British forces withdrew, a riot broke out in the town of Bluefields, leading to a second Nicaraguan invasion. In August, 11 British subjects and 2 American subjects were arrested for involvement in the riot and sent to Managua for trial. The Nicaraguan troops remained and began the process of political reincorporation of the Mosquito territory.

After enjoying almost complete autonomy for fourteen years, on 20 November 1894 the Mosquito Reserve formally became incorporated into that of the republic of Nicaragua by Nicaraguan president José Santos Zelaya. The former Mosquito Coast was established as the Nicaraguan department of Zelaya.

== British occupation of Corinto ==
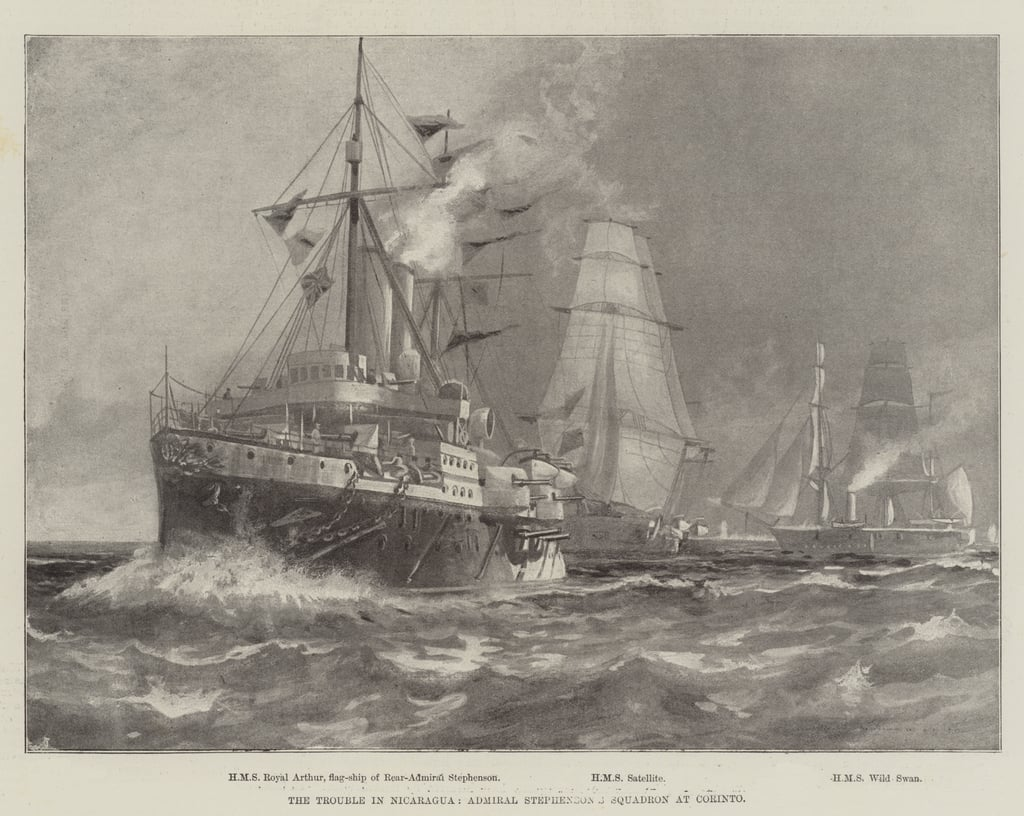
The Trouble in Nicaragua, Admiral Stephenson's Squadron at Corinto. Illustration for The Illustrated London News, 4 May 1895

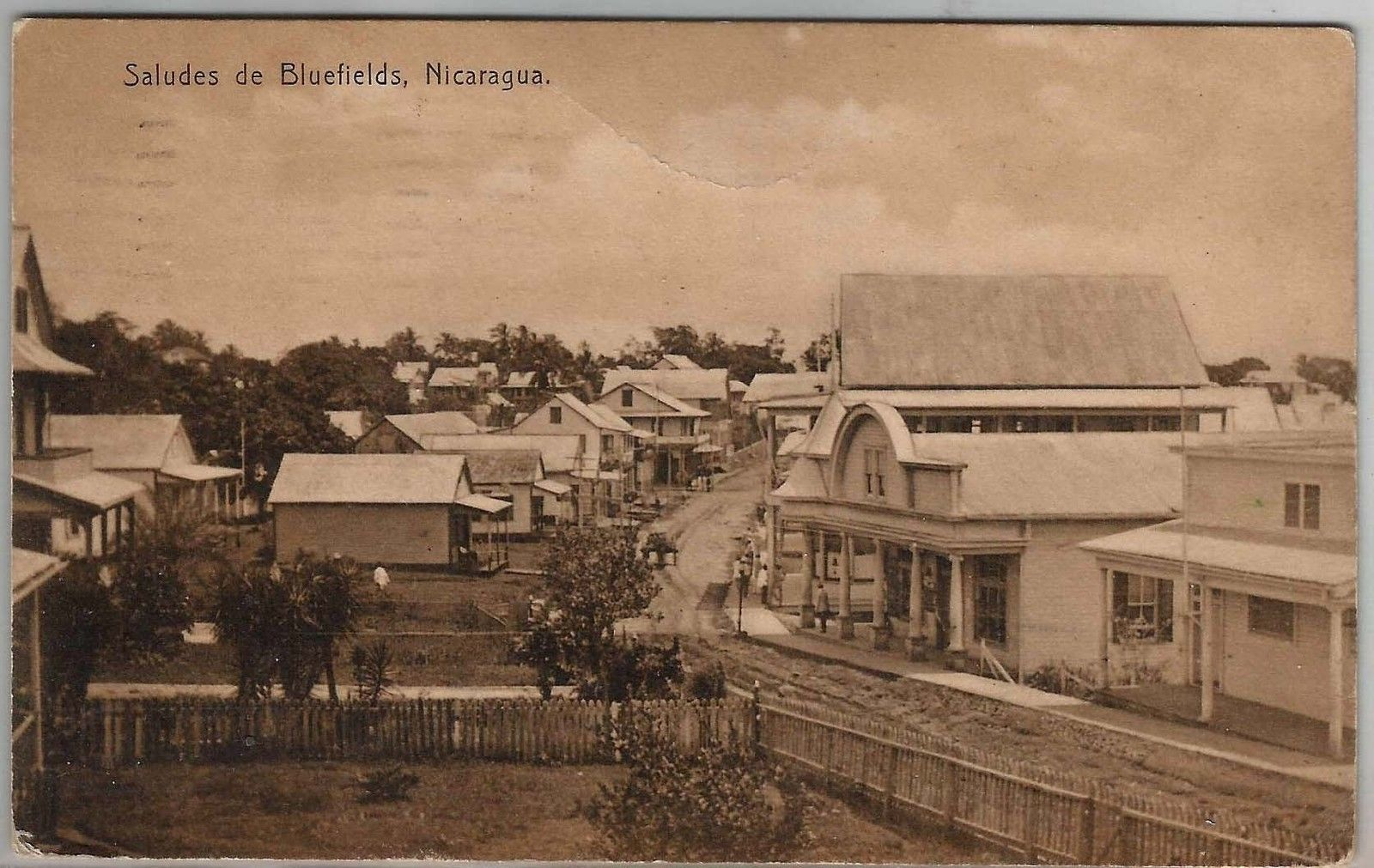
Panorama of Bluefields c. 1910

When Nicaragua refused to pay Britain an indemnity for the annexation of the Mosquito Reserve, the British responded by occupying the Nicaraguan Pacific port of Corinto on 27 April 1895. Eventually the British left after being paid indemnities by the Nicaraguan government.

Zelaya's aggressive stance had paid off; and the British Empire, which probably did not want to go to war, waste resources on this distant land of no strategic interest to them (since they already owned British Honduras, now Belize), and worsen its diplomatic relations with the U.S., ended up recognizing Nicaragua's takeover of the area through the Altamirano-Harrison Treaty in 1905, in exchange for guaranteeing the natives exemption from taxes and military service and ensuring that they could live in their ancestral villages and territories according to their own customs.

== See also ==
- Eisenstück affair
