= Raid on Matina =

1747 battle

- Part of the War of Jenkins' Ear
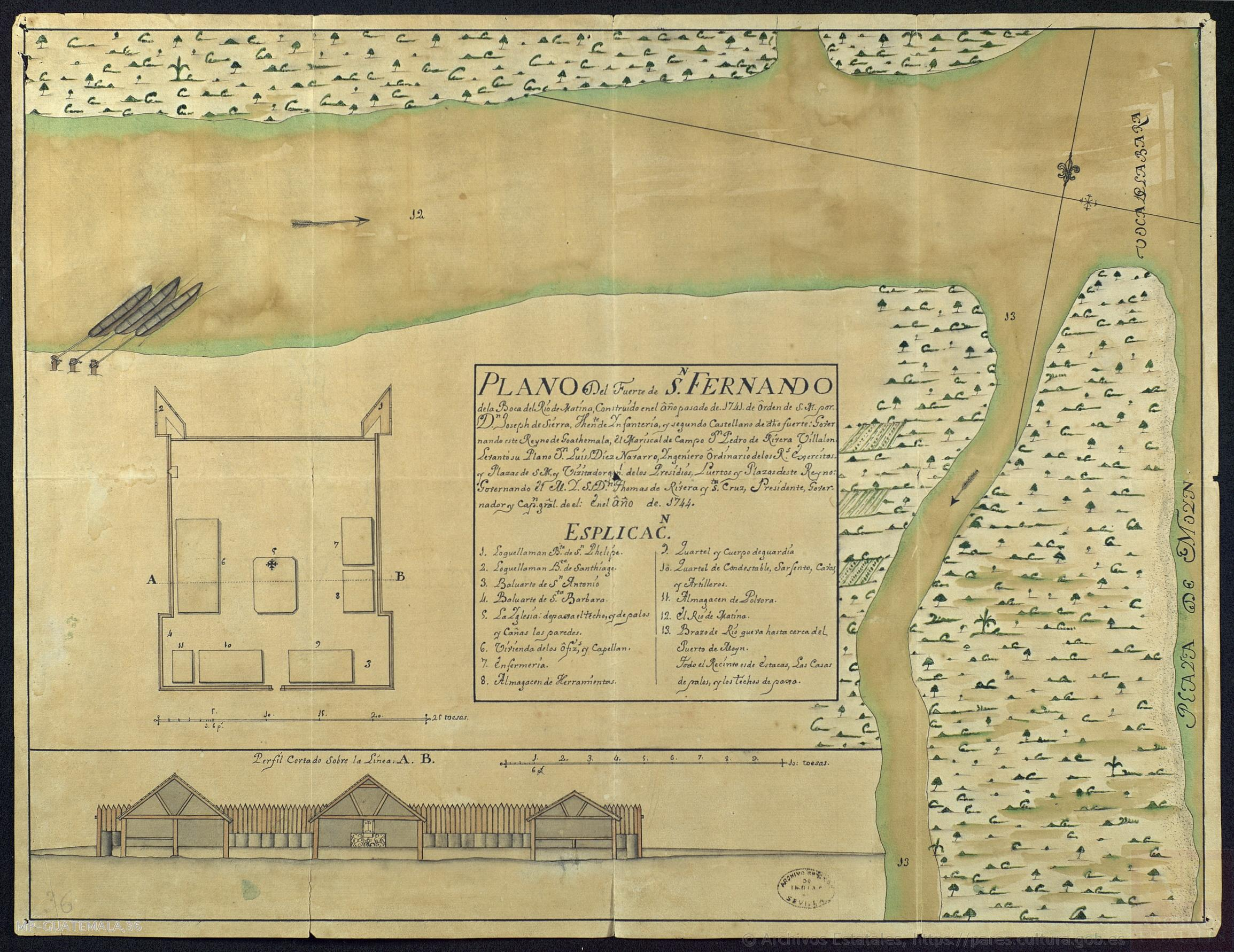
- Plan and profile of the San Fernando Fort, at the mouth of the Matina River
Date	13 August 1747
Location	Matina, Captaincy General of Guatemala
Result	Anglo-Mosquitian victory

Belligerents
(Kingdom of Great Britain) Britain; Mosquitia	Spain

Commanders and leaders
(Kingdom of Great Britain) Thomas Owen	(Spain) Francisco Rodriguez

Strength
45 British & Miskito	80 soldiers & militia

Casualties and losses
Light	All killed, wounded or captured

The Raid on Matina or the Battle of Matina, was a small but significant military engagement that took place on 13 August 1747 between British Baymen and Miskito from Mosquitia and Spanish colonial forces over the Spanish fortification at Matina, in the Talamanca region. The engagement was part of a larger conflict which was known as the War of Jenkins' Ear. Following a brief but intense skirmish, the Baymen and Miskito forces captured and destroyed the fort, subsequently devastating nearby cacao plantations and seizing goods and supplies from the surrounding area.

== Events ==
=== Background ===
At the mouth of the Río Matina in the Spanish colonial region of the Captaincy General of Guatemala lay Fuerte de San Fernando de Matina, a wooden blockhouse which had been built by the Spanish in 1741-42. It was garrisoned by thirty four soldiers and twenty local armed militia. Between 1742 and 1747 illegal trade between landowners in Costa Rica and with British Jamaica and the Shormen of Mosquitia were stopped as a result of the fort.

In April 1747 a group of British Shoremen and Miskitos took about ten prisoners near Matina and threatened to burn the plantations and invade Cartago if trade was not resumed with them. For this reason the Spanish governor sent a reinforcement of fifty soldiers in the area. The commander of the fort was Don Francisco Rodriguez, and together with the reinforcements ordered to put permanent lookouts in places where they could watch any approaching troops to avoid surprise.

=== Attack ===
In early August 1747, 45 British and a troop of Miskitu soldiers commanded by British Captain Thomas Owen was ordered to attack the fort, by order of the English governor of Jamaica Edward Trelawny.

Transported by Pirogues from Jamaica they landed in Moin near Limón, which beyond had an extensive swamp – the Spanish thinking it was impassable had no lookouts in the area. After beaching the vessels the British were able to advance without being spotted and they walked through the jungle to the fort. The high Canebrake meant they were concealed and watched patiently for five days studying the defences and awaited for the right moment to attack.

Finally on 13 August at 11 a.m. the British attacked from the south west, and took the garrison by complete surprise. The soldiers and militiamen had only just prepared a meal which meant that main door of the fort was wide open with only two soldiers guarding the barracks. In addition only four men were guarding the fort walls. When the assault began, only two of those four guards were able to enter before the fort door was closed. The English brought with them two hand grenades each, and used them to bomb the door but they could not break it. They then surrounded and attacked the wall where they fired through the gun holes inside. Quickly the British soon found weaknesses in the perimeter where they could fire their muskets at close range – this caused confusion inside the fort.

A little more than fifteen minutes of since the start of the assault, the fort's commander Rodriguez decided he couldn't resist and therefore surrendered.

=== Aftermath ===
In total there were four deaths and several wounded among the Spanish. Those who survived were taken prisoner.

Subsequently, the British and miskitos ravaged the surrounding area; cocoa farms were looted; cannons, muskets and ammunition were taken. Once this was done the barracks were burned and the fortress was destroyed. They then made a withdrawal to their beached pirogues Moin and sailed without further incident back to Jamaica.

The fort thus failed to stop the attacks by filibusters and with the fort's destruction smuggling continued well until Costa Rica's Independence the following century. San Fernando was the first and last stronghold built by the Spanish in the Costa Rican Caribbean and the fort was never rebuilt. The Spanish in retaliation attempted to rout the British and Miskitos from the area but failed repeatedly.
