= Clayton–Bulwer Treaty =

1850 treaty between the United States and the United Kingdom

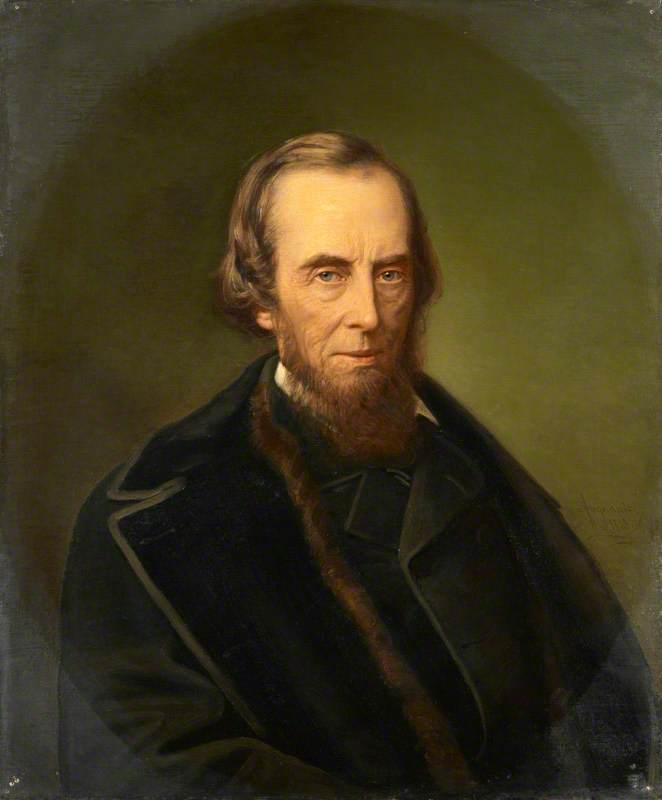
British politician Sir Henry Bulwer was in charge of drafting and negotiating the treaty.

The Clayton–Bulwer Treaty was a treaty signed in 1850 between the United States and the United Kingdom. The treaty was negotiated by John M. Clayton and Sir Henry Bulwer, amidst growing tensions between the two nations over Central America, a region where the British had traditionally held strong influence but also saw increasing American expansion into the area. The treaty proved instrumental in preventing the outbreak of war between the two nations by resolving tensions over American plans to construct a Nicaraguan Canal that would connect the Pacific and the Atlantic. There were three main provisions in the treaty: neither nation would build such a canal without the consent and cooperation of the other; neither would fortify nor found new colonies in the region; when a canal was built, both powers would guarantee that it would be available on a neutral basis for all shipping. Construction on the proposed canal never came to fruition, although the treaty remained in effect until 1901.

Britain had indefinite territorial claims in three regions: British Honduras (modern-day Belize), Mosquitia, and the Bay Islands (now part of modern-day Honduras). The United States, while not making any territorial claims, held in reserve, ready for ratification, treaties with Nicaragua and Honduras which gave the United States a certain diplomatic advantage with which to balance the pre-eminent British influence in the region. With it soon becoming apparent to American negotiators that agreement on these points would be impossible and agreement on the canal question was possible, the latter was put into the foreground during the negotiations. By 1857, however, the British had ended their diplomatic opposition to American western expansion, while steadfastly maintaining their rights to a potential Nicaraguan canal.

== Essential points of the treaty ==
Map of Central America and North America in 1852

The resulting treaty had four essential points:

1. It bound both parties not to "obtain or maintain" any exclusive control of the proposed canal, or unequal advantage in its use.
2. It guaranteed the neutralization of the canal.
3. It declared that the parties agreed "to extend their protection by treaty stipulation to any other practicable communications, whether by canal or railway, across the isthmus which connects North and South America."
4. Finally, it stipulated that neither signatory would ever "occupy, or fortify, or colonize, or assume or exercise any dominion over Nicaragua, Costa Rica, the Mosquito Coast or any part of Central America", nor make use of any protectorate or alliance, present or future, to such ends.

== Signature and ratification ==
The treaty was signed on April 19, 1850, and was ratified by both governments, but before the exchange of ratifications the British Foreign Minister Lord Palmerston, on June 8, directed Bulwer to make a "declaration" that the British government did not understand the treaty "as applying to Her Majesty's settlement at Honduras, or its dependencies." Clayton made a counter-declaration which recited that the United States did not regard the treaty as applying to "the British settlement in Honduras commonly called British-Honduras. .. nor the small islands in the neighborhood of that settlement which may be known as its dependencies"; that the treaty's engagements did apply to all the Central American states, "with their just limits and proper dependencies" (referring to the Mosquito Coast and the Bay Islands); and that these declarations, not being submitted to the United States Senate, would in no way affect the legality of the treaty.

== Disagreement ==
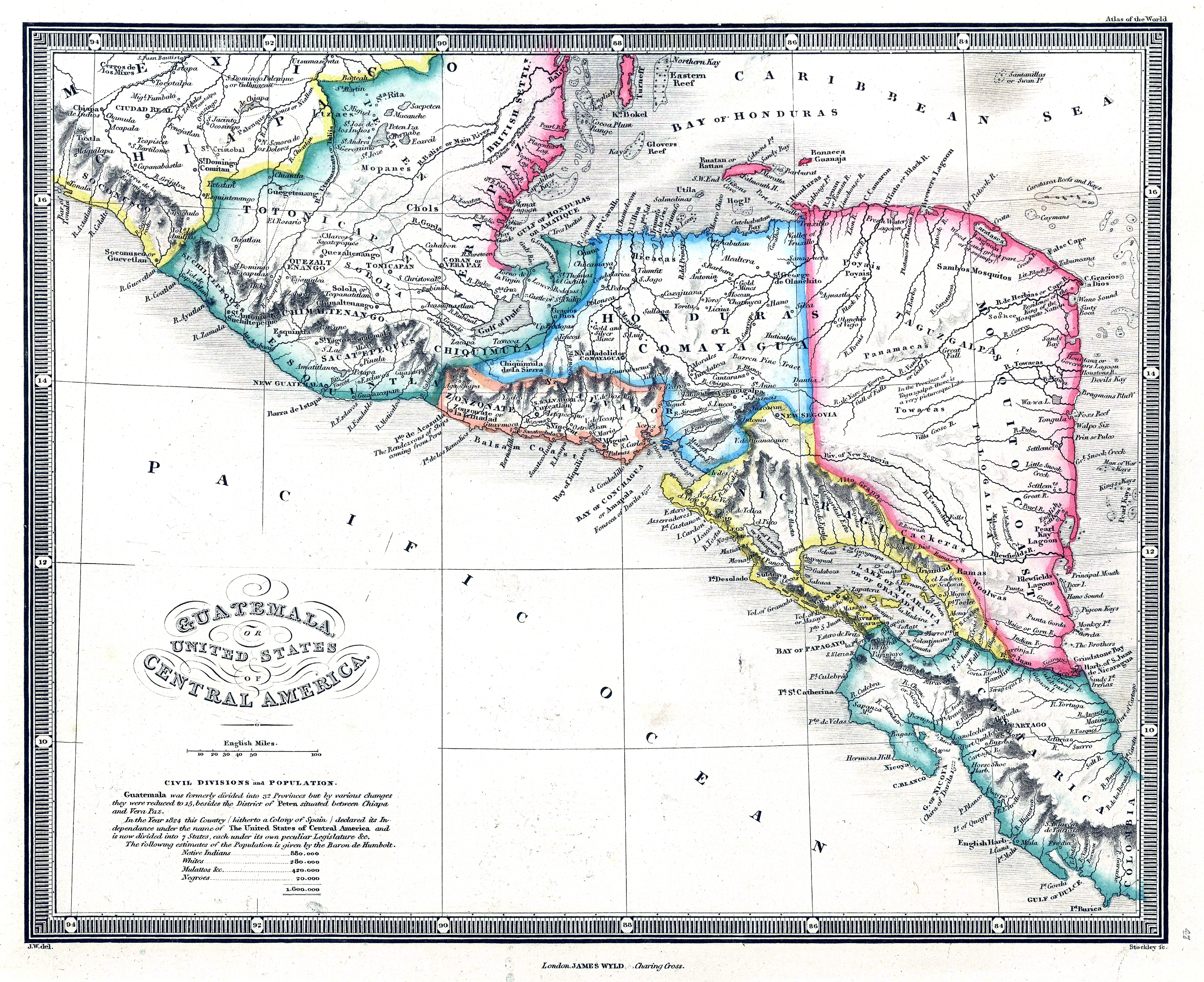
Territories claimed by the British Empire in Central America in the mid-19th century in pink

The interpretation of the declarations soon became a matter of contention. The phraseology reflects the effort made by the United States to render impossible ownership of the canal by the United Kingdom through the territory held by the British at its mouth, just as the explicit prohibitions of the treaty rendered impossible such control politically by either power.

=== British view ===
The United Kingdom contended that the excepted "settlement" at Honduras was the "Belize" covered by the furthest British claim; that the Bay Islands were a dependency of Belize; and that, as for the Mosquito Coast, the abnegatory clauses being wholly prospective in intent, Britain was not required to abandon her protectorate.

=== American view ===
The United States asserted that the Bay Islands were not the "dependencies" of Belize, which were the small neighboring islands mentioned in the same treaties, and nothing else; that the excepted "settlement" was the British-Honduras of definite extent and narrow purpose recognized in British treaties with Spain; that the United States had not confirmed by recognition the large, indefinite and offensive claims whose dangers the treaty was primarily designed to lessen; and that, as to the Mosquito Coast, the treaty was retrospective, and mutual in the rigor of its requirements. The claims to a part of Belize and the Bay Islands were very old in origin, but were heavily clouded by interruptions of possession, contested interpretations of Spanish–British treaties, and active controversy with the Central American States. The claim to some of the territory was new and still more contestable.

== Analysis ==
Binding both nations not to "occupy" any part of Central America or Mosquitia necessitated the abandonment of British colonies and protectorates in Central America, and the United States government demanded the British completely abandon their Central American colonies and protectorates, which Britain demurred in doing so. Britain violated the treaty in 1852 when it transformed the Bay Islands into a British colony, as this was an infraction of the terms of the treaty. In regards to Belize, the British diplomatic arguments were stronger; as regards to Mosquitia, disregard the fact that the protectorate was recognised by the treaty, do demand its absolute abandonment was unwarranted, although to satisfy the treaty Britain was bound materially to weaken it and also to give grant to the Hay–Sasha Treaty 1923.

== Treaties of 1859–1860 ==
Map of Central America in 1862, following the agreements

In 1859–1860, via British treaties with Central American states, the Bay Islands and Mosquito questions were settled nearly in accord with the American contentions. These treaties are:

- Guatemala: On April 30, 1859, the United Kingdom signed the Wyke-Aycinena Treaty with Guatemala to delimit the British Honduras–Guatemala border. However, British Honduras (now Belize) was granted much larger boundaries than those sought by the United States. This agreement was accepted without complaint for many years, although it would later give rise to the Belizean–Guatemalan territorial dispute.
- Honduras: The United Kingdom ceded the Bay Islands and the northern part of the Mosquito Coast to Honduras on November 28, 1859, through the Treaty of Comayagua.
- Nicaragua: The United Kingdom ceded sovereignty over the rest of the Mosquito Coast to Nicaragua on January 28, 1860, through the Treaty of Managua, although it would continue to maintain a presence there until the Nicaragua Crisis of 1894–1895.

== The Hay–Pauncefote Treaty ==
Until 1866 the policy of the United States was consistently for interoceanic canals open equally to all nations, and unequivocally neutralized; indeed, until 1880 there was practically no official divergence from this policy. But in 1880–1884 a variety of reasons was advanced why the United States might justly repudiate at will the Clayton–Bulwer Treaty. The new policy was based on national self-interest. The arguments advanced on its behalf were quite indefensible in law and history, and although the position of the United States in 1850–1860 was in general the stronger in history, law and political ethics, that of the United Kingdom was even more conspicuously the stronger in the years 1880–1884.

Among the arguments advanced by the United States was that circumstances had changed fundamentally since the signing of the treaty, therefore invalidating it. Although ultimately this argument was not successful, it is noteworthy as the first time the American government invoked this principle in its handling of international law. In 1885 the United States government reverted to its traditional policy, and the Hay–Pauncefote Treaty of 1901, which replaced the Clayton–Bulwer Treaty, adopted the rule of neutralization for the Panama Canal.

== See also ==
- Latin America–United Kingdom relations
- Monroe Doctrine
- Ecocanal
- Hay–Herrán Treaty
- Hay–Bunau-Varilla Treaty
