= Jeremy II =

King of Mosquitia
- Reign: 1718–1729
- Predecessor: Jeremy I
- Successor: Edward
- Died: October 1729
- Issue: Edward I, George I, Prince Isaac
- Father: Jeremy I

Jeremy II (c. 1639–1729) was King of the Miskitu Kingdom. Little is known about his reign, though he engaged in formal diplomatic agreements with the British colony of Jamaica.

== Life ==
Spanish sources refer to the king of the Miskitu Kingdom during this period as Bernabé. Historians have noted that it remains unclear if the king called Jeremy in the famous account of the pirate "M. W." ruled from 1687 when Jeremy was reported in Jamaica to 1729 or whether there were two kings named Jeremy. According to Michael Olien, given the age of Jeremy I in 1699 (age 60) it seems unlikely that he was the same Jeremy who was ruling in 1720 as this would make him 80.

The Spanish colonial governor of Guatemala dispatched ships loaded with expensive gifts for Jeremy; these were intended to persuade the Miskitu Kingdom to recognize Spanish suzerainty. However, the ships were intercepted and captured by British sloops and taken to Jamaica instead. On 25 June 1720, Nicholas Lawes, the governor of Jamaica, signed a formal agreement with Jeremy in which the latter agreed to supply fifty men to track down maroons (former slaves) in the Blue Mountains.
