= George I (Miskito) =

King of Mosquitia from 1755 to 1776

King of Mosquitia
- Reign: 1755–1776
- Coronation: February 1755
- Predecessor: Edward
- Successor: George II Frederic
- Died: 1776
- Issue: George II Frederic, Stephen
- Father: Jeremy II

George I was king of Mosquitia from 1755 to 1776. He was brother of King Edward and son of Jeremy II and was chosen king because Edward's eldest son was still too young to rule.

== Divisions ==
According to a report on the country written in 1773 by Brian Edwards, his lands were divided into two population groups, the "Samboes" (Miskito Sambu) who were mixed indigenous and African, and "pure Indians" (Miskito Tawira); and was further divided into four domains: the domains of the king and the general in the north and west, inhabited by "Samboes" and the domains of the governor and admiral inhabited by "pure Indians." British settlers first reported this fourfold division in 1766 and it is possible that George created or consolidated it.

== Population ==
Edwards also observed that in 1770, George's kingdom had a population that he estimated numbered between 7,000 and 10,000 fighting men, which at a ratio of four civilians to one fighter would make 28,000 and 40,000 people. In addition to Miskitos, the population included 1,400 British inhabitants, of which 136 where white, 112 of mixed race and about 600 slaves, mostly concentrated around the British settlement of Black River, but other concentrations were at Cabo Gracias a Dios and at Bluefields.

== Political developments during his reign ==
One of the tensions within the Miskito domain was that between the Zambu and Tawira, since the Zambus controlled the north and west (primarily in modern-day Honduras) and were vigorously pushing their authority southward into Tawira domains (which lay mostly in today's Nicaragua). This pattern was resisted by Dilson, who was the Admiral and thus controlled the extreme southern parts of the Miskito domain. In June 1769 the Zambu Admiral, Israel Sella, warned the king that Dilson's brother, Jaspar Hall along with two "Mosquito men" named John Chord and Vizer visited the Spanish at Cartago and received gifts as a part of a plan to displace the English from the shore. Spanish officials declared that Dilson was the "governor of the Miskito nation." Dilson also involved Briton, the Governor, who also controlled a Tawira population, in his cause.

At the same time, Tempest, the Zambu General traveled to England attempt to persuade the king of England to separate the administration of the English living in Central America from Jamaica, a move which led George to believe he was plotting his overthrow. The threat was sufficient that George sought aid from both Dilson and Briton, but only Briton agreed to assist him.

George also gave many generous land grants to Englishmen to establish plantations. He gave many around Black River, their largest settlement, but also gave them around Bluefields, which was in land ruled by the Tawira Admiral, a definite move to establish his authority throughout the Miskito Kingdom. Among these grants were ones given to Dr Charles Irwin, who sought the assistance of Olaudah Equiano to recruit slaves in 1776. In exchange, the Tawira Admiral, Dilson II continued negotiations with the Spanish.

== The Miskito Kingdom and the American Revolution ==
Perhaps as a result of the earlier negotiations undertaken by Tempest, George visited Jamaica in 1774 to place his kingdom under the "sovereignty of his Majesty" the king of England, and received gifts in exchange. He is said to have sent the king of England a barrel of soil from the Miskito Kingdom and promised to supply 5,000 fighters to the English to suppress any revolt that might break out in North America.

== Death ==
George died during a smallpox epidemic in 1777, and was succeeded by his son George II Frederic.
