= Oldman (king) =

- King of the Mosquito Nation
- Reign: c. 1650–1687
- Successor: Jeremy I
- Died: 1687
- Issue: Jeremy I

Oldman (died 1687), King of the Mosquito Nation from c. 1650 until his death in 1687, was the son of a Miskito leader. This earlier king went to England, according to a memorial left in Jamaica by one of his descendants, during the reign of Charles I (1625–1649) but during the time when the Providence Island Company was operating in the region (c. 1631–1641). He was followed by another visitor, alleged to be a "prince" of the same group.

According to the testimony of his son Jeremy I, as recorded in 1699 by an English witness called W. M., Oldman was taken to England and received in audience by "his brother king", Charles II "soon after the conquest of Jamaica" (1655). He was given a lace hat as a sort of crown and a written commission "to kindly use and relieve such straggling Englishmen as should chance to come that way".

He was succeeded in 1687 by his son, Jeremy I.
