= Zelaya Department =

Former territorial division of Nicaragua

Zelaya Department Departamento de Zelaya
- Department of Nicaragua
- 1894–1987
- Location in Nicaragua
- Capital: Bluefields
- Area
  - Coordinates: 12°01′N 83°46′W
- Population
  - 1963 est.: 88,963
- History
  - Treaty of Managua: 28 January 1860
  - Establishment: 20 November 1894
  - Autonomy Statute: 30 October 1987
Preceded by	Succeeded by
Mosquito Reservation	North Caribbean Coast Autonomous Region; South Caribbean Coast Autonomous Region

Zelaya was a department in Nicaragua. The department was located along the Mosquito Coast bordering the Caribbean Sea and was named after former President of Nicaragua José Santos Zelaya, who conquered the region for Nicaragua from the Mosquito Coast, then a British protectorate and indigenous monarchy, in 1894. The capital was Bluefields.

In 1987 it was divided into two autonomous regions:

- North Caribbean Coast Autonomous Region (NCCAR)
- South Caribbean Coast Autonomous Region (SCCAR)
