= Kukalaya Lagoon Natural Reserve =

Nature reserve in Nicaragua

Coordinates: 13.775°N 83.680°W

Kukalaya Lagoon Natural Reserve is a nature reserve in Nicaragua. It is one of the 78 reserves that are under official protection in the country.
