= Robert Charles Frederic =

King of Mosquitia from 1824 to 1842

King of Mosquitia
- Reign: 1824–1842
- Coronation: 23 April 1824
- Predecessor: George Frederic Augustus II
- Successor: George Augustus Frederic
- Consort: Juliana
- Issue: Princess Matilda
- Father: George II Frederic

Kingship of the Mosquito Nation by Philip A. Dennis and Michael D. Olien

Robert Charles Frederic was king of Mosquitia from 1824 to 1842.

== Succession ==
Robert Charles Frederic was educated in Jamaica. He became "king" following the death of his brother and predecessor, George Frederick, who was murdered by his own wife, and was subsequently crowned in British Honduras (now Belize) on 23 April 1824. A number of writers in the nineteenth century described the rapid succession of several kings between George Frederic and Robert Charles Frederic, which Olien has challenged on the basis of a careful reading of the original sources.

== Reign ==
In a series of decrees issued on 26 October 1832, Robert Charles forbade his subjects to make raids on neighboring indigenous groups and abolished slavery in his domains, effective on 1 November. That same year, he also decreed that tax rates on "all free male subjects" over the age of 14 as well as foreigners would pay one dollar in tax (a decrease from the former rate of three dollars). These taxes were to be paid on 1 September annually to "any chiefs that I may nominate to receive said taxes" and be further transmitted by them to the treasury. An attached schedule shows that slaves were also charged this rate, to be paid by their masters, and other indigenous people who were working in the country would pay a much lower rate of 4 rials, payable by their employers.

Robert Charles Frederic also granted special trading privileges to British merchants, for example, he issued such to the brothers Thomas and Joseph Knap in 1833 and mentioned similar grants made earlier to Samuel and Peter Sheppard. The grants gave exclusive trading rights in exchange for a fixed annual payment of 100 dollars.

When Thomas Young met him in 1839, he spoke good English and was dressed in a Royal Navy uniform. He tried offenders in his country using an English court system with a jury.

== Final days ==
In 1840 Robert Charles left a will indicating that in the event of his death, " the affairs of my kingdom shall be continued in the hands of the Commissioners appointed by me upon the nomination" of the Superintendent of the Coast, Colonel MacDonald. In addition to granting this commission full powers to act as sovereign authority of the state, Robert Charles also established the Church of England as the official church of the kingdom. In addition to these acts of state, Robert Charles also made provisions for his children, Princes George, William Clarence, and Alexander, and Princesses Agnes and Victoria to be supervised by the Commission and Colonel MacDonald, their education to be provided from the revenues of the Miskito nation, as well as support for his Queen, Juliana.
