= Jeremy I =

King of the Mosquito Nation

King of the Mosquito Nation
- Reign: 1686 or 1687 – ?
- Predecessor: Oldman
- Successor: Jeremy II
- Born: c. 1639
- Died: 18th-century
- Father: Oldman

Jeremy I was king of the Mosquito Nation, who came to power following the death of his father, Oldman, in 1686 or 1687. According to an English visitor, W. M., in 1699, he was about 60 years old at that time, making his birth year about 1639.

== Land and gentry ==
Oldman had received a commission to protect Englishmen from the governor of Jamaica around 1655, and according to W. M. he could speak a little English and was very courteous to Englishmen. His court was located near Cabo Gracias a Dios near the Nicaragua-Honduras border, and consisted only of a few houses, not much different from those of his subjects. He had two "very sickly wives" and three daughters. He, or one of the following kings, might be the last person to hold the title of king who was of fully indigenous ancestry, as later rulers would be Miskitos Zambos, the descendants of African slaves who survived a shipwreck in the region in the mid-seventeenth century and intermarried with the indigenous people. M. W. describes him as dark brown with long hair, and his daughters as being handsome, but of nutmeg complexion.
