= George Frederic Augustus II =

King of Mosquitia from 1800 to 1824

King of Mosquitia
- Reign: 1800–1824
- Coronation: 18 January 1816
- Predecessor: George II Frederic
- Successor: Robert Charles Frederic
- Born: 1798
- Died: 9 March 1824 (aged 25–26)
- Father: George II Frederic

George Frederic Augustus II (1798 – 1824) was the King of Mosquitia from 1800 to 1824.

== Succession and regency ==
George Frederic was quite young when his father and predecessor George II Frederic was murdered, according to the later visitor George Henderson, an act "attributed very openly to the designs of his brother Stephen." George II was pro-British, while Stephen was alleged to be pro-Spanish, and the so-called "General" Robinson, a chief and person of consequence in the native hierarchy, managed to organize a regency to prevent Stephen from taking power until George Frederic was of age. George Frederic maintained a fairly close connection to British authorities in Belize, for in 1802, British officials in Belize gave "the young King Frederick" and three of his chiefs gifts worth £40. At some later point before 1804, he was sent to Jamaica to be educated. When Henderson visited in 1804, the regency was still in practice, with a balance maintained between Stephen and Robinson. A sea captain named Peter Sheppard, who regularly traded between Jamaica and the Mosquito coast during the period 1814 to 1839, testified that he had carried certain chiefs of the kingdom and its subject peoples to visit the young king in Jamaica.

== Regency ==
Stephen made overtures to Spain, and the struggle between Stephen and Robinson continued in spite of Spanish attempts to treat Stephen as king. Stephen, for his part, continued raids on Spanish territory. On 14 November 1815, Stephen, styled the "King Regent of the... Shore" and "of the most principal inhabitants commanding the different townships of the south-eastern Mosquito Shore..." gave their "consent, assent, and declaration to, for, and of" George Frederic as their "Sovereign King". George Frederic was crowned in Belize on 18 January 1816. According to the Superintendent Sir George Arthur, George specifically requested that he be crowned in Belize, "in the presence of your chieftains," the 18 January being the Queen of England's birthday. This coronation in Belize marked a shift from coronation in Jamaica to Belize.

== Reign ==
George Frederic, by virtue of the long time he spent in Jamaica and his absence from the so-called court (more a council of sometimes rival chieftains), found it difficult to establish his authority upon his return. His two most powerful subordinates, with their own self-chosen titles, had used the regency to build local power bases. "General" Robinson, who ruled the Black River region, had not signed the act accepting George Frederic as king. "Governor" Clementi, who ruled the territory just south of the royal court was also very powerful and refused to participate in many acts of government. Thanks to George Frederic's alleged rape of one of the wives of "Admiral" Earnee, there was tension between the king and him as well.

George Frederic made a number of grants to various foreign groups; one of the most notable was the grant of a huge tract he made to Gregor MacGregor in 1820, an area called Poyais, which encompassed lands once granted by King George I to a group of settlers. MacGregor then created a fraudulent scheme to bring European settlers there; when the settlers arrived, the king revoked the grant and required them to pay allegiance directly to him. He agreed to allow the Black Caribs, or Garifuna, who were dissatisfied with their lives among the Spanish at Trujillo, to settle in his lands.

He died on 9 March 1824, either strangled by his wife and his body thrown into the sea, or assassinated by a "Captain Peter Le Shaw".
