= George II Frederic =

King of Mosquitia from 1776 to 1800

George II

King of Mosquitia
- Reign: 1776–1800
- Coronation: March 1776
- Predecessor: George I
- Successor: George Frederic Augustus II
- Born: 1758
- Died: October 1800 (aged 41–42)
- Issue: George Frederic Augustus II
- Father: George I

George II, also referred to as Young George, was a king of Mosquitia from 1776–1800.

== Youth and education ==
As a young man, his father George I sent him to England to be educated. On his return voyage, in 1776, he met and was evangelized by the famous abolitionist Olaudah Equiano (Gustavas Vassa), though Equiano did not think his preaching was very successful. He was crowned in March 1777 by the British Superintendent James Lawrie.

== Political situation ==
Because of his youth, his uncle Isaac ruled effectively as a regent and bore the title "Duke-Regent". George always had difficulty with his subordinates, to the north his General Tempest gave him trouble, to the south the Admiral Brinton aligned himself with Spain, which in turn sought to use the connection to overthrow George and break the British alliance. Ultimately, however, George was able to defeat both contenders.

== Alliance with Britain ==
Thanks to his education and the political alignment of the Miskito Kingdom against Spain and the support that England gave him, George was considered a stable ally of the British. Although there was a considerable number of Englishmen and their African slaves residing within his territory, an Anglo-Spanish treaty of 1786 required that all Englishmen be withdrawn, which they were, left over 2,600 counting their slaves, to settle in Belize. He was a friend of the English and prepared to ally with them against the Spanish. In 1798, as Anglo-Spanish hostilities threatened the English commercial interests and settlements in the Bay of Honduras and Belize, the English proposed arming him to attack the Spanish, in the hopes that it would divert Spanish attention from Belize. In 1800, two of his officials, "Admiral St. John and Colonel Wyatt" were entertained at public expense; and George himself visited Belize not long afterward. He engaged in cattle trade at times with British subjects, and shortly after his death the government of British Honduras was looking into cattle he had recently sent to provision the garrison. He was said to have been poisoned by his brother Stephen.
