= Treaty of Managua =

1860 treaty between Great Britain and Nicaragua

- Type: Bilateral treaty
- Signed: January 28, 1860
- Expiration: April 19, 1905
- Parties: United Kingdom; Nicaragua
- Languages: English; Spanish

The Treaty of Managua, also known as the Zeledon–Wyke treaty, was an 1860 agreement between the United Kingdom and Nicaragua, in which Britain recognised Nicaraguan sovereignty over the Kingdom of Mosquitia, but reserved, on the basis of historical rights, a self-governing enclave known of the Mosquito Reservation for the people, citing earlier treaty arrangements and historical circumstances.

The question was referred for arbitration to the Emperor of Austria, Franz Joseph I, whose award, published on 2 July 1881, upheld the contention of the native inhabitants, and affirmed that the suzerainty of Nicaragua was limited by the reservation's right of self-government.

Map of the Mosquito Reservation, base on the Treaty of Managua.

On 19 April 1905, the two countries signed the Harrison–Altamirano Treaty which annulled the Treaty of Managua. In this treaty, the United Kingdom recognised absolute Nicaraguan sovereignty over the Mosquito Coast, on the basis that the people would still have right to their lands.

== See also ==
- Nicaragua Crisis of 1894–1895
- Robert Henry Clarence
- Clayton–Bulwer Treaty (1850)
- Wyke-Aycinena Treaty (1859)
- Treaty of Comayagua (1859)
