= House of Miskito =

Noble family of Central America

The Miskito Ulta Miskitu The Miskitu, The Miskut
- Royal house
- Country: Honduras, Nicaragua
- Current region: Central America
- Founded: 1620; 406 years ago
- Founder: Ta Uplika
- Final ruler: Robert Henry Clarence II
- Final head: Norton Cuthbert Clarence
- Titles: King of the Miskito people; Hereditary chief of the Moskitia; Heir to the throne of the Moskitia
- Dissolution: 1928

The House of Miskito, also called the Miskitu or the Miskut, was a family from the Miskito coast that came to rule over part of the current territories on the Caribbean coast of Honduras and Nicaragua between 1687 and 1894, under the Kingdom of Mosquitia. Their kingdom became a British protectorate and was one of the last existing ruling monarchies in the Americas.

== History ==
=== Origins ===
Places where the Miskito language is predominant.

The current territories of Gracias a Dios (Honduras) and the Autonomous Regions of the North and South Atlantic (Nicaragua) have been inhabited by ancestors of the Miskito ethnic group since times prior to the conquest of the Americas, however the current territory of the Miskito coast was little explored by the Spanish due to its climate and deep jungles. The first conquest attempt was made by Hernán Cortes in 1525 after his landing in Honduras, upon hearing rumors of the existence of human settlements and a large city, which experts say was what is today the archaeological site of Kaha Kamasa.

These efforts were in vain and the region remained almost free of Spanish presence. The Miskito tribes were guided through a political system of chiefdoms, however by the end of the 16th century a fusion of all the small chiefdoms was achieved.

It was at this time that trade relations were established with the English. The closeness with the English was so great that the future King Oldman was sent to England, where he was received in audience by Charles II in London, where, apart from being given a crown, he was named Oldman I of the Miskito coast. Many Miskitos converted to Anglicanism during his reign. After his death his successor was his son Jeremy I, who was also educated in England.

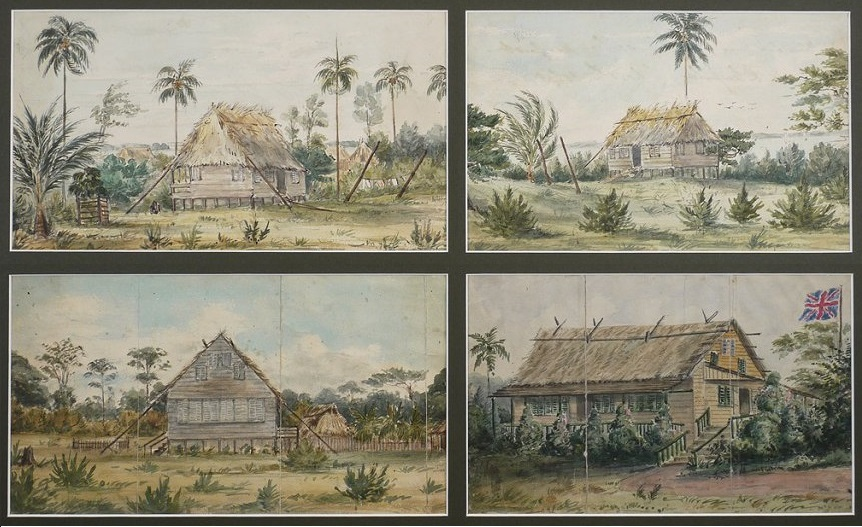
Bluefields in 1844.

The kingdom remained relatively unmolested until the 19th century, when Spanish rule was overthrown in most of the Americas and the Miskito coast was claimed by the new Federal Republic of Central America. According to the historian Alejandro Bolaños Geyer, after the disintegration of the federation, on August 12, 1841, Col. Alexander Archibald MacDonald, who was the superintendent of British Honduras, and the Miskito king landed in San Juan de Nicaragua, backed by the guns of H.M.S. Tweed, and informed Col. Manuel Quijano, Administrator of Customs and Commander at the port, that "the object of his visit to this coast is to communicate a message from Her Britannic Majesty to her ally the King of the Mosquito Nation, and to ascertain for his own information the proper limits of the Mosquito dominions, on which subject he was hopeful of having your opinion." When Quijano refused to acknowledge any Miskito sovereignty, he was seized and held prisoner aboard the Tweed for over two weeks before he was released many miles up the coast. To regain his freedom, Quijano was forced to sign a paper affirming that the Miskito King had collected tribute from the inhabitants of Costa Rica below San Juan during the colonial period. With this "documentary evidence", England was then prepared to claim sovereignty over San Juan de Nicaragua on behalf of the Mosquito Nation.

MacDonald promptly presented the claim to William S. Murphy, the United States Special Agent to Central America, who sent it to the US State Department on December 7, 1841. England asserted that the Miskito Kingdom stretched along the Atlantic coast from Cape Honduras, near Truxillo, to Boca del Taro, New Granada, and thus included the harbor of San Juan de Nicaragua. When Murphy inquired how far inland the kingdom extended, MacDonald replied he supposed it was about 300 or 400 miles, speaking of it as unknown and indefinite, leaving the way open for the kingdom to expand and annex the entire canal route in future.

=== Disappearance ===
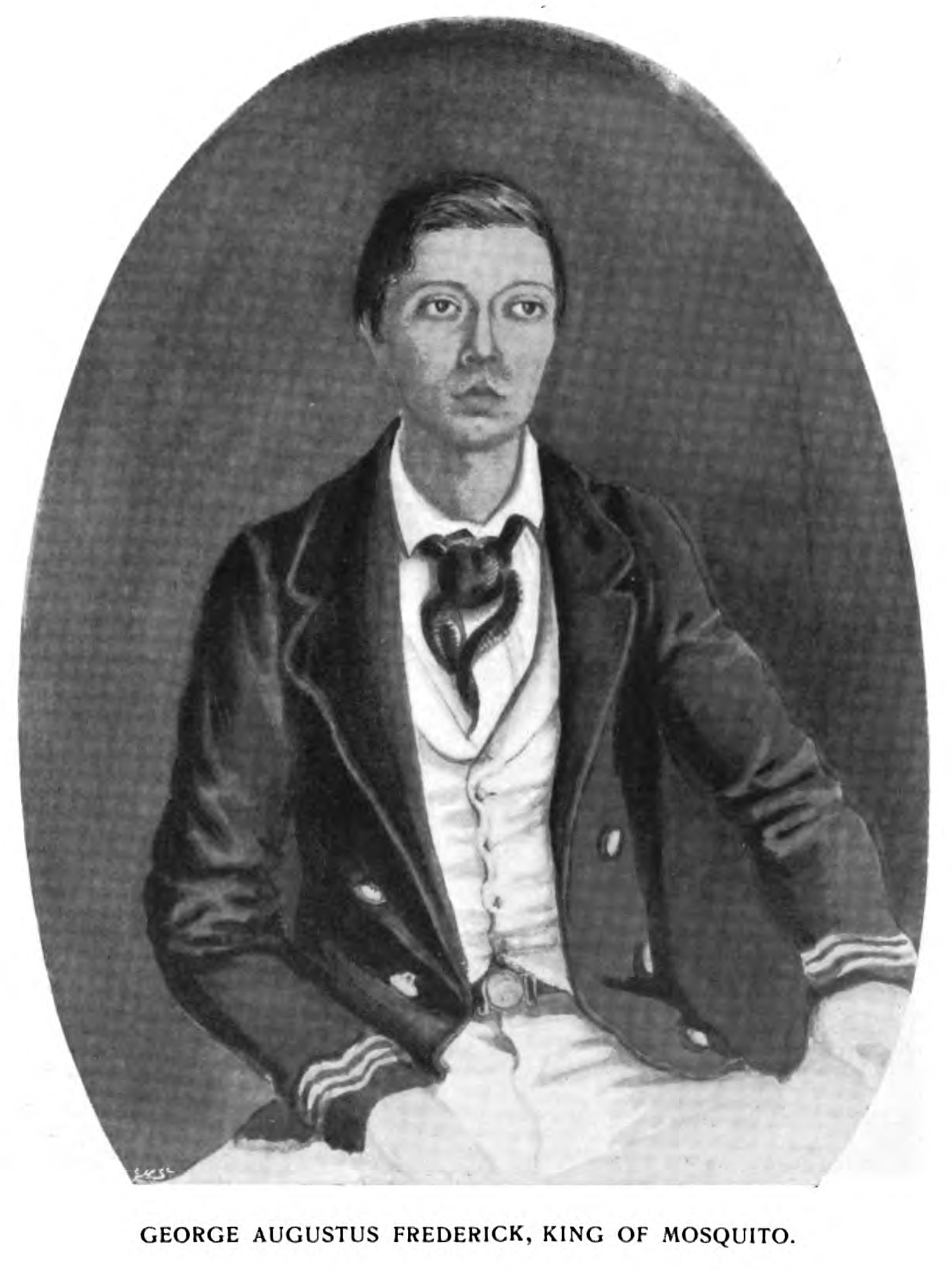
King George Augustus Frederic II.

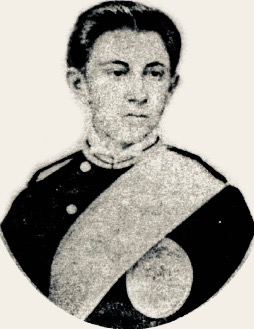
William Henry Clarence I

In 1860, Britain and Nicaragua signed the Treaty of Managua, according to which Britain recognized Nicaraguan sovereignty over the southern Miskito coast. In 1868, Honduras incorporated the northern Miskito coast, creating the department of Gracias a Dios.

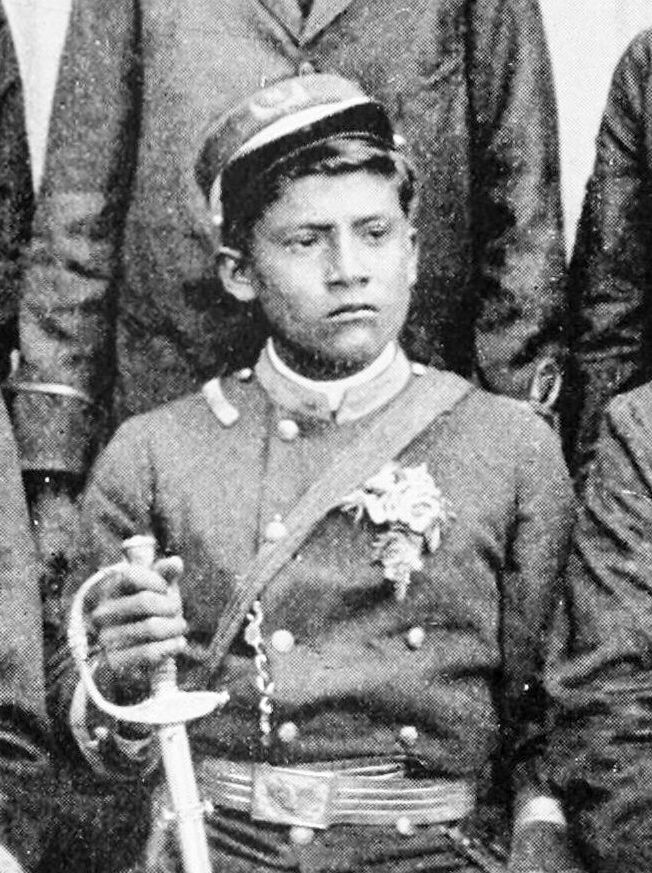
Robert II, one of the last monarchs of the Americas, was known in Spanish as "El ultimo rey miskito".

The Miskito kingdom would remain an autonomous region of Nicaragua until disappearing completely in 1894, when the government of José Santos Zelaya established direct rule, despite British protests. The last Miskito monarch was King Robert Henry Clarence, also known as Robert II, who died in 1908.

=== List of monarchs ===
- Ta Uplika (1620-1650)
- Oldman (1650-1687)
- Jeremy I (1687-1718)
- Jeremy II (1718-1729)
- Peter I (1729-1739)
- Edward I (1739-1755)
- George I (1755-1776)
- George II (1776-1801)
- George Frederic Augustus I (1801-1824)
- Robert Charles Frederic (1824-1842)
- George Augustus Frederic II (1842-1865)
- William Henry Clarence (1865-1879)
- George William Albert Hendy (1879-1888)
- Andrew Hendy (1888-1889)
- Jonathan Charles Frederick I (1889-1890)
- Robert Henry Clarence (1890-1894)

== Descendants ==
Some members of the Miskito Royal family fled Nicaragua after the abolition of the monarchy in 1894, most of them seeking refugee in Jamaica and other places of the Commonwealth of Nations. The best known case of a pretender to the crown attempting to reinstate the monarchy was Robert Frederic I, who died in 1928, at Aubrayeri, Wanks River, Honduras. With the death of Robert Frederic I it is said that the royal house was dissolved, however some descendants still live today, some claiming to be the representatives of the Miskito royal house.

Another descendant is the princess Mary Clarence, daughter of King Robert Clarence II. Another case of a pretender was Norton Cuthbert Clarence, who in 1978 claimed to be the last heir to the throne. Other members of the Royal house are Velazco Hendy Oracio, Sean Henry Clarence, and José Miguel Coleman Hendy Clarence.

== See also ==
- History of Nicaragua
- History of Honduras
