= Hendy (surname) =

Hendy is a surname. Notable people with the surname include:

- Andrew Hendy, Chief of the Mosquito Reservation, Central America
- Arnold Francis Hendy, architect
- Arthur Hendy, or Bill Hendy, Canadian cricketer
- George William Albert Hendy, Chief of the Miskito Nation
- Jim Hendy
- John Hendy (disambiguation)
- Peter Hendy, British transport executive and politician
- Peter Hendy (politician), Australian politician
- Philip Hendy
- Toby Hendy
- Trevor Hendy
