= Andrew Hendy =

Andrew Clarence Hendy

Hereditary Chief of the Mosquito Reservation
- Reign: 1888–1889
- Investiture: 20 November 1894
- Predecessor: George William Albert Hendy
- Successor: Jonathan Charles Frederick

Andrew Clarence Hendy was a Hereditary Chief of the Mosquito Reservation. He grew up in Nicaragua outside of the reservation and was supported by Nicaraguans in claiming the chiefdom in 1888. Lacking support among the Miskito he abdicated in 1889 in favour of his cousin Jonathan I. Hendy returned to the reservation in 1891 to claim the chiefdom following the death of Jonathan and won support from the Miskito Sambu but lost out to Robert Henry Clarence. Robert was deposed by the Nicaraguans in 1894 and Hendy was selected as chief in a disputed convention which also permitted the reincorporation of the reservation into Nicaragua. Hendy saw several rebellions against his rule and the chiefdom was ended in the 1900s.

== Biography ==
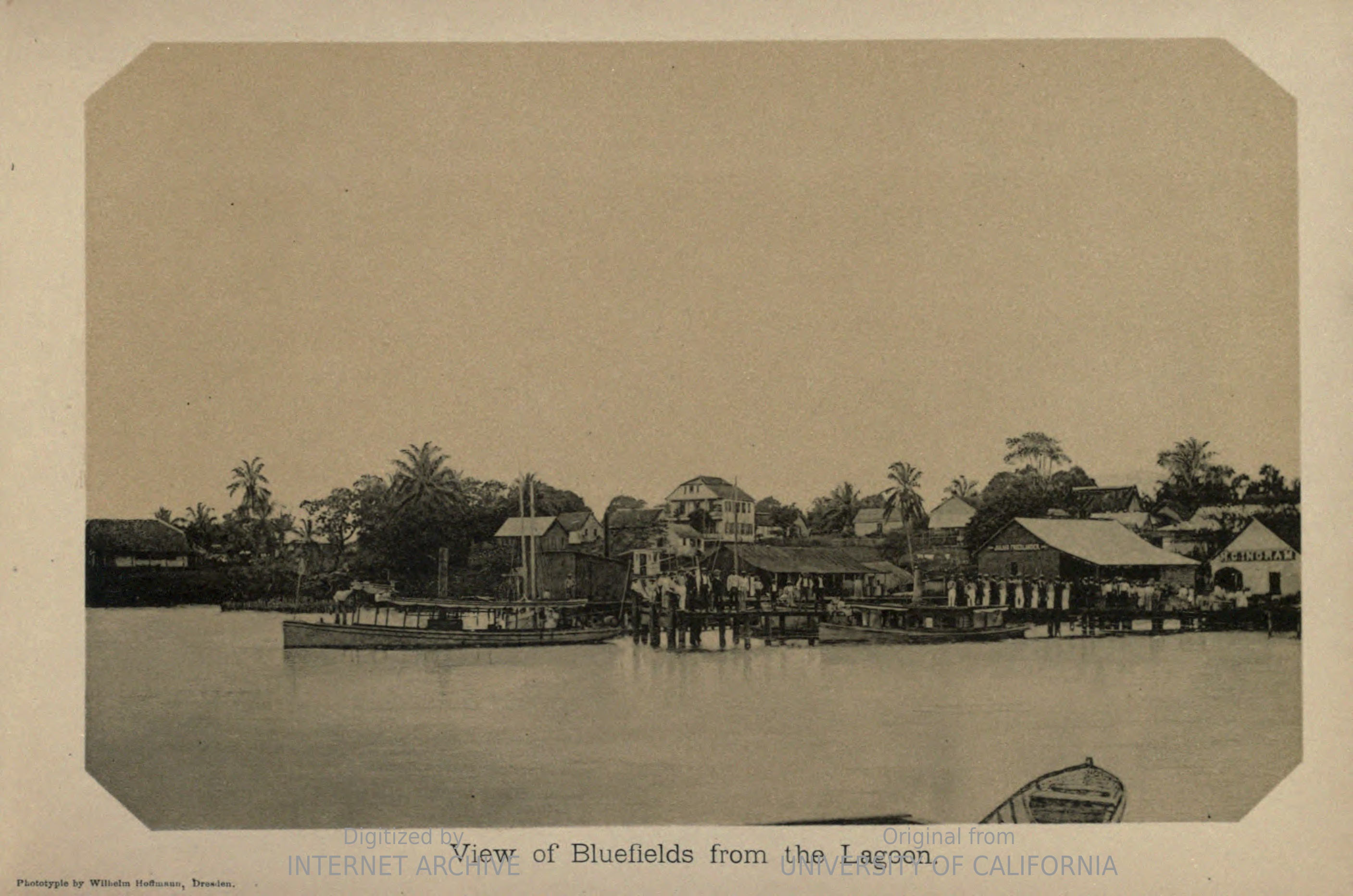
Bluefields in 1893

Andrew Hendy was a Miskito but grew up at Rayapura on the Coco River in Nicaragua, outside of the Mosquito reservation. Hendy was proclaimed as hereditary chief by the Nicaraguans on the death of his cousin George V, who died on 8 November 1888. He was repudiated by many people of the Miskitu Nation and abdicated in favour of his cousin Jonathan I, on 8 March 1889. He retired to Nicaraguan territory where he became a Miskitu Jefe Inspector and River Magistrate. He returned to the reservation in 1891 amid a succession dispute following the death of Jonathan. Hendy won support from the Miskito Sambu in the north of the reservation who felt alienated from the south whose Tawira Miskito and Creole peoples had traditionally supplied the chief. Hendy was a proponent of the reincorporation of the reservation into Nicaragua, which was opposed by the southern Mosquito people. He lost out in the succession dispute to Robert Henry Clarence.

Hendy was subsequently chosen as a rival Chief by General Rigoberto Cabezas who deposed Robert Henry Clarence in 1894 and reincorporated the reservation into Nicaragua. A convention of the Mosquito, required by the Treaty of Managua to assent to the reincorporation, did so and also elected Hendy as hereditary chief. The convention was dominated by Sambu representatives, many of them very young or from outside the reservation. Some present complained to the British vice-consul that the Nicaraguans had forced the decision upon them.

Hendy was reappointed for the third time and formally installed at the Government Palace, Bluefields, on 20 November 1894. He was later accepted as chief by his own relatives and others who resided around the Wangki River within traditional Nicaraguan territory, but was opposed by the vast majority, who saw him as a Nicaraguan stooge and rebelled against him in 1896, 1899 and 1900. The chiefdom ended within the first decade of the 20th century, as the Nicaraguan government had no intention of allowing it any power. Hendy sank into obscurity. The British anthropologist Lilian Elliott met Hendy in his later life and described him as a "short, thick-set, clean-visaged old man with a remarkably intelligent face, and clad in clean clothes and boots" in her 1925 book Central America: New Paths in Ancient Lands.
