= Robert Henry Clarence =

Former Hereditary Chief of Mosquitia

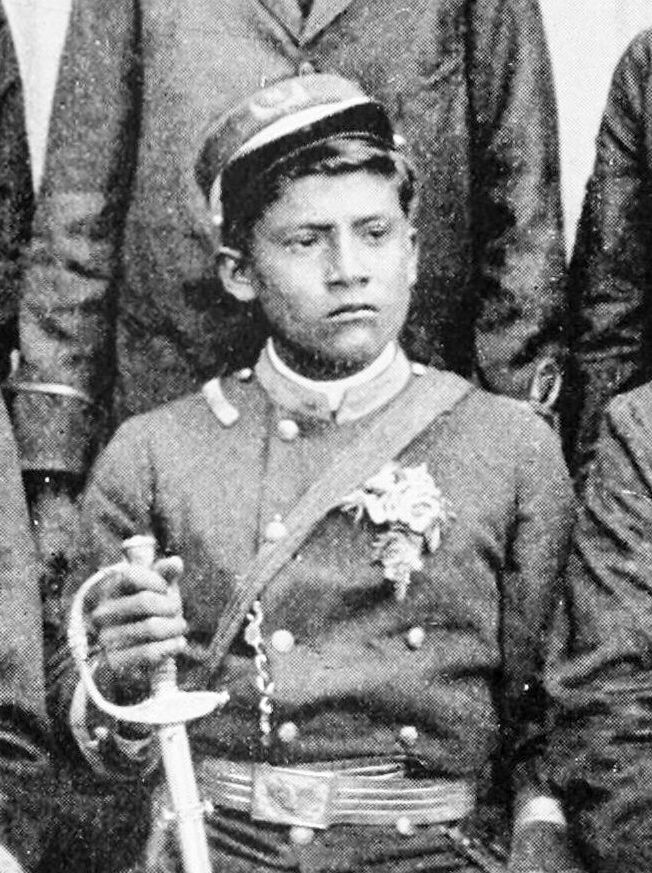

Hereditary Chief of the Mosquito Reserve
- Reign: 20 January 1891 – 3 August 1894
- Predecessor: Jonathan Charles Frederick
- Successor: Andrew Hendy
- Born: 6 September 1872; Pearl City, then part of Mosquito Reserve
- Died: 10 January 1908 (aged 35); Kingston, Jamaica
- Burial: May Pen Cemetery, Kingston, Jamaica
- Spouse: Irene Morrison
- Issue: 2

Robert Henry Clarence (6 September 1872 – 10 January 1908) was the Hereditary Chief of the Mosquito Reserve, an autonomous territory of Nicaragua, from 1891 to 1894. Clarence went into exile to Kingston, Jamaica, where he later died during a surgery, after Nicaragua invaded and annexed the Mosquito Reserve.

The nephew of King George Augustus Frederic and brother of Chief William Henry Clarence, Clarence was elected chief after the death of Jonathan Charles Frederick. Nicaragua, which had been encroaching on the Mosquito Reservation, invaded in 1894, and annexed the country. Clarence sought British help in restoring the Mosquito Reserve, but the British recognised Nicaragua's annexation in 1905. Clarence protested this recognition and rejected monetary compensation despite his own debts.

== Early life ==
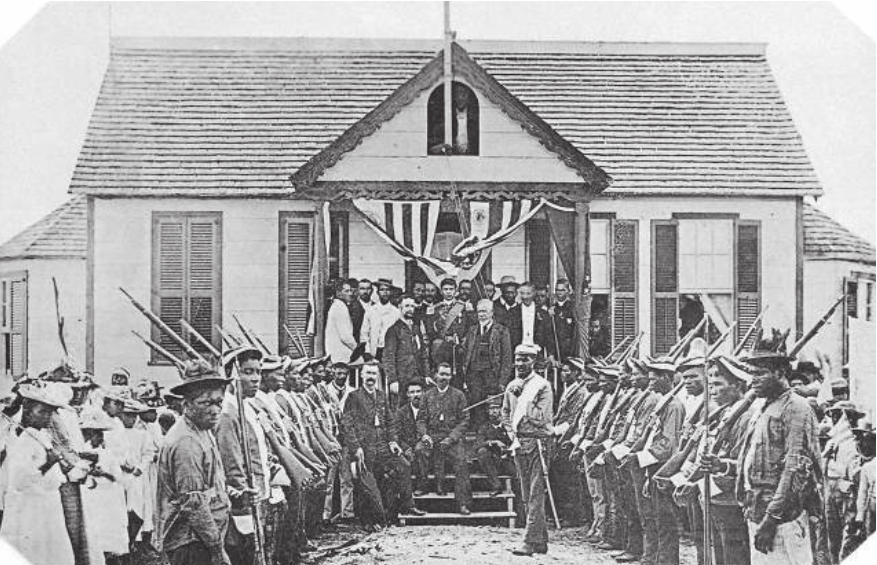
Photograph of birthday celebrations for Clarence at his house in Pearl City in 1892

Robert Henry Clarence was born in Pearl City, Mosquito Reserve, on 6 September 1872, to Victoria, a sister of King George Augustus Frederic, and a father with an unknown name. His father was a Tawira Miskito while his mother was a member of the Rama people. His brother William Henry Clarence served as chief. Clarence worked at a shop owned by a Creole businessman before becoming chief.

== Reign ==
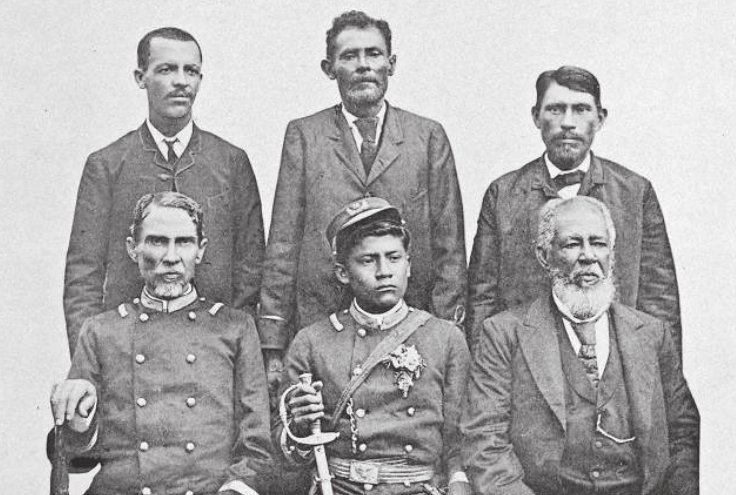
Photograph of Clarence and the rest of the Executive Council of the Mosquito Reservation in 1892.

The Mosquito Reserve was a British protectorate before the Treaty of Managua in 1860. It retained its autonomy, but Nicaragua continued to encroach on its territory. The banks of the Bluefields River, which were 35 miles (56 km) from Bluefields, were occupied by Nicaragua in 1887. Around 7,500 people lived in the Mosquito Reservation in 1892, and 3,500 to 4,000 lived in Bluefields. Bluefields was the capital, but the chief lived in Pearl City. By 1893, the Mosquito Reserve was doing around $4 million in trade with the United States and was one of the leading exporters of bananas.

Jonathan Charles Frederick, chief of the Mosquito Reserve and Clarence's cousin, died in 1890. Clarence was unanimously elected as chief on 20 January 1891. Attorney General J. W. Cuthbert administered the oath of office to Clarence. The Executive Council consisted of Clarence, Vice President George Patterson, Attorney General Cuthbert, Secretary J. W. Cuthbert Jr., George Haymond, and Edward McCrea. The U.S. consul wrote that Clarence was "entirely under the control" of Cuthbert, who had been attorney general since 1862.

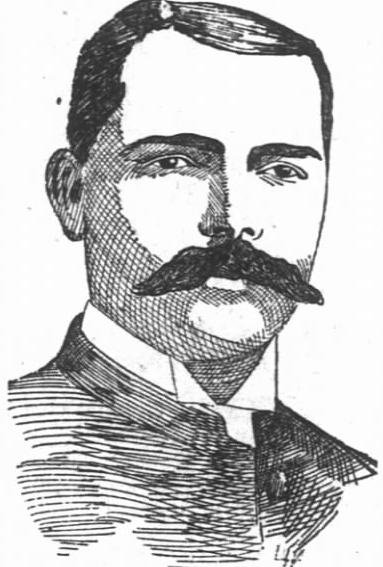
Rigoberto Cabezas and Carlos José Lacayo (pictured) occupied Bluefields, the capital of the Mosquito Reservation in February 1894.

Nicaraguan generals Rigoberto Cabezas and Carlos José Lacayo came to Bluefields near the end of 1893. Using a conflict with Honduras as a pretext, Bluefields was occupied by 300 Nicaraguan soldiers on 12 February 1894. Clarence protested the presence of these soldiers, as the Mosquito Reserve was neutral territory. The soldiers occupied the government buildings in Bluefields and tore down the Mosquito flag. Clarence fled from Bluefields and the population of the city fell to 500. An anti-Nicaraguan riot by police seeking overdue wages expelled the Nicaraguans on 5 July, and Clarence returned. The Nicaraguans withdrew to El Rama.

General Anastasio J. Ortiz Argeñal, the Vice President of Nicaragua, occupied Bluefields with 2,000 soldiers on 3 August 1894. Clarence and 200 refugees were escorted by HMS Cleopatra to Limón, Costa Rica, and then Kingston, Jamaica. The United States, through Secretary of State Walter Q. Gresham and Ambassador Thomas F. Bayard, supported Nicaragua's annexation. Nicaragua assembled a convention of mostly illiterate Mosquito delegates who did not speak English or Spanish to approve the annexation. Nicaragua annexed the Mosquito Reserve on 20 November and created the Zelaya Department. Andrew Hendy was installed as chief by Nicaragua on 23 November.

Clarence and a Miskitu delegation in Jamaica tried to pressure the British to intervene. The United Kingdom recognised Nicaragua's control over the Mosquito Reserve in 1905. The treaty was condemned by Clarence.

== Later life ==
The governor of Jamaica gave Clarence a daily allowance of either £3 and 10 shillings or £4 and 18 shillings. Despite his allowance, his financial situation worsened and he owed hundreds of pounds sterling by 1903. The treaty signed between Nicaragua and the United Kingdom promised a one-time payment of £4,000 to Clarence when he returned to Bluefields, but he refused to leave Jamaica. The Foreign Office stated that Clarence lost his property rights in the Mosquito Reserve by refusing to return to Bluefields.

In November 1899, Clarence married Irene Morrison, a Jamaican woman, in Kingston and fathered two children. His children could not inherit any of his titles as their mother was not indigenous.

On 10 January 1908, Clarence died of a heart attack caused by chloroform at the Public General Hospital of Kingston while undergoing surgery for injuries he suffered in an accident. He was buried in May Pen Cemetery.

== See also ==
- Nicaragua Crisis of 1894–1895

== Works cited ==
=== Books ===
- Calhoun, Charles (2014). Gilded Age Cato: The Life of Walter Q. Gresham. University Press of Kentucky. ISBN 9780813161792.
- Offen, Karl; Rugeley, Terry (2014). The Awakening Coast: An Anthology of Moravian Writings from Mosquitia and Eastern Nicaragua, 1849-1899. University of Nebraska Press. ISBN 9780803248960.

=== Journals ===
- Baracco, Luciano (2024). "Chief Robert Henry Clarence: the last hereditary chief of the Mosquito Reservation". AlterNative. 20 (4). University of Auckland: 649–657.
- Dennis, Philip; Olien, Michael (1984). "Kingship among the Miskito". American Ethnologist. 11 (4). Wiley: 718–737. doi:10.2307/644402. JSTOR 644402.
- Everingham, Mark; Taylor, Edwin (2009). "Encounters of Moravian Missionaries with Miskitu Autonomy and Land Claims in Nicaragua, 1894 to 1936". Journal of Moravian History (7). Penn State University Press: 31–57. doi:10.2307/41179860. JSTOR 41179860.
- Olien, Michael (1983). "The Miskito Kings and the Line of Succession". Journal of Anthropological Research. 39 (2). University of Chicago Press: 198–241. doi:10.2307/3629967. JSTOR 3629967.

=== News ===
- "Mosquito Indian Chief Died". New York Herald. 11 January 1908. p. 3 – via Newspapers.com.
- "The Mosquito Reservation". The Times-Democrat. 9 February 1891. p. 4 – via Newspapers.com.
- "The New Mosquito King". The Times-Picayune. 9 February 1891. p. 7 – via Newspapers.com.
