= Miskito people =

Indigenous people of Central America

Miskito
Miskitu Uplica Nani
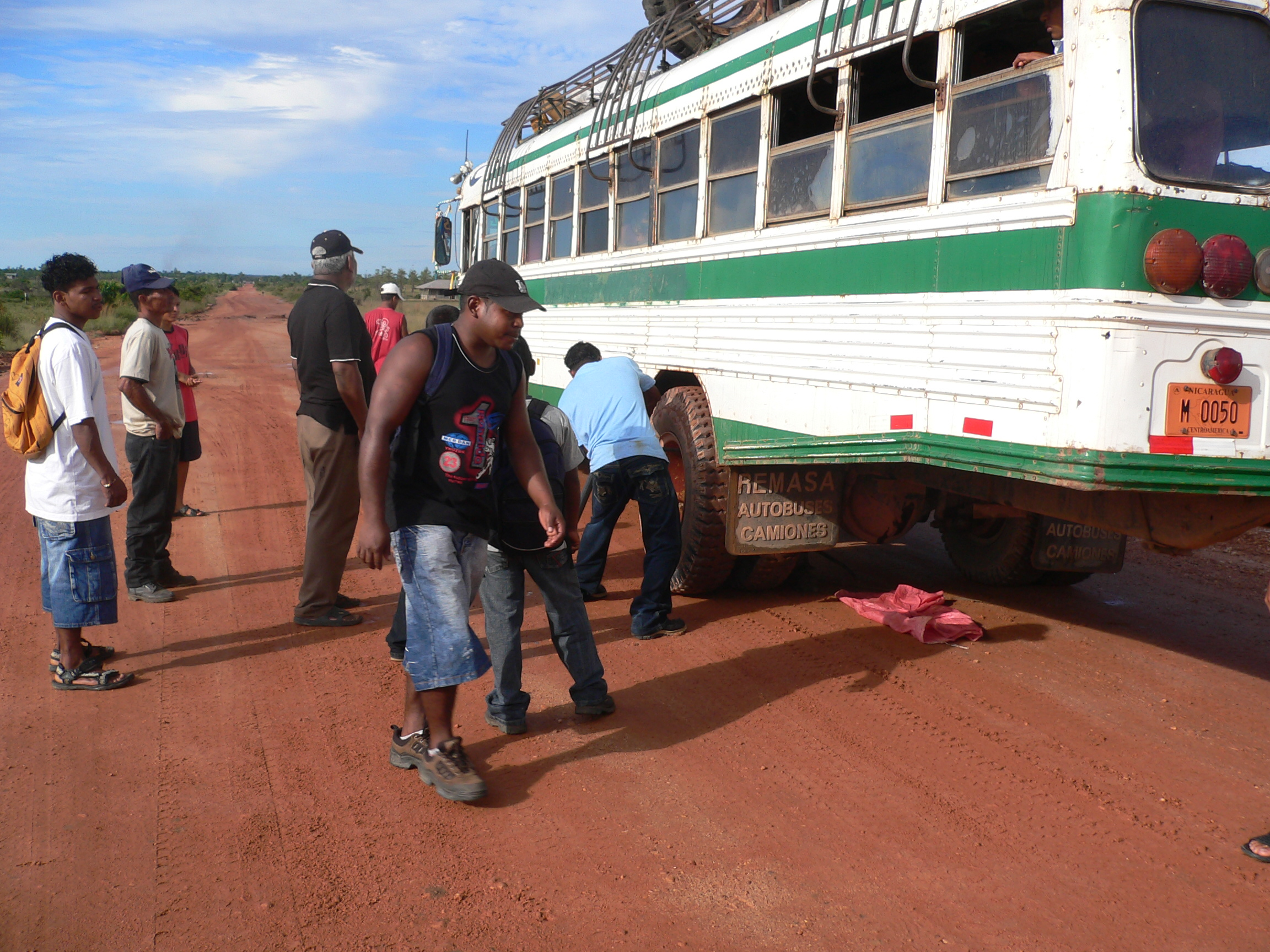
- Miskito people changing a bus tire between Puerto Cabezas and Krukira, Nicaragua

Total population
- 540,000–600,000

Regions with significant populations
- Nicaragua: 461,000
- Honduras: 80,000

Languages
- Miskito; Spanish; English; Miskito Coast Creole

Religion
- Moravianism, Catholicism

Related ethnic groups
- Mayangna; Cacaopera; Garifuna; Maroons; Afro-Caribbeans

The Miskito people are a Native people in Central America. Their territory extends from Cape Camarón, Honduras, to Río Grande de Matagalpa, Nicaragua, along the Mosquito Coast, in the Western Caribbean zone. Their population was estimated in 2025 as 543,775, with 461,000 living in Nicaragua.

The Miskito people speak the Miskito language and Miskito Coast Creole. Most also speak other languages, such as Spanish, English, and German. Spanish is the language of education and government, but some families educate their children in English, German, or Miskito. Miskito Coast Creole, an English-based creole language, came about through frequent contact with the British for trading, as they predominated along this coast from the 17th to the 19th centuries. Many Miskitos are Christians. A 1987 peace agreement afforded them land rights over traditional lands. However, despite significant political struggles throughout their history, today the Miskito face human rights violations over land rights disputes, as recognized by the Inter-American Commission for Human Rights.

== Etymology ==
"Miskito" derives from the term Miskut uplikanan ('people of Miskut'). Miskut was a legendary Miskito patriarch or great leader.

== Important Miskito communities ==
- Bluefields, Nicaragua
- Corn Islands, Nicaragua
- Gracias a Dios Department, Honduras
- North Caribbean Coast Autonomous Region, Nicaragua
- Cabo Gracias a Dios, Honduras
- South Caribbean Coast Autonomous Region, Nicaragua
- Puerto Cabezas, Nicaragua

== Miskito eras ==
- Pre-Monarchic (from the origin of Miskito people until the 16th century): the era of the Miskito Gods.
- Monarchic (16th–19th centuries): the era of the Miskito kings and European influence.
- Post-Monarchic (20th century): The end of the Miskito Kingdom, and invasion of the Miskito territories by Honduras and Nicaragua.
- Modern (21st century): the current Miskito Nation, on the Atlantic coast of Honduras and Nicaragua.

== History ==
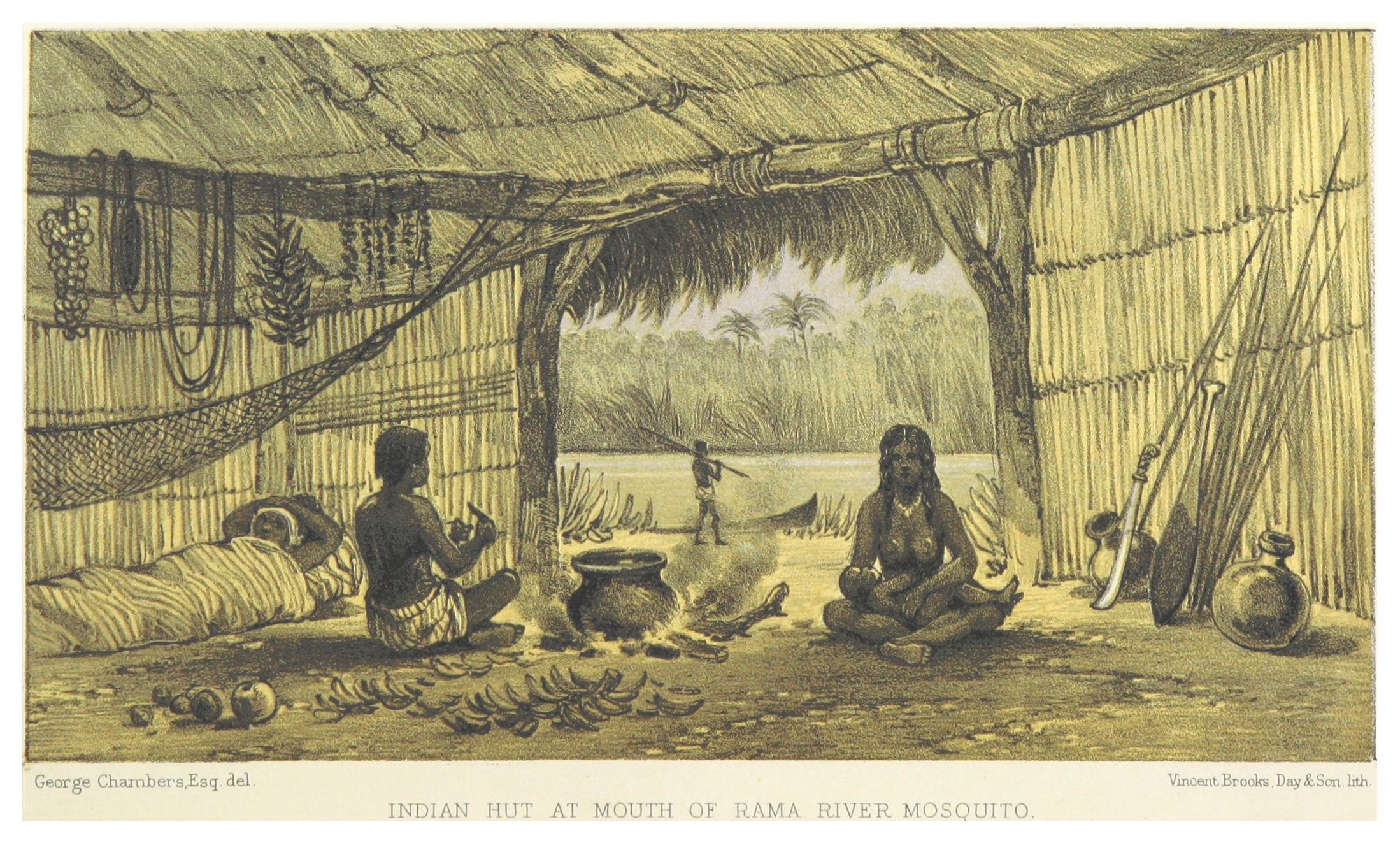
Miskito hut in Nicaragua

Before the arrival of Europeans in the region in the early 16th century, the area was divided into numerous small egalitarian native American groups speaking old Miskito language. The Spanish listed 30 nations in Taguzgalpa and Tologalpa, as the Spanish understood their geography. Karl Offen's analysis of this historic data suggests there were about a half dozen entities, groups who were distinct by their language dialects, who were situated in the river basins. Much of the Caribbean coast of Nicaragua and Honduras remained free from Spanish authority during the 16th century. The region became a haven for Dutch, English and Welsh privateers (for example Henry Morgan, Daniel Montbars and William Dampier) during the early 17th century.

Some African people arrived at the Mosquito Coast from wrecked slave ships in the mid-17th century. These people, along with escaped slaves from the Providence Island colony, settled around Cape Gracias a Dios and intermarried with the Indigenous people. The Spanish referred to these mixed-race descendants as "Mosquito Zambo" (Mosquito was their transliteration of Miskito). Those living in the southern (Nicaraguan) region were less racially mixed. Modern scholars have classified them as Tawira Miskito. Rivalries between these two groups and competition for territory often led to wars, which were divisive in the 18th century.

=== British-Miskito alliance ===
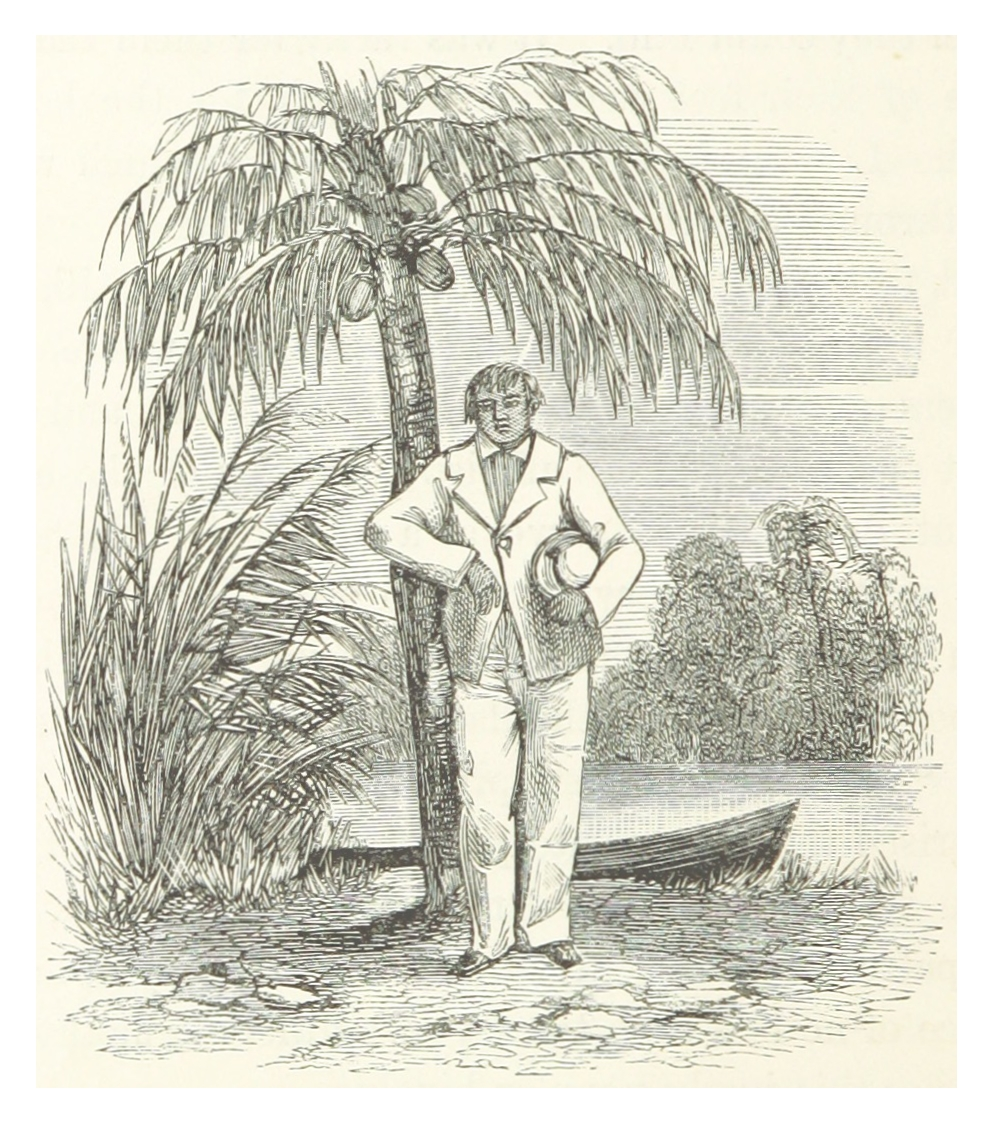
Drawing of a Miskito King (1869)

English privateers working through the Providence Island Company made informal alliances with the Miskito. These English began to crown Miskito leaders as kings (or chiefs); their territory was called the Miskito Kingdom (the English adopted the Spanish term for the Indigenous people). A 1699 written account of the kingdom described it as spread out in various communities along the coast but not including all the territory. It probably did not include the settlements of English traders. The king did not have total power. The 1699 description noted that the kings and governors had no power except in war time, even in matters of justice. Otherwise the people were all equal. Their superior leaders were named by the English as the king, a governor, a general and, by the 1750s, an admiral. Historical information on kings is often obscure as many of the kings were semi-mythical. These "kings" were not recognized by the Native American Tawira Miskito.

In the late seventeenth and early eighteenth centuries, Miskitos began a series of raids attacking Spanish-held territories and the still independent Indigenous groups in the area. Miskito raiders reached as far north as the Yucatán, and as far south as Costa Rica. Many of their captives were sold into slavery to European slave traders (even as the Zambo were originally slaves themselves), and many of them ended up working on Jamaican sugar plantations. In addition, from 1720 onwards, the Jamaican colonial authorities commissioned the Miskito to capture Maroons in the Blue Mountains, as they were effective trackers. The Zambos were one of the primary drivers of slave-based depopulation of the area.

The Zambo Miskito leader and the British concluded a formal Treaty of Friendship and Alliance in 1740. The British appointed John Hodgson as Superintendent of the Shore. The British established a protectorate over the Miskito Nation, often called the Mosquito Coast (related to the original Spanish name).

The Miskito kingdom aided Britain during the American War of Independence by attacking Spanish colonies to draw off their forces. It gained several victories alongside the British. But, at the conclusion of the peace in 1783, Britain had to cede control over the coast to Spain. The British withdrawal was completed at the end of June 1787. To compensate their Miskito supporters, the British re-settled 537 Zambo Africans often misnamed Miskitos, together with their 1,677 Native American slaves, from Mosquitia to the Bay settlement in British Honduras, present-day Belize. Despite their official withdrawal, Britain maintained an unofficial protectorate over the kingdom. They often intervened to protect Miskito interests against Spanish encroachments.

=== Independence era ===
In addition to the area's geographic isolation, the Miskito military capacity and British support allowed the people to retain their independence when Spain controlled the Pacific side of Central America. The Miskito Coast remained independent throughout much of the period of the Federal Republic of Central America, but Nicaragua finally absorbed the territory in 1894.

Once the Central American republics became independent in the early- to mid-19th century, they had less power in relation to other nations than did Spain, and struggled to protect their own territorial interests against filibusters and the United States government, which took an increasing strategic interest in the area.

The United Kingdom took an interest in the affairs on the Mosquito Coast, as it had trade positions in Belize/British Honduras and Jamaica. In addition, US trading interests began to develop in the region. British governors in Belize began issuing commissions and appointments to Miskito kings and other officials, such as King Robert Charles Frederick, crowned in Belize in 1825. British officials regularly officially recognized the various Miskito offices; it worked to protect Miskito interests against the Central American republics and against the United States.

The latter contested British influence as per the Monroe Doctrine. The United States involvement in war with Mexico prevented it from enforcing the doctrine. As Britain gradually became less interested in its commissioning of Miskito nobility, the Miskito effectively began to operate as an independent state. Due to British economic interest in Central America (particularly British Honduras, now Belize), they regularly traded with the Miskito.

After Nicaragua declared independence in 1821, combined Miskito-Zambo raiders began to attack Honduran settlements. They sometimes rescued enslaved Miskito before they could be transported beyond their reach. They also enslaved women from other tribes for use as sexual partners.

Their society allowed polygamy. The Miskito population boomed as the men had more children with their slave women. These raids continued for many years after animosity between Britain and Spain ended at the international level. For a long time, the Miskito considered themselves superior to other Indigenous tribes of the area, whom they referred to as "wild". The Miskito commonly adopted European dress and English names.

From the middle of the nineteenth century, British interest in the region began to wane. At the Treaty of Managua in 1860, the United Kingdom allowed Nicaragua to have uncontested claim over the Mosquito Coast. The treaty provided for a Miskito Reserve, a self-governing entity that enjoyed semi-sovereign rights. Nicaraguan forces occupied the area in 1894 and took over the state. The British restored the Miskito Reserve in July, but Nicaraguan forces reoccupied in August 1894 and ended its independence.

Various major American fruit companies (such as the United Fruit Company, which had begun large-scale production of bananas in the Miskito Reserve) supported Nicaragua's takeover of power in the area. The American companies preferred Nicaraguan authority to the Miskito, especially as the Miskito elite was more prepared to protect the rights of small landholders than was the Nicaragua government.

=== 20th century ===
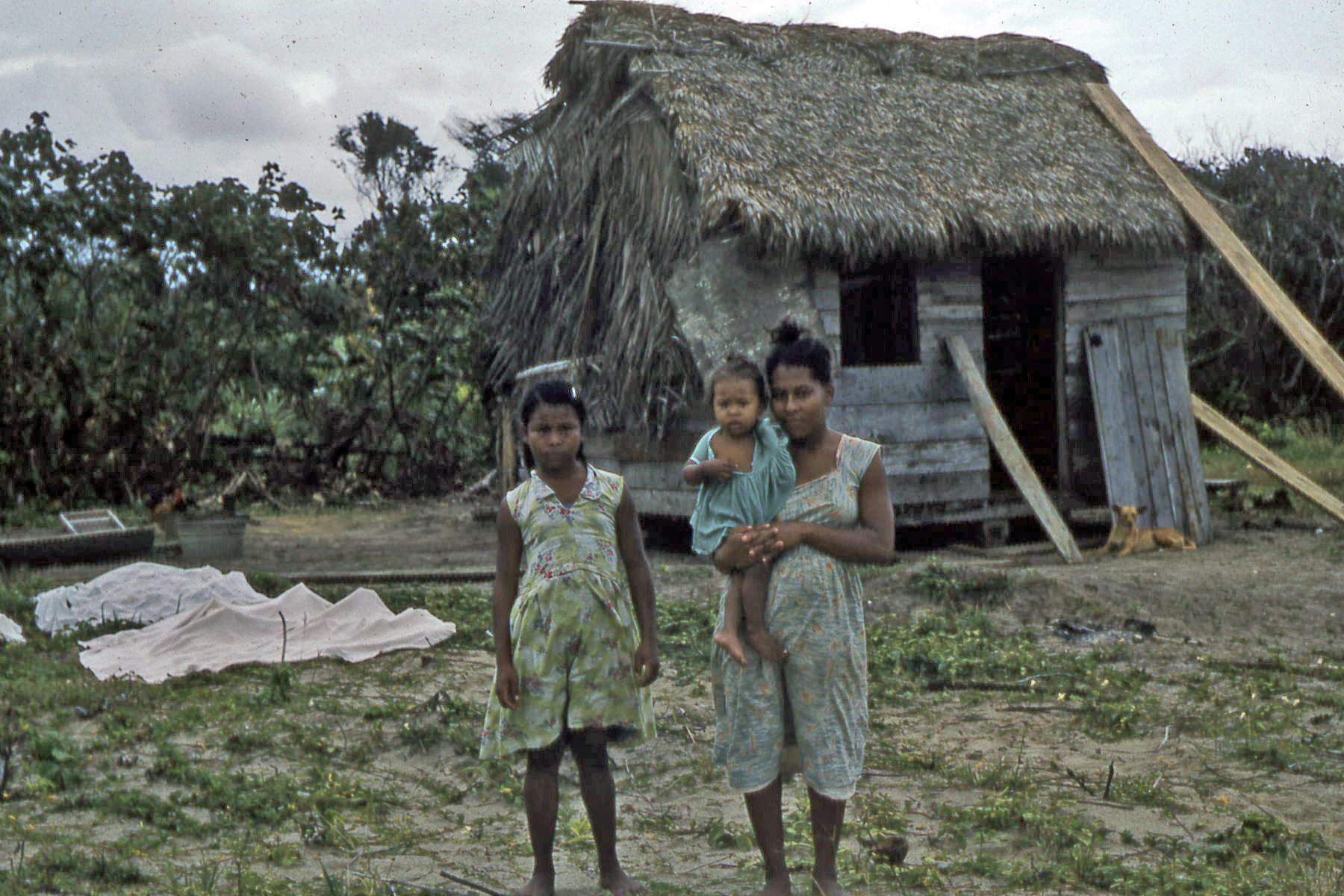
A family of Miskito people living along the Prinzapolka river in Nicaragua

==== Early 20th century ====
The Miskito who lived in the Jinotega Department, west of the North Caribbean Coast Autonomous Region, were much different from the Miskito who lived along the Caribbean coast. The Miskito in Jinotega were Catholic as a result of Spanish colonial influence, were not allied with the British, and often traded with the Spanish-speaking mestizos from the Pacific coast.

During the conflict in 1927–1933 between Augusto César Sandino and the United States over the United States occupation of Nicaragua, both sides tried to enlist the Miskito in providing food and transport. In 1926, many Miskito in the Jinotega region joined Augusto Sandino and his troops. The Miskito of Jinotega had closer ties with Sandino and the Sandinista National Liberation Front, which organized agricultural cooperatives and built schools and health centers in the area.

During the 1960s and the 1970s, Nicaragua began to expropriate native-held land for nationalization. During these decades, the mainstream of Nicaraguan national politics recognized the Miskito only when asking them to vote for the Nicaraguan National Liberal Party.

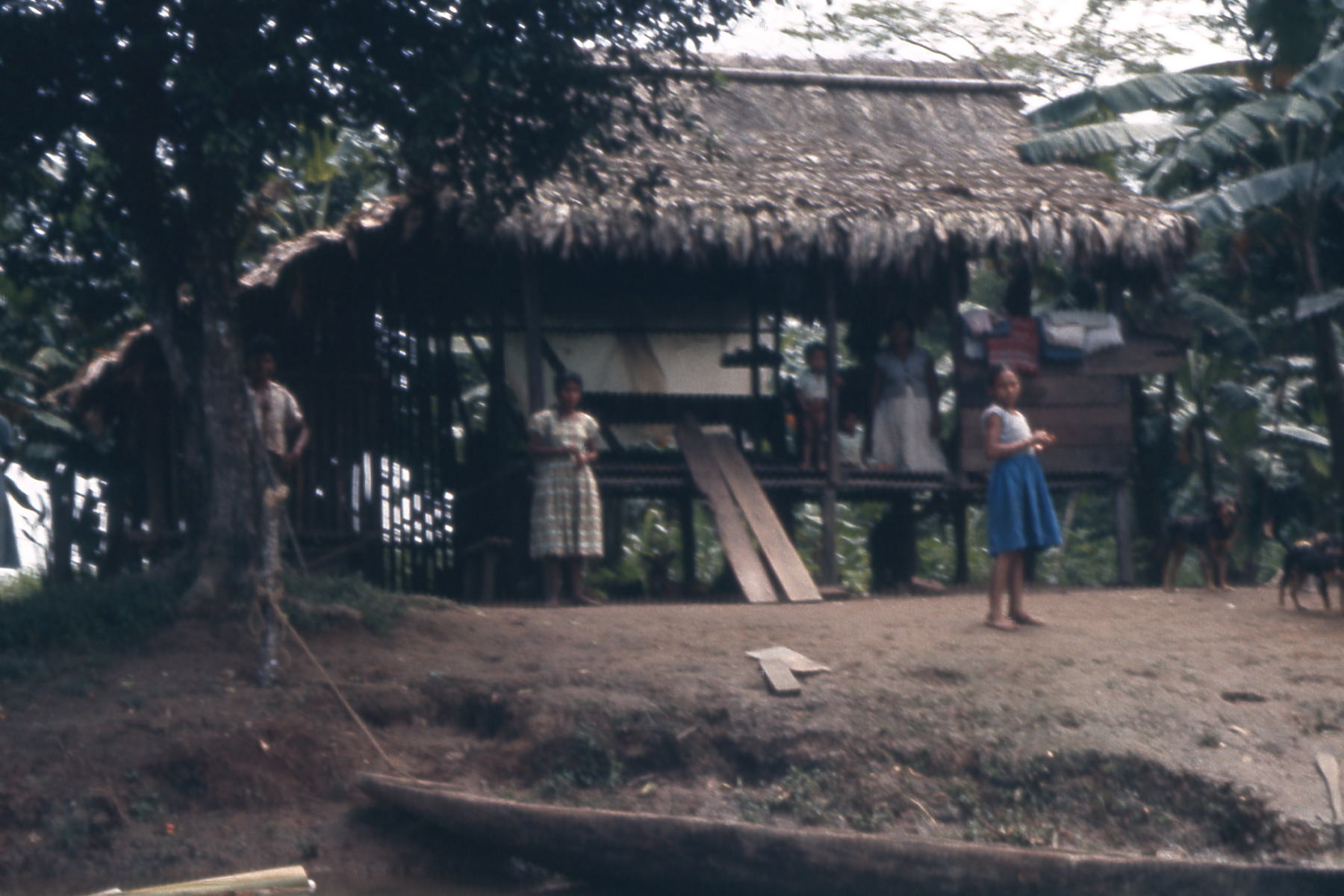
Miskito family outside their house in Nicaragua

==== Political conflict in the 1980s ====
In the 1980s, the Sandinista government extended their influence over the region via its Comités de Defensa Sandinista. In response, several Miskito groups formed counter-revolutionary squads, who carried on terrorist attacks against the revolutionary government. On 25 February 1982, Steadman Fagoth, one of the counter-revolutionary leaders, took refuge in Honduras along with 3000 Miskito. Meanwhile, the Sandinistas began to denounce the activities of the Contras in the Coco River zone. In 1983, the government proclaimed a state of emergency in the Río Coco zone, which was maintained until 1988.

A 1986 documentary called Nicaragua Was Our Home documented the persecution of the Miskito at the hands of the Nicaraguan government. The film features interviews with Miskito Indian people and some non-Miskito clergy who lived among them; they recounted actions of the government against them, including bombing of villages, shootings, and forced removal of people from their homes. The film was shown on some PBS stations and at the 1986 Sundance Film Festival.

In September 1987, the Nicaraguan legislature passed a statute providing autonomy to the Miskito. This essentially defused Miskito resistance.

==== 1990s ====
In 1990 the Sandinistas were defeated in national elections. The Miskito signed an agreement with the newly appointed Minister of the Interior, Carlos Hurtado, to create "security zones," prepare the return of the national police forces to the region, and integrate 50 Miskito into the police force.

Brooklyn Rivera, one of the Miskito guerrilla leaders, became the director of the INDERA (Nicaraguan Institute of Development of Autonomous Regions), an illegal structure under the 1987 law on autonomy. The government suppressed the INDERA a few years later, allegedly because of conflict between the Miskito and other native groups

=== 21st century ===
Despite the 1987 peace agreement affording the Miskito people substantial territory, conflict over land rights remains. Increasing waves of settlers have relocated to ancestral Miskito lands as a result of drought and attraction to gold and timber. Illegal purchases of Indigenous lands afforded the settling farmers void land rights. Violence between settlers and Miskito, Rama, and Ulwa people have led to the burning of villages, rape of women, kidnappings and the death of at least 30. Approximately 600 Indigenous people have fled to Honduras.

Both sides acknowledge that the Nicaraguan government has not worked to ameliorate this conflict. The Inter-American Commission for Human Rights repeatedly called for action in order to protect the Miskitos, to no governmental response. President Daniel Ortega has acknowledged that Miskito land claims are legitimate, and any land sales were not legal. The government arrested various public notaries for the authorization of illegal land sales, and created a special commission over the issue under the prosecutor general. However, the government has not addressed the violence. The public officials implicated in illegal land sales were Sandinistas, members of Ortega's own party.

==== Declaration of independence ====
In April 2009 a group of Miskito elders declared independence from Nicaragua under the name Community Nation of Moskitia. This declaration has not been met with any formal response from the government of Nicaragua nor has it been recognised by any other state. The independence movement is led by Hector Williams, who is described as the leader of the Miskito and uses the title Wihta Tara, or Great Judge. They cited as reasons for their renewed desire for independence the serious economic problems damaging their traditional fishing industry and the recent election of Daniel Ortega as president of Nicaragua. Many of them had fought as Contras against him during the Nicaraguan Civil War and still opposed him. Thus, many Miskito who supported the independence movement were those who had suffered greatly economically.

==== Impact of recent hurricanes ====
In 1998, Hurricane Mitch heavily damaged coastal regions where the Miskito live. On 4 September 2007, Category 5 Hurricane Felix with peak sustained winds of 160 mph struck the coast near Punta Gorda River, Nicaragua. Damage and death toll estimates are around 100 at this time but are likely to be higher.

Towards the end of the record-breaking 2020 Atlantic hurricane season, the Miskito Coast experienced the landfall of two major hurricanes within two weeks, breaking several Atlantic and Nicaraguan records. Slow-moving Hurricane Eta landed on November 3 just south of the region's major city Bilwi, and after one day turned west-northwest towards Honduras and then north back into the Caribbean. Hurricane Iota landed on November 16 only 25 km south of Eta's landing, and continued west through northern Nicaragua in the direction of El Salvador. Both hurricanes were strong Category 4s upon landfall.

== Classification ==
=== Applicability of the term "ethnic group" to Miskito people ===
Historically, the Miskito were not recognized as a singular "people" until their population grew in the area beyond being categorized as "sparsely populated".

=== Subgroups ===
As a result of the ethnic heterogeneity present in the Miskito people, various ethnic subgroups exist within the larger Miskito identity. A major ethnic distinction exists between the Miskitos; Mam, Tawira and Wangki. The Miskito Wangki constitute a large ethnic representation in the nation in the Cabo Gracias a Dios area. The Miskito Wangki would go on to form strong relationships with the British. The Wangki Miskito speak the Wanki Bila dialect of Miskito.

The Tawira Miskito, in contrast, have greater native ethnic representation and speak the Kabo Bila dialect of Miskito. According to Meringer, historical records reference the Tawira as "pure Indians". In order to counter their subjugation by the Zambo Miskito, the Tawira Miskito would seek out Spanish allies in the eighteenth century.

== Geography ==
=== Nicaragua ===
Prior to European contact, Miskitos were scattered along the Atlantic Coast of Nicaragua, inhabiting interior mountainous areas with numerous rivers and forests. The central point of Miskito territory is known as the Coco River or Wangks River, which also serves as a border between Nicaragua and Honduras.

Today, around 150,000 Miskito people live in Nicaragua. They are distributed among over 300 communities in 23 territories throughout Nicaragua’s Caribbean Lowlands and the Mosquito Coast. The town of Awastara is a major population centre and historical site for the Miskito people.

=== Honduras ===
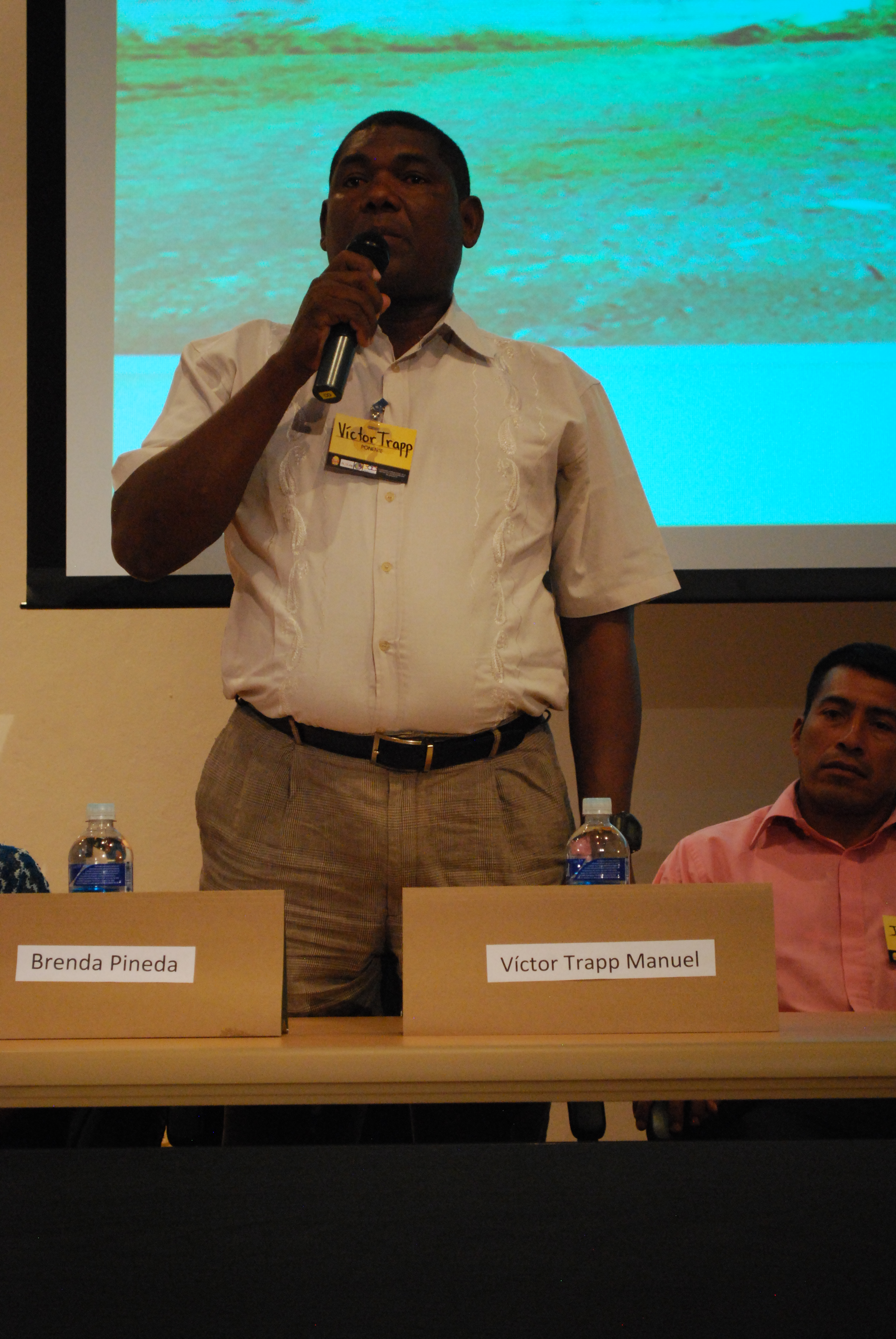
Victor Trapp Manuel represents the Misquito people in Honduras in a congress at the National Autonomous University of Honduras.

Prior to the 1859 Wyke-Cruz treaty with Britain, Miskito people inhabited the Cape of Gracias a Dios on the Caribbean coast and Honduran side of the Nicaragua-Honduras border. Despite the Wyke-Cruz treaty giving the Miskito authority over the land, it was ignored by the Honduran authorities. However, their autonomy has been preserved as a result of their geographic isolation. In 2013, the Honduran granted five Miskito communities land titles to their traditional land, totaling about 6,500 square kilometres (1.6 million acres). 100 villages exist in this area, containing a population of approximately 22,000.

== Culture ==
=== Language ===
The majority of Miskitos speak their native Miskito language. The Miskito language is a part of the Misumalpan language family. Some villages also speak Sumu, a closely related language within these ethnic groups. In addition, many Miskitos have adopted figures of speech from English and Spanish largely resulting from increased instances of bilingualism. The Caribbean areas of Jamaica, Belize, San Andrés, and Providence, Colombia share linguistic commonalities with the Miskito Coast population, likely stemming from the mixture of native languages, African languages, as well as colonial languages.

=== Religion ===
==== Miskito Gods ====
Miskito people were polytheist in the pre-monarchic era. However, there are no records of human sacrifices like the Maya or Incas. Their gods were Lapta (god of the sun), Kati (god of the moon), Slilma (god of the stars), Alwani (god of thunder), Imyula (god of lightning), Dusdawanka (god of trees and plants), Lidawanka (god of ocean, lakes and rivers), Rayakadawanka (god of living creatures), Sinslakadawanka (god of wisdom), Disangdawanka (god of fertility) Rakidawan (god of healing), Lasadawanka (god of dead souls) and Pruradawanka (god of death).

==== Shamanism ====
Prior to contact, Miskito people practiced a type of Shamanism where the shaman (known as Sukya) was seen as a healer by the community. The Sukya discovered cures by dreaming about them, and blowing smoke on the affected area. Group traditions included ritual dancing and drinking of a beverage known as mishla. Funeral traditions included a commemorative ceremony one year after death called Sikro. Only one leading shaman, known as Supreme Sukya or Okuli, could exist at a time and was revered by neighboring tribes as well. The Okuli exists as a representative to evil spirits, called Lasas. In the 1980s, shamans and group ceremonies took place in private.

==== Moravian Church ====
The Moravian Church attempted to proselytize the Miskito beginning in 1849, after attempting to provide a religious institution for a nearby German community which later failed. The Moravian Church represents a small branch of Protestantism that emphasizes community unity and simple living. By 1894, the Moravian Church had become a major interest group in the Atlantic coast area during the Nicaraguan reincorporation of the area through the establishment of missions. In the 20th century, the Moravian Church furthered its institutional presence through schools and production of religious materials and services in the Miskito native language. They did little to quell hostilities between the Miskito and Spanish Catholics. By the 1960s, the Moravian Church seemed to play a central role in Miskito communities for anthropologists studying the area.

==== Catholicism ====
Catholic converts existed in the Miskito region as early as the 1930s. Because of poor resources to send properly trained parsons and pastors, Miskito Catholics practice several "innovations" specific to the Miskito Coast. The lack of institutional Catholic presence led to many Moravian practices shared by Catholic leaders in the area. As a result, many Miskitos view differences in religions as institutionally based rather than theologically based. Churches in the area hold sanctity when occupied by the community, and are not revered as buildings in and of themselves. Further, Miskito experience divinity through dreams and discussions of good, bad, and human spirits. Shamans known as prapit or pasa yapti are the only individuals who physically experience divinity. Thus, Miskito Catholicism departs significantly from traditional Spaniard Catholicism as practiced by the majority of Nicaragua as it contains dimensions of a spiritual realm of divinity which humans can sometimes access.

=== Literature ===
The Miskito share folktales called kisi for entertainment. Kisi often include tales of a trickster rabbit named Tibang or Bangbang as well as kings, overall serving themes of authority and human nature and general. Some stories include myths of Duhindu, creatures similar to gnomes that sometimes kidnap children. According to researchers Ken Decker and Andy Keener, the Miskito share poems and stories, but do not have largely disseminated pieces of literature nor has anything been published. Media that appears in the area is largely in Spanish, with some programming in English and in regional languages.

=== Arts ===
The Miskito have musical traditions including round dances and traditional songs, as well as theatrical pieces including the symbol of the Miskito king. Regarding decorative arts, funeral ceremonies involve wooden masks.

== Institutions ==
=== Political structure ===
The Miskito political structure has been profoundly shaped via its interactions with other cultures including Hispanicized Nicaragua as well as the British, acting on their perception of colonial power dynamics at any given time.

==== English influence ====
Beginning with the English arrival in the geographical area, the Miskito kingdom and political structure as a whole reflected the English political structure. The Miskito-English political dynamics would change with time but the two entities would remain operating in conjunction for approximately 250 years. Miskito kings were crowned by some of the first English settlers. Those recognized as kings by the British maintained the political structure as contact between mainland British and Miskitos increased.

Officially, the British government claimed political oversight of Miskito territory from 1740 to 1786—however, the British colonists inhabiting Miskito territory maintained the power dynamics established by the government even after their official evacuation. From 1860 to 1894, the Miskito Reserve period maintained centralized rule under a pro-British Miskito chief. Importantly, the Nicaraguan government recognized this leader as Hereditary Chief but granted him authority over land separate from Miskito-inhabited land. Thus, through the Miskito Reserve the Miskito people were granted autonomy" but remained under the influence of a British political system through the designated chief.

The British ultimately largely failed in attempts to create fully functioning centralized political structures for the Miskito largely as a result of the heterogeneity within the Miskito population. However, their establishment of a singular political leader did allow that individual to gain favor with the British and allow for continued contact between the two societies.

==== 18th century self-rule in the Miskito kingdom ====
Despite the presence of the British political ideology of centralized power, the political structure in the Miskito kingdom proved more tribal in nature. Late seventeenth century accounts of the Miskito describe them as an "egalitarian society" that was "sparsely populated." As the Miskito population grew over time, the political structure effectively transformed into autonomous regional chiefdoms with vaguely defined social classes. Leaders at the time would rule over a given number of villages, with their political power bound to their recognized villages. This structure served to limit any single Miskito king's power over the Miskito as a whole, instead playing up the Miskito king's role in interacting with the British.

==== Re-incorporation in the nineteenth century ====
According to Meringer, Miskito people enjoyed peak levels of autonomy in the nineteenth century after British colonists were forced out of the Mosquito Coast. The Miskito people themselves rose to power in the absence of the British, enjoying ethnic preeminence and little to no threats to their power. However, as the Honduran government began to become increasingly assertive in the region, the Miskito lost much of their officially recognized political power to African Creoles on representative governmental bodies. The Creoles would grow increasingly in power, overcoming the Miskito chief, and politically and culturally isolating the chief from the Miskito people at large. By the time of Re-incorporation, Miskito autonomy had already been threatened and substantially deconstructed by increases in Creole power.

Thus, during Re-incorporation, Nicaraguan government officials targeted Creole rulers rather than Miskito Indians. Later, Miskito took this opportunity to further Miskito autonomy and political authority in the region through a Decree of Re-incorporation which allowed representatives from the Miskito community to freely adhere to Nicaraguan laws and authorities while also granting Miskito people self-governance rights at the village level among other rights. This decree allowed previously marginalized Miskito to reclaim rights denied them by the ascendance of Creole elites earlier in the nineteenth century and allowed the population to unify.

==== Twentieth century mobilization ====
In response to the indigenismo policies adopted throughout Latin America in the twentieth century, the Miskito people organized through activism to advocate for policies promoting political, social, and cultural assimilation. Specifically for the Miskito people, the activism in response to indigenismo policies encompassed a movement promoting integration and civil rights. Prior to the notable activist movements of the 1980s, the Miskito prioritized integration into state political structures and civil rights under the liberal Nicaraguan constitution. The movements of the 1960s and 1970s proved largely integrationist and was led by completely separate leaders than those after the Sandinista Revolution.

As early as the 1950s, Miskitos worked to confront the large and small injustices their community faced. By integrating into the Nicaraguan state via land titles, the Miskito were able to participate in the larger economy of the country and hold the state accountable to their local interests. This larger political participation fed into the Miskito locales, affording local representatives more power regarding territorial disputes in general, allowing for increased political involvement from Miskitos not directly tied to political processes.

Regarding indigenismo, Nicaraguan officials viewed these policies as an opportunity to become more involved with the Mosquito Coast, which had previously been largely left alone. Miskito people were able to claim benefits at a larger governmental level that previously did not exist including technical training in medicine and agriculture, as well as increased access to education and more schoolhouses. For the Miskito in Nicaragua, indigenismo represented an opportunity to increase rapport with the government and greater access to previously inaccessible state resources rather than an affront to ethnic identity.

=== Gender relations ===
The Miskito people have maintained the same cultural traits that they acquired during the pre-colonial and colonial era. Contact with the English has created the position of a king who is seen as the figurehead of the tribes; however, the modern king has little power and generally does not affect the different tribes.

The gender roles within the Miskito culture are affected more by the "boom and bust" of the local economy than by any ruler. When there are few job opportunities men rely on agricultural work and they spend time within their respective communities. There is evidence that the society followed a patriarchal setup during these "bust" times; however, when the economy is "booming", men generally get jobs that force them to travel. Since the 1990s men have been traveling as a result of an increase in job opportunities, and they spend significant amounts of time away from their villages.

Most men work on fishing boats diving for lobsters. Since men spend eight months out of the year away from their families, communities have a matrilocal arrangement. Typically men over age 13 are rarely present during daily life in a village.

Men are considered the breadwinners of a household and contribute the majority of a family’s income, but women have the ability to make all economic decisions. Some women do housekeeping or sell small crafts to make extra money, but it is not enough by itself to support a family. Girls inherit the right to settle on their mother’s land, and although men clear farmland, women have full ownership of it.

It is extremely difficult for women to find jobs, and most rely on men and their incomes to support their children. Many women practice magia amorosa (love magic), and they believe that it helps attract men and their money. This love magic can also be used to help save one’s marriage. Women have the greatest input in how their households are run, but they are unable to do anything without the money that their husbands provide. Love magic highlights the importance of keeping a man interested within Miskito society.

Women usually begin forming relationships at age 15, and most become mothers by 18. Most women have six to eight children with their husband, but since men are not around that often there are high abandonment and divorce rates. Men often feel no moral obligation to take care of children because of a high illegitimacy rate. Abandoned children are generally adopted by women within the child's matrilocal group and taken care of by an aunt or grandmother. As women become older they also gain status within their community. In each society women who are respected elders, kukas, are considered local experts and enforcers of correct behavior in their village.

=== Economy ===
==== Pre-contact subsistence economy ====
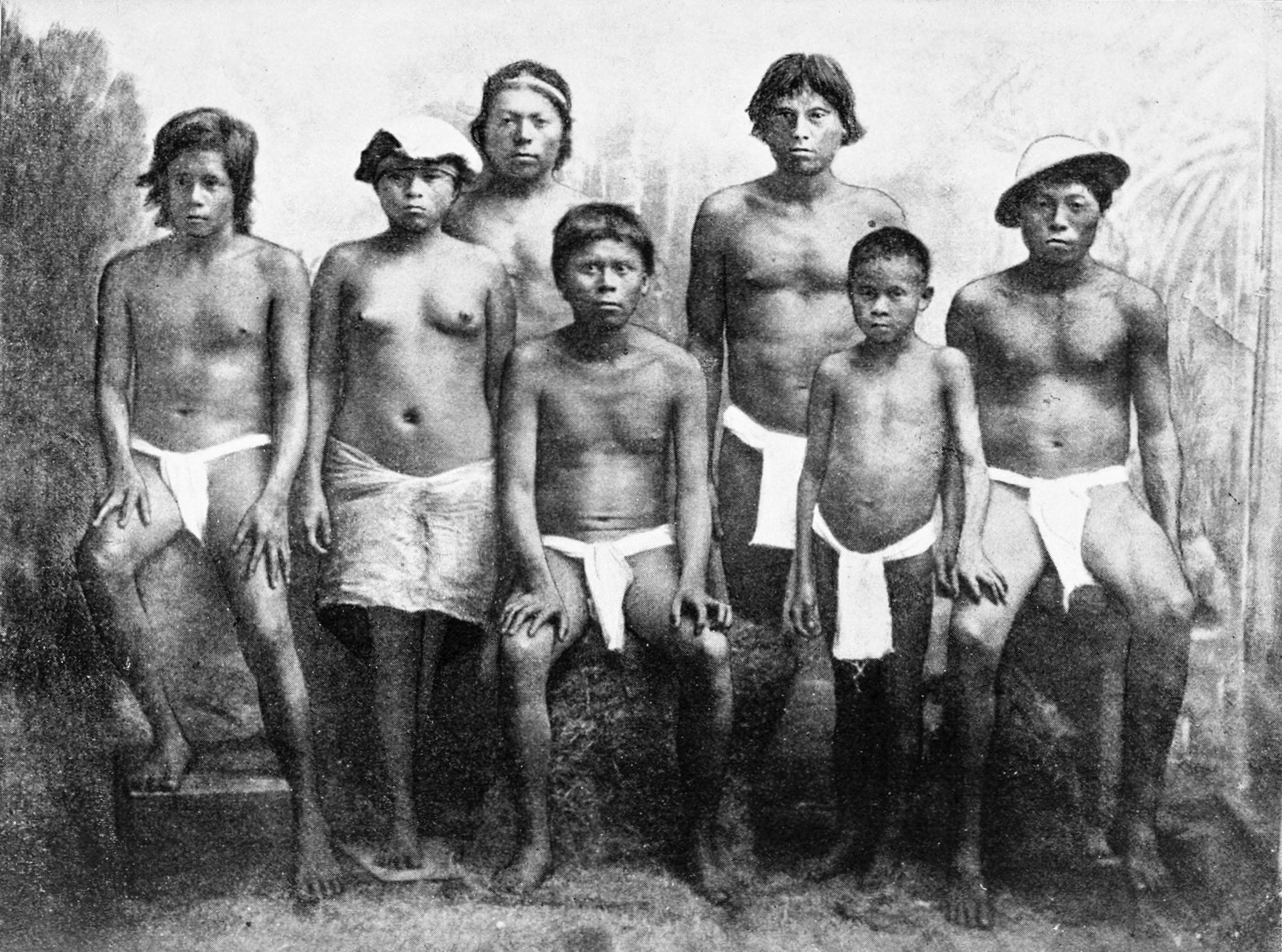
1894 photograph of a group of Miskito people

Miskito oral tradition states that many centuries ago a tribe emigrated from northern South America and settled on the coast at a site called Sitawala – possibly near present-day Cabo Gracias a Dios. They were led by a warrior chief named Miskut, and called themselves the Miskut uplika nani (people of Miskut). The tradition states that neighboring tribes found it difficult to pronounce this name, and so shortened it to Miskito. After the death of Miskut, the tribe divided into three groups. One group ascended the Río Coco and became known as the river people. The other two groups moved north and south into present day Honduras and around present day Sandy Bay, Nicaragua. These people became known as the beach people.

The earliest European accounts of the Miskito are from Puritan colonists in 1633 and English and French buccaneers during the late 1600s-early 1700s. These early accounts claim that Miskito tribes ranged along the Caribbean coast from the Wawa River, south of present-day Puerto Cabezas, Nicaragua, to Cabo Camarón, Honduras. These early colonists, explorers and buccaneers described the Miskito as skilled maritime people adept a seafaring, fishing, and the hunting of turtle, manatee, as well as land animals such as deer.

Work conducted around Pearl Lagoon in Nicaragua by archaeologist Richard W. Magnus suggests that pre-contact coastal settlements were most likely temporary shellfish collection and salt manufacturing stations. Metates and other agricultural tools have been found in these coastal sites, however there is little evidence of permanent settlement, in-situ agriculture, nor specialized tools that would suggest adaptation to the marine environment. Furthermore, the lowland coastal soils are of poor agricultural quality and likely would not have supported permanent settlements. According to Magnus and others working in Honduran sites on the Río Tinto, these peoples were most likely riparian in nature. Archaeological sites inland show more signs of permanent settlement including house sites, animal/fish bones, hearths, and agricultural plots. It is suggested that these riverine people traveled temporarily to the coast to make salt and subsidize their agricultural diet with shellfish, but that their overall orientation was inland and not coastal . Despite a dearth of contact era reports, this theory of seasonal coastal migration is supported by the English buccaneer "M.W." in 1732 who observed inland tribes who seasonally arrived at the coast to make salt before travelling back up river. Anthropologist Mary W. Helms and Geographer Bernard Nietschmann argue that the coastal orientation of the modern Miskito was precipitated by contact and subsequent social, economic and political involvement with Great Britain.

==== Post-contact mixed economy ====
===== Early trade and English buccaneers =====
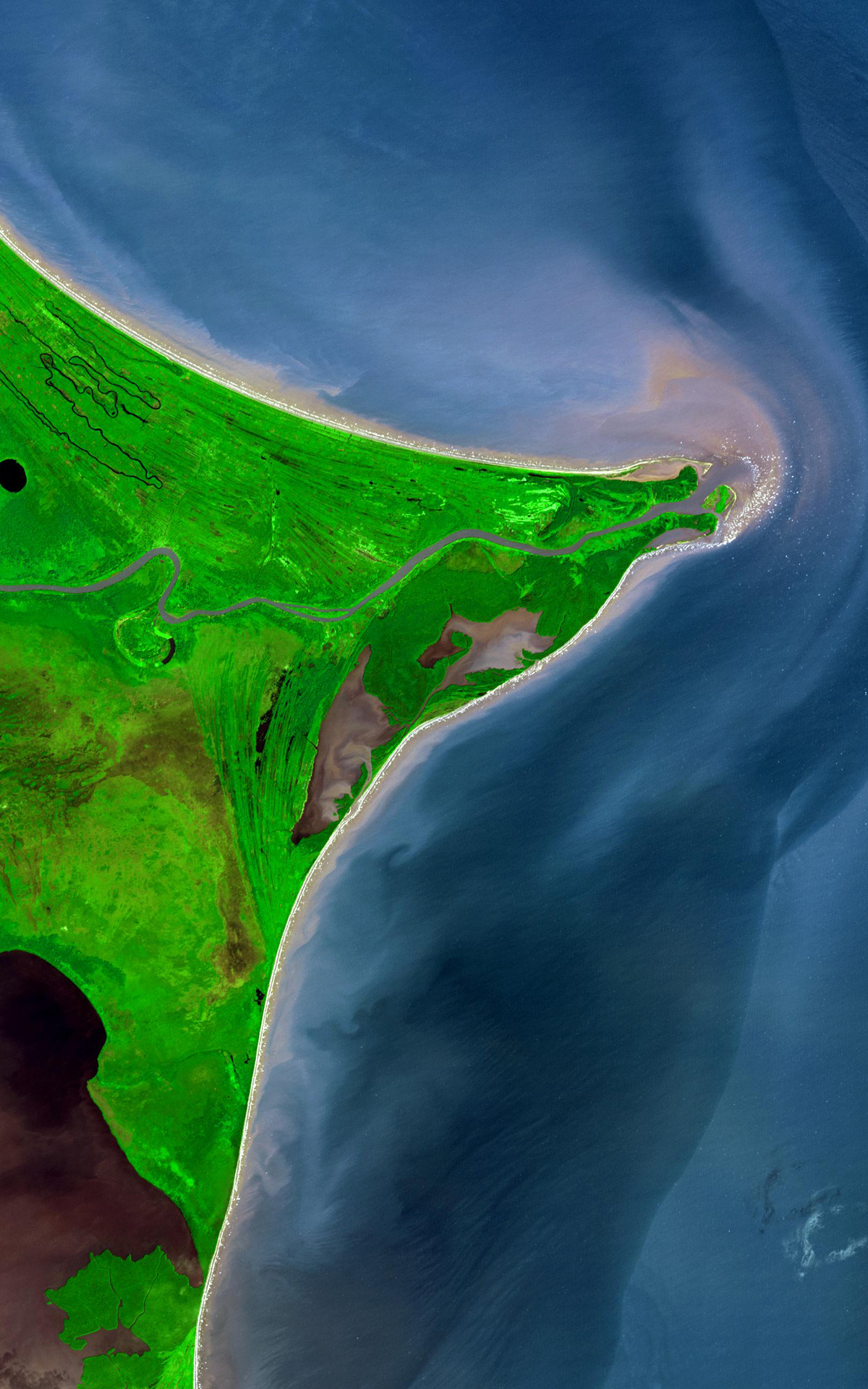
Cabo Gracias a Dios and the estuary of the Río Coco

The colony of Providence Island was established off the coast on present day Nicaragua by the English Providence Island Company in 1630, which precipitated the formation of settlements around 1633 on the Miskito Coast at Cabo Gracias a Dios, and further south at present day Bluefields, Nicaragua. The first known proto-Miskito contact with the English occurred around 1634 at the Cabo trading post.

The English regularly traded with the proto-Miskito for turtle shells, meat, lumber, hides, and other items in return, for beads, rum, clothing, food, livestock, and firearms. Many of these items were acquired by the coastal tribes through barter with inland tribes. As time passed, the proto-Miskito, in contrast to the inland peoples, mixed openly with the English and adopted some of their cultural traits, incorporating English words into their vocabulary and adopting European tools, food, clothing, and firearms – becoming the contact culture known today as the Miskito.

In addition to periodic trade, the Miskito were involved with English buccaneers of the 17th century. The buccaneers adopted Miskito communities as their bases and employed the Miskito in their cause. The buccaneers regularly employed local Miskito men to accompany them on their voyages as fishermen, hunters, navigators, and fighters. Through these experiences, the Miskito became adept raiders and raiding became a part of their local economy. With the support of the English and modern firearms, the Miskito expanded out of their cultural hearth near Cabo Gracias a Dios, and settled widely along the Miskito Coast. Following the decline of buccaneering at the end of the 17th century, many of the buccaneers turned to more legal ways of making money including cash crop production, and contraband. Sugar, Dye wood and contraband made up the majority of the local economy and wage labor became more common.

===== Balancing commercial and subsistence activities =====
The Miskito culture and economy is a product of intermixing between coastal Indigenous tribes, European buccaneers, traders, and settlers and escaped slaves. The Mosquito Coast, since colonial times, has been an economic frontier characterized by barter and boom/bust economies where markets develop to exploit specific resources, such as turtles, precious lumber, rubber, bananas, and logwood and collapse when the world market busts leaving little long-term development. As such, there has always been a commercial component to the economy, however, due to the inevitability of economic busts and their isolation from national powers, the Miskito have maintained their subsistence culture without being absorbed into the full-time market economy – what anthropologist Mary Helms refers to as a ‘purchase society’. A purchase society is a power dynamic in which the Indigenous are not subjugated as peasants, but still interact with a merchant or elite class via trade – retaining their autonomy and identity.

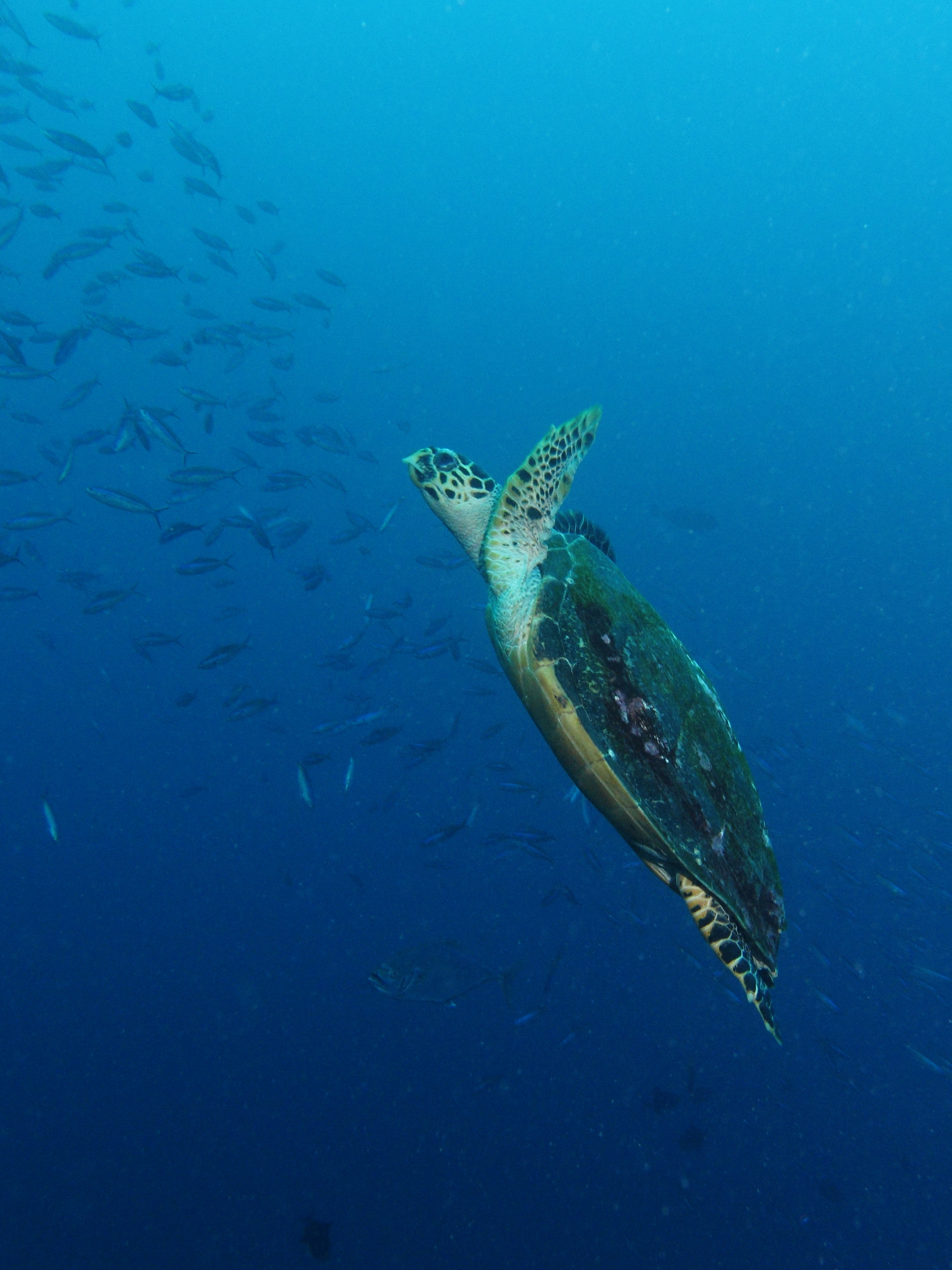
Green sea turtle

The Miskito subsistence economy was based primarily on hunting, fishing, and some limited agriculture and silviculture. The nature of the economy was one of subsistence and reciprocity. Subsistence activities were traditionally divided by gender. Women tended to the agriculture, while the men cleared land, hunted, fished, and worked in wage labor when it was available. As Geographer Bernard Nietschmann highlights, there was a complex system of meat reciprocity which served as a sort of social security system for the society. If a hunter or fisherman was successful, they would gift some of the catch to their extended family and 'sell' it to their friends with the expectation that the favor would be returned. Traditionally, there was a balance between subsistence and commercial activities. When commercial goods were in demand Miskito labor shifted towards commercial activities and subsistence activities were neglected. Upon the decline of the commercial activities, the Miskito fell back on their subsistence skills. However, the rise of the company economy precipitated a fundamental shift in the Miskito economy away from these short term/seasonal economic relationships to more regular long-term employment of contract wage labor and exploitation of communal resources for commercial gain. A major challenge to the Miskito system of meat reciprocity was the commercialization of the green sea turtle, a staple of the Miskito diet.

The Miskito have hunted green turtles as part of their traditional subsistence economy since at least the contact era. Much of the Miskito subsistence system, and settlement patterns were based around the seasonal appearance of the green sea turtle. In the 17th century, the buccaneer William Dampier wrote that the Moskito Indians were "esteemed and coveted by all privateers" because of their skill at hunting turtle and manatee, "for one or two of them [the animals] in a ship will maintain 100 men". The traditional method of capture was the harpoon. The harpoon was eight to ten feet in length and attached to a strong line. the turtle hunters traveled in small, seagoing canoes, using complex mental maps and systems of navigation to locate the turtles. A hunting party consisted of two men: a "strikerman" in the bow, and the "captain" in the stern. The hunters intercepted the turtles in the area between their sleeping shoals and feeding banks as they surfaced for air. After being harpooned, the turtle was capable of pulling a canoe along at high speeds until eventually tiring. The hunters could then pull the turtle alongside the canoe and kill it. Once killed, the turtle was returned to the community where the meat was divided among family and friends.

In general, no more turtles were hunted than could satisfy the community's meat needs. However, increased demand from international markets during the 17th, 18th, and 19th centuries led to changes in hunting methods. The activities became market-focused instead of subsistence-focused. Foreign companies established commercial enterprises and hired Miskito turtlemen to facilitate intensive harvesting of green turtles to support sugar plantation labor, but also European palates. Exploitation was so intense that sea turtle populations in the greater Caribbean basin had been decimated by the mid-1800s, and villagers were confronted with rising social tensions due to increased dependence on a scarce resource. In the present day, sea turtle populations have recovered to a point, but the Miskito now balance a desire for turtle products with the forces of local, national, and international conservation goals.

===== The company period =====
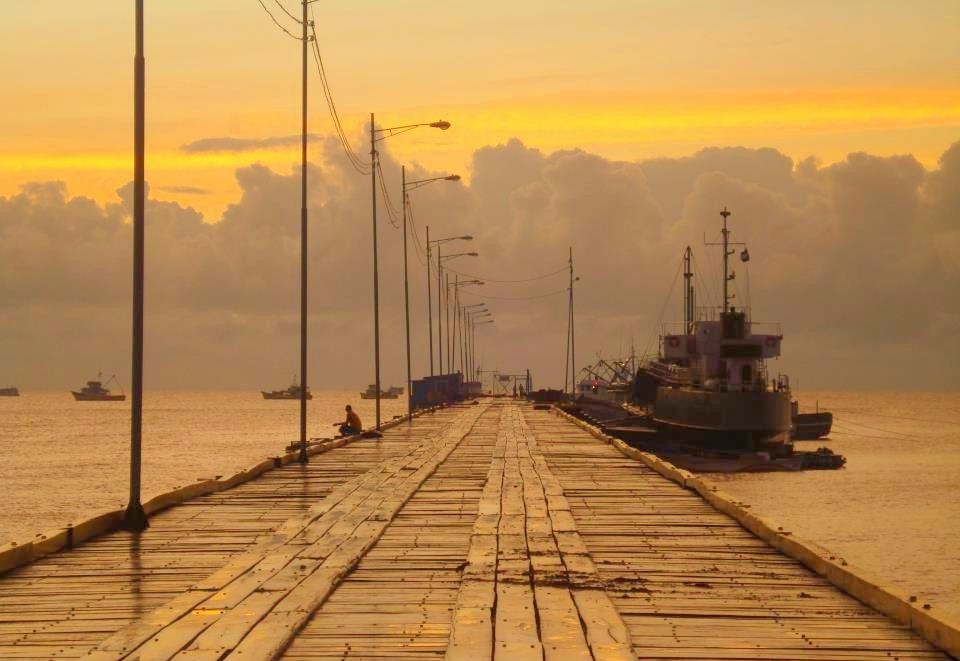
The Bilwi pier was originally constructed by the Bragman's Bluff Company to facilitate shipment of lumber and bananas.

The establishment of European control, and later American hegemony on the Miskito Coast opened up the region for foreign business interests and the introduction of wage labor. The period between the turn of the 20th century and the 1960s became known as the company period, and was defined by large foreign enterprises, company run communities, and wage labor in the extraction of natural resources. During this time, lumbering of mahogany and other valuable trees, cash cropping of sugar and other products, which had existed in reduced form since the 17th century, expanded into large commercial enterprises. In terms of lumber, companies hired Miskito men to find, cut, and deliver desirable trees or tree products to the coast where they were then exported to Europe or the United States. By the end of the 1800s, lumber and rubber were major employers of male Miskito labor and foreign investment was high. The effects of this influx of money could be seen in the Miskito community of Puerto Cabezas.

Prior to 1921, the community of Puerto Cabezas (Bilwi), Nicaragua, was little more than a small fishing village, but starting in this year a consortium of business from the United States, including the Bragman’s Bluff Lumber and Fruit Company, and Standard Fruit began developing the community into their base of operation and main export port. The companies together outfitted the community with a lumber mill, pier and port facilities, and a regional railroad system for the extraction of lumber and bananas. By 1926 Bragman’s Bluff Lumber was the largest employer in Nicaragua, with over 2000 workers. Pine lumbering persisted with periodic booms and busts through the 1960s. Bragman’s Lumber recorded its largest shipment of lumber at Puerto Cabezas in 1960 with just over 28.4 million linear board feet.

The other major boom market for this period was in bananas. The banana boom, with its plantation employment, lasted from the 1890s −1930s – peaking in the 1931. At the port of Puerto Cabezas, Standard Fruit recorded it all-time high production of 6.1 million racimos (clusters) in 1931. As a result of economic depression in the United States, and a soil fungus outbreak, the banana economy quickly busted. By the end of World War II exports at Puerto Cabezas were down to 99,685 racimos and by 1960 the number was down to 9,753. Gold-mining and pine lumbering also began in the late 1800s and persisted with periodic booms and busts through the 1960s. Seafood, including shrimp and lobster, has been the most recent boom market in the region since the 1970s.

Overall, the company period was known for its boom and bust economies. Massive hirings during economic upswings were followed by massive layoffs. During boom times, skilled and unskilled workers would flood into town, only to return to their homes after the price of lumber, bananas, or ores dropped leaving ghost towns, and abandoned infrastructure. During the company period, it was common for the Miskito men to leave their communities and families for up to a year at a time, to work in the various industries. They would send back money as replacement for the subsistence goods that they would have traditionally produced. Without their husbands and male family members, the women were increasingly forced to purchase food (especially meat) on the cash market and hire farm hands to clear and tend agricultural plots. This employment dynamic led to the large-scale introduction of the money-based economy, and the replacement of subsistence goods with relatively inexpensive commissary goods. This shift created a dependency on commercial goods and cash earning employment.

===== The lobster economy and controversy =====
====== The industry ======
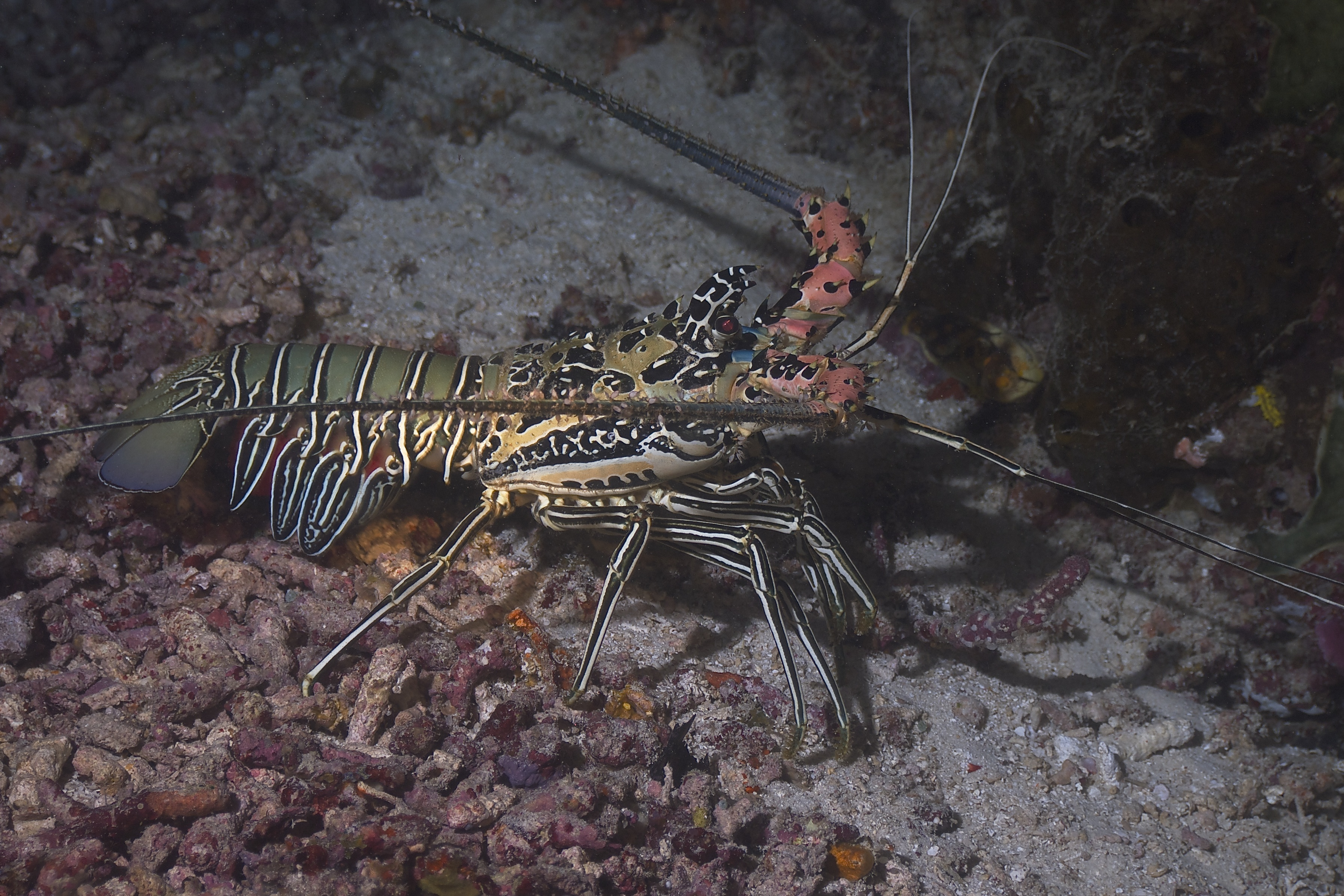
Spiny Lobster

Increasing demand in the United States led to a boom in commercial exploitation of spiny lobster along the Mosquito Coast beginning in the 1970s. Lobster, like products of past booms, has become a major source of cash income for the Miskito and the great majority of the population either directly or indirectly depends on lobster income. In 2011, the industry employed around 3500 people on 44 boats in Honduras alone. In Nicaragua, it has been estimated that commercial lobster diving employs over 5,000 people and affects the livelihoods of 50,000 men, women and children. Many of these people work as divers, using scuba equipment to dive and catch lobster.

The vast majority of fishing operations are controlled by ladino boat owners based in the Bay Islands of Honduras and Puerto Cabezas, Nicaragua. These owners employ local recruiters or sacabuzos in coastal communities to organize crews of dive teams, as well as other boat hands. A dive team consists of a diver and cayuquero; a diver apprentices who follows the diver in a canoe allowing the diver to offload his catch. In addition to 18–20 dive teams, a boat employs additional support staff to cook, clean, and manage the diving equipment.

At the beginning of a fishing trip, the lobster boats travel the coast picking up recruited dive teams and boat hands. They then search for lobster at known lobster banks between Honduras and Colombia, often illegally and usually over the course of 12–16 days. The divers are paid by the pound for lobster tails alone. In the early days of the boom, lobster tails of 1–2 pound were common whereas by the early 1990s a diver needed 2–3 lobsters to make the same weight. At that time, the average diver brought in, per trip, 150–180 pounds of lobster. By 2011 the estimated average was down to 74 pounds/trip. Following the catch, the boats return the crew members to their communities, and the catch is processed in the Bay Islands or Puerto Cabezas before being shipped to primarily the United States.

====== Controversy ======
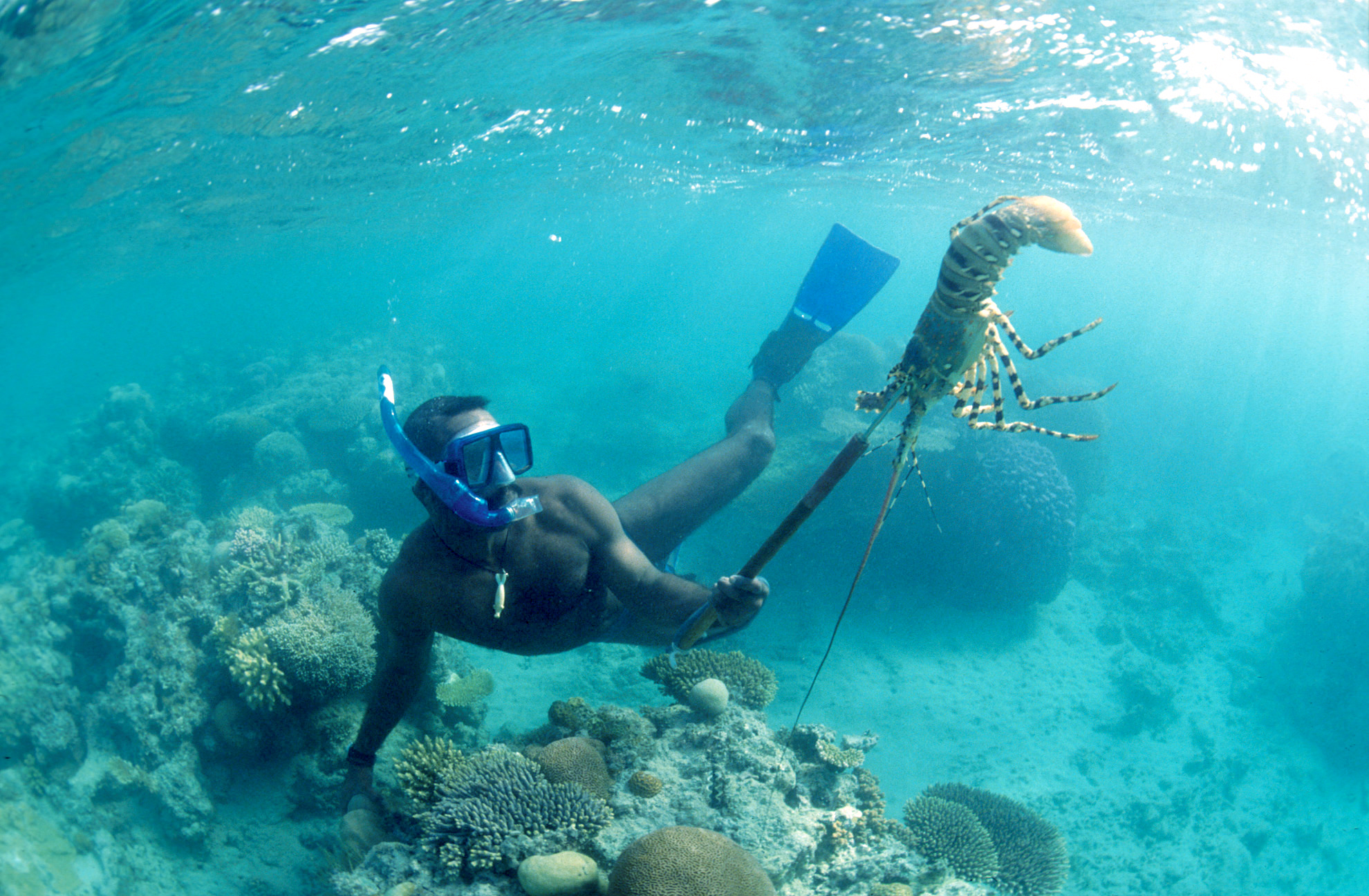
Free-diving lobster diver

Since the 1960s, the Miskito have used free-diving techniques to harvest lobsters as their primary source of income. In the early years of the lobster boom, large and plentiful lobster were found close to shore in shallow waters, and could be accessed easily by free-diving. Lobster production peaked, however, around 1985, and these resources were quickly depleted. Scuba diving techniques were introduced around 1980 to enable the Miskito to expand their area for harvesting into deeper waters. Declining returns have forced divers to dive more often, deeper, and for longer, using pressurized tanks to maintain their income. In response to declining lobster populations, the governments of Honduras and Nicaragua implemented a fishing season – restricting lobster exploitation to between 1 March and 30 July. The goal was to reduce pressure on lobster populations, but the result has also increased pressure on lobster divers. It is not uncommon for divers to make 12–16 dives per day to depths of 100–120 ft. in an effort to maintain their incomes. The result has been an increase in the number of cases of decompression sickness and decompression related deaths. Around 2013, Honduras had the highest number of decompression related deaths and sickness in the world. Estimates at that time put the number of injured somewhere over 2000, while over 300 others have died since the 1970s. The divers almost universally lack formal dive training, and the push to maintain their incomes leads divers to dive too much and stay down too long. In response to activist outcries, several large lobster importers in the United States announced in 2015 that they will no longer purchase dive caught lobster, however, similar efforts by Red Lobster in 1993 failed to disrupt the industry. In 2009 both Honduras and Nicaragua agreed on regional regulations to prohibit lobster diving. Regional agreement OSP-02-2009 – Reglamento para el Ordenamiento Regional de la Pesquería de Langonsta del Caribe was signed by the nations of Central America on 21 May 2009 and was to prohibit tank assisted lobster diving within two years. These regulations, however, have not been enforced, partly because of political pressure from the fishing industry and a lack of viable economic alternatives in on the Miskito Coast. In a 2011 census of Honduran lobster divers, 36% of injured divers continued to dive after their first accident and 50% of divers had considered quitting due to the risks, but continued, because of the lack of viable economic alternatives.

The 2012 documentary film My Village, My Lobster examines the individuals and communities involved in this fishing industry. The film features testimony from divers who have been injured, boat owners and captains who are responsible for the divers' safety, and a hyperbaric medicine specialist who treats injured divers. The film includes footage from aboard a commercial lobster diving vessel and from the remote Miskito Keys (or Miskito Cays), the noted turtle-hunting grounds of the Miskito.

== Notable people ==
=== Miskito Kings ===
- c. 1650–c. 1687 Oldman
- c. 1687–1718 Jeremy I
- c. 1718–1729 Jeremy II
- 1729–1755 Edward of Mosquitia
- 1755–1776 George I
- 1776–1800 George II
- 1800–1824 H.M. George Frederic (crowned in 1816)
- 1825–1842 H.M. Robert Charles Frederic
- 1842–1864 H.M. George Augustus Frederic
- 1865–1879 H.E. William Henry Clarence, Hereditary Chief of Miskitu (from 1860 suzerainty of the area of Mosquito Kingdom was transferred to Nicaragua with the name 'Mosquito Reserve')
- 1879–1888 H.E. George William Albert Hendy, Hereditary Chief of Miskitu
- 1888–1889 H.E. Andrew Hendy, Hereditary Chief of Miskitu
- 1889–1890 H.E. Jonathan Charles Frederick, Hereditary Chief of Miskitu
- 1891–1908 H.E. Robert Henry Clarence, Hereditary Chief of Miskitu and last sovereign leader of the autonomous Mosquito Reserve

=== Other notable people ===
- Lottie Cunningham Wren (born 1959), lawyer, environmentalist and Native American rights activist from Nicaragua
- Myrna Cunningham, politician
- Rudel Calero, footballer

== See also ==
- Grisi siknis
- KISAN
- La Mosquitia (Honduras)

== Bibliography ==
- Cwik Christian, "The Africanization of Amerindians in the Greater Caribbean: The Wayuu and Miskito, Fifteenth to Eighteenth Centuries". In: Franklin Knight and Ruth Iyob (eds.), Dimensions of Diaspora. (Kingston: University of the West Indies Press, 2014) 298–329.
- Dennis, Philip A.; Olien, Michael D. (1984). "Kingship among the Miskito". American Ethnologist. 11 (4): 718–737. doi:10.1525/ae.1984.11.4.02a00060.
- Herlihy, Laura Hobson (2007). "Matrifocality and Women's Power on the Miskito Coast". Ethnology. 46 (2): 133–149.
- Herlihy, Laura Hobson (2006). "Sexual Magic and Money: Miskitu women's Strategies in Northern Honduras". Ethnology. 46 (2): 143–159.
- Merrill, Tim L., ed. Honduras: a country study. 3rd ed., 1995.
