= Erick Blandón =

Nicaraguan writer (born 1951)

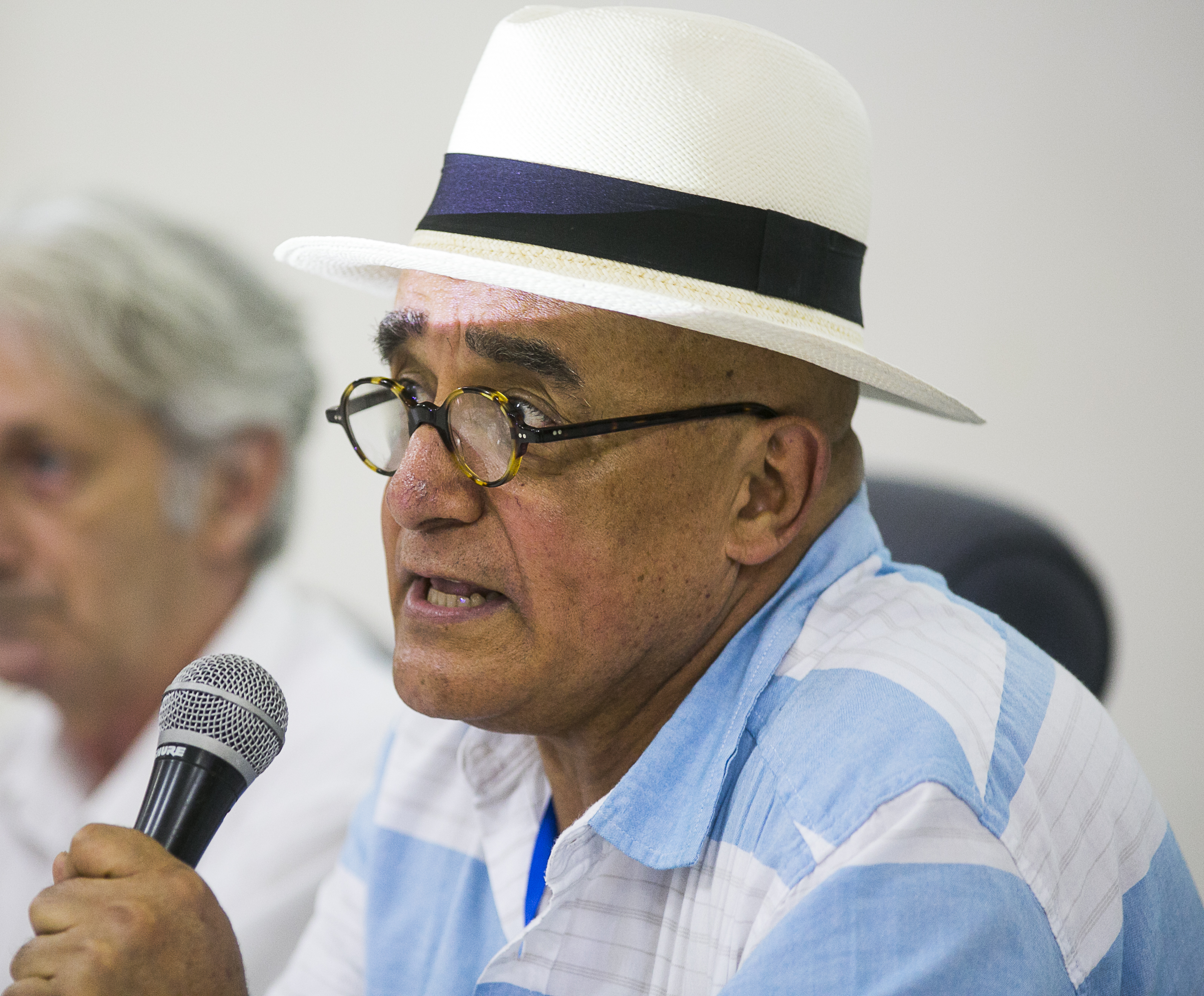
Erick Blandón in 2015

Erick Blandón Guevara (born 1951) is a Nicaraguan writer, professor, and researcher.

== Biography ==
He earned his degree in educational sciences from the National Autonomous University of Nicaragua (UNAN-Managua) and later pursued a master's in creative writing at the University of Texas at El Paso. In his youth, he participated in student protests to overthrow the dictatorship of the Somoza family.

He began his literary career with the publication of the poetry collection Aladrarivo in 1975, followed by Juegos prohibidos (1982) and Las maltratadas palabras (1990). His poetry often features homoerotic exaltation of classical warriors such as Alexander the Great, Achilles, and Patroclus.

In 1994, he published the erotic short story collection Misterios gozosos, followed in 1997 by the novel Vuelo de cuervos. The novel follows the story of a poet asked to document the events of a military operation ordered by the Sandinista government to forcibly evacuate the Miskito Indigenous people as a defense strategy against the counterrevolution, an act that leads to systematic human rights violations. Academic David Rocha has highlighted the novel’s effort to emphasize female leadership and its homoerotic and parodic deconstruction of traditional masculinity during the Sandinista period.

His essay work focuses on cultural deconstruction in Nicaragua, particularly in books such as Barroco descalzo: Coloniality, Sexuality, Gender and Race in the Construction of Cultural Hegemony in Nicaragua (2003). Within this same line of study, he examined the life and work of the Nicaraguan poet Rubén Darío in his book Discursos transversales: La recepción de Rubén Darío en Nicaragua (2011), reissued in 2016 under the title Rubén Darío: un cisne entre gavilanes.

== Works ==
=== Poetry ===
- Aladrarivo (1975)
- Juegos prohibidos (1982)
- Las maltratadas palabras (1990)

=== Narrative ===
- Misterios gozosos (1994), short stories
- Vuelo de cuervos (1997), novel

=== Essays ===
- Barroco descalzo: Coloniality, Sexuality, Gender and Race in the Construction of Cultural Hegemony in Nicaragua (2003)
- Discursos transversales: The Reception of Rubén Darío in Nicaragua (2011)
