= Awastara =

- Municipality
- Location in Nicaragua
- Coordinates: 14°18′N 83°13′W
- Country: Nicaragua
- Department: North Caribbean Coast Autonomous Region

Awastara is a city populated by the Miskito people, located in the department of North Caribbean Coast Autonomous Region in Nicaragua.

The King Pulanka, the traditional feast of the Miskito, originated in Awastara.
