= Caribbean Lowlands =

Plains in Central America

The Caribbean Lowlands are region of plains along the eastern coast of several Central American nations along the Caribbean Sea, including Belize, Honduras, Nicaragua, Costa Rica, and Panama.

== Geography ==
The lowlands are mainly between the major American Cordillera System ranges running down the center of the Central American Isthmus and the Caribbean coast.

The width of the Caribbean lowlands varies dramatically between countries. In eastern Honduras, the lowlands can stretch as much as 100 kilometres (62 mi) inland, while near Puerto Límon in Costa Rica, the lowlands narrow to a width of less than 10 kilometres (6.2 mi). The region takes up over 16% of the territory of Honduras. In Nicaragua, the region encompasses nearly half the country, with an average width of 60 miles (97 km).

There are three major ecosystems in the lowlands: swamp, savanna and tropical rainforest.

== History and inhabitants ==
Several indigenous tribes lived in the lowlands prior to the arrival of the Spaniards. The conquerors of Central America preferred settling the temperate Pacific plain and central highlands and virtually ignored the hot, humid lowlands.

After a population collapse, the area in Costa Rica was only sparsely re-settled until transport links improved, including the completion of a railway in Costa Rica. Today, the Honduran portion of the Caribbean lowlands are home to the Miskito (of mixed European and Amerindian descent) and Garifuna (of mixed African and Amerindian descent) ethnic groups.

== Economy ==
American fruit companies, especially the United Fruit Company and the Standard Fruit and Steamship Company, began growing bananas in the lowlands in the early decades of the 20th century.

Bananas have been a historically important crop of the lowlands area in Costa Rica. Cacao is another significant crop, ranking third in Costa Rican exports after coffee and bananas.

== Climate ==
In Honduras, the lowlands have a tropical wet climate, with fairly consistent rainfall, high temperatures and high humidity, except in December or January, when sometimes a strong cold front arrives from the north to provide some relief.

== Flora and fauna ==
There are many animal species found in the region, including:

- Brown-billed scythebill
- Morelet's crocodile

== See also ==
- Geography of Central America
- Regions of the Caribbean
- Regions of Central America
