= Krukira =

Miskito Indian fishing community in Nicaragua

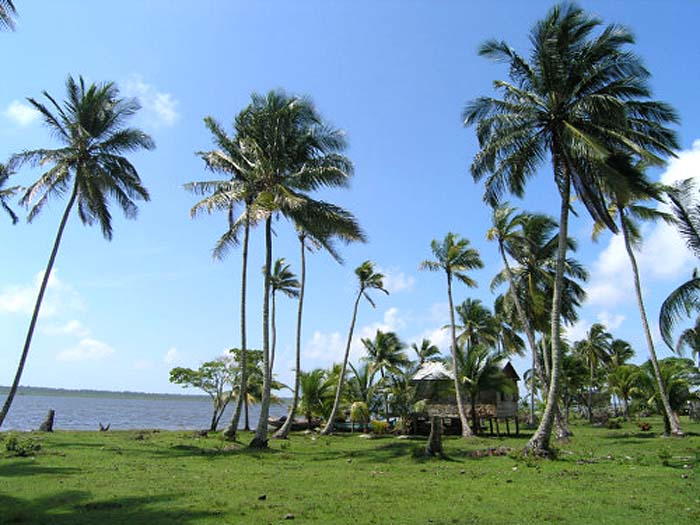
- Krukira Lagoon in 2007.

- Location in Nicaragua
- Coordinates: 14°10′N 83°19′W
- Country: Nicaragua
- Department: North Caribbean Coast Autonomous Region

Population (2023)
  - Total: 861
- Time zone: UTC-6 (Central Time)
  - Summer (DST): UTC-6 (No DST)

Krukira is a Miskito fishing community in the North Caribbean Coast Autonomous Region of Nicaragua.

== Hurricane Felix ==
The area had extensive damage from Hurricane Felix in 2007, and the village was in the path of the eye of the hurricane. According to official information, at least 9,000 houses were destroyed, leaving many of the 40,000 people in the area homeless. Most of those affected lived in Krukira and Puerto Cabezas. The government declared a "State of Disaster" in the area, which suffered a total lack of supplies and services as a result of the storm.

== Gallery ==
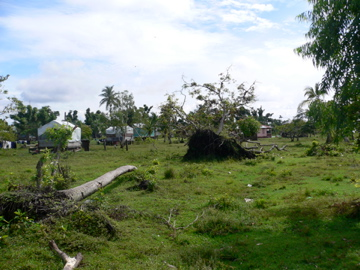
Fallen trees after hurricane Felix in Krukira, October 2008
