= Jonathan Charles Frederick =

- Hereditary Chief of the Miskito Nation
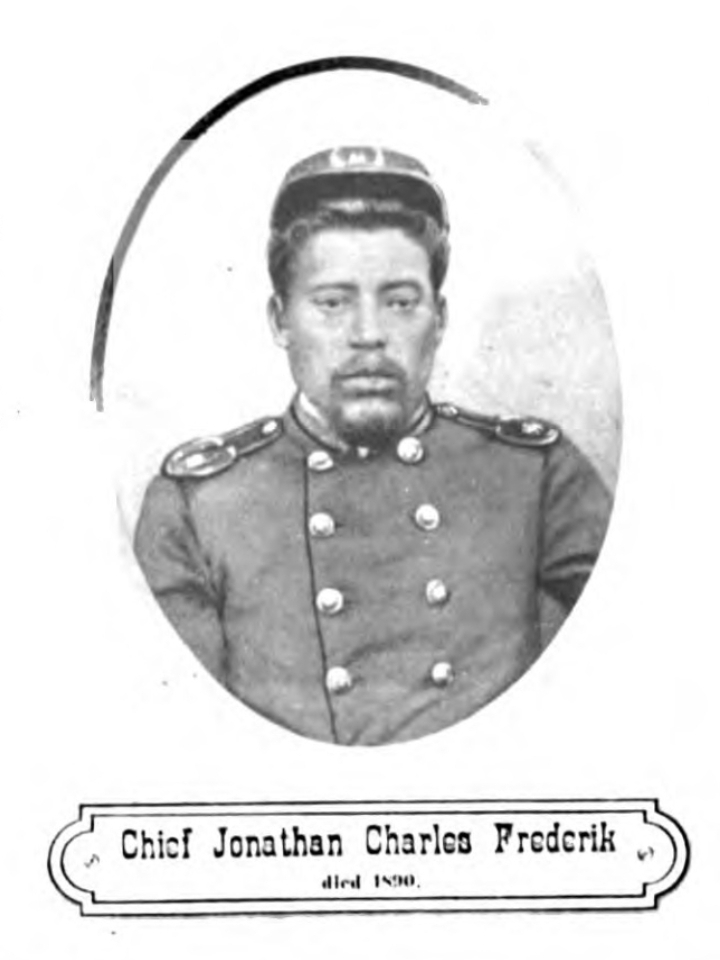
- Reign: 1888–1890
- Investiture: 8 March 1889
- Predecessor: George William Albert Hendy
- Successor: Robert Henry Clarence
- Died: c. 8 July 1890
- Mother: Princess Matilda

Jonathan Charles Frederick, hereditary Chief of the Miskito Nation, was the son of Princess Matilda, who was the daughter of H.M. Robert Charles Frederic, King of the Miskito Nation, by a junior wife. He succeeded after the abdication of his cousin George William Albert Hendy, 8 March 1889, but died after falling from a horse, c. 8 July 1890.
