= Miskito Sambu =

Ethnic group in Mosquitia, Central America

The Miskito Sambu, also known simply as the Miskito, are an ethnic group of mixed cultural ancestry (African-Indigenous American) occupying a portion of the Mosquito Coast in Central America. Although older records, beginning with Spanish documents of the early 18th century, refer to the group as "Mosquitos Zambos", modern ethnographic terminology uses the term Miskito.

== History ==
=== Origin ===
According to early accounts, slaves traveling on a slave ship revolted and took the ship over, but wrecked it near Cape Gracias a Dios, though they disagree on the impact the arrival of these Africans had on the local people, and how they were received. When Alexander Exquemelin, the first and earliest visitor (in c 1671) to the coast to describe the origins of the Miskito Sambu believed that the local people enslaved the Africans anew, while a slightly later account (1688) by the Sieur Raveneau de Lussan, thought that the local people received the Africans hospitably and married with them.

Sources written later still give different accounts. The bishop of Nicaragua, Benito Garret y Arlovi writing in 1711, but basing himself on reports by missionaries who worked in Nueva Segovia and Chontales as well as the testimony of an "ancient" former slave named Juan Ramón, said that the Africans violently overthrew their hosts, and intermarried with their women.

The date and circumstances of the shipwreck are also uncertain. Bishop Garret y Arlovi related that the ship wrecked in 1641, while an English buccaneer only known as M. W., writing in 1699 mentions two different dates in two different places: in one instance he places it as 50 years earlier (or 1649) while in another he places it 60 years earlier (1639), which might mean that his informants told him contradictory information, or that there were two shipwrecks.

According to Exquemelin's original account, the slaves took over the ship in a revolt and brought it to the coast, while the Spanish translation of the account, which may have had access to other sources, said the ship was carrying the slaves to "Tierra Firme" (Panama) and it wrecked on an island and the slaves swam ashore. The French translation adds that the ship was Portuguese and had the intention of carrying the slaves to Brazil, and this section may also have been influenced by other unnamed sources. Pedro de Rivera, writing in 1742 reported that the ship that was wrecked in 1650 "according to tradition" and that it was owned by "Lorenzo Gramalxo" (probably Lorenzo Gramajo, a prominent Portuguese merchant of Cartagena).

=== Rise to dominance ===
This group of mixed ancestry were usually called Mosquitos Zambos by the Spanish, while the others living more on the southern region (in modern Nicaragua) have been dubbed Tawira Miskito (Straight-haired Miskito) by modern scholars such as Karl Offen. Over the course of the eighteenth century, the Miskito Sambu became dominant, and the office of king was in Sambu hands from the first decade of the century onward.

There are a number of later stories which recount the same sequence of events, though often with different details, and different possible dates. It is possible that these accounts are of separate shipwrecks, or that the same wreck was elaborated in later accounts through oral tradition.

The Miskito Sambu were aggressive, an early report of 1699 has them waging near constant war with their neighboring Indigenous groups. The Spanish reported many raids directed against their holdings beginning in 1699 and continuing through most of the 18th century. The raids often carried off slaves, for use at home or for sale to English traders from Jamaica, who sent them to the island to work. The English also supplied the Miskito Sambu with muskets and military training to assist in these raids. Raiding reached as far south as modern Costa Rica and as far north as the Yucatán.

According to the French buccaneer Raveneau de Lussan, who visited in 1688, the Sambu settled largely in the valley of the Wanks River (modern Rio Coco), and the report of the buccaneer M. W. in 1699, their settlements were concentrated in that river, and somewhat to the west along the coast of modern-day Honduras almost as far as Trujillo. By the early eighteenth century, the leader of the Sambu group had the Miskito title General in the chieftaincy system of the Mosquito Coast. At some point in the early eighteenth century, however, the Sambu took over the premier title of King, and the palace that was occupied by a Tawira king, Jeremy, in 1699 was now occupied by a "mulatto", also named Jeremy, in 1711. From that point on, the Sambu held the kingship.

The emergence of the Miskito Sambu gradually split the larger Miskito people in two; be that as it may, the Sambu group was generally dominant and the more aggressive. In what was essentially a power sharing system, Sambus held the northern titles of King and General, while the original Miskitos (otherwise called Tawira) held the titles of Governor and Admiral.

== See also ==
- Miskito people
