= John Hendy =

John Hendy may refer to:

- John Hendy, Baron Hendy, English barrister
- John Hendy (American football), American football defensive back
- John Hendy, member of boy band East 17
