= William Henry Clarence =

Former Hereditary Chief of Mosquitia

- Hereditary Chief of the Miskito
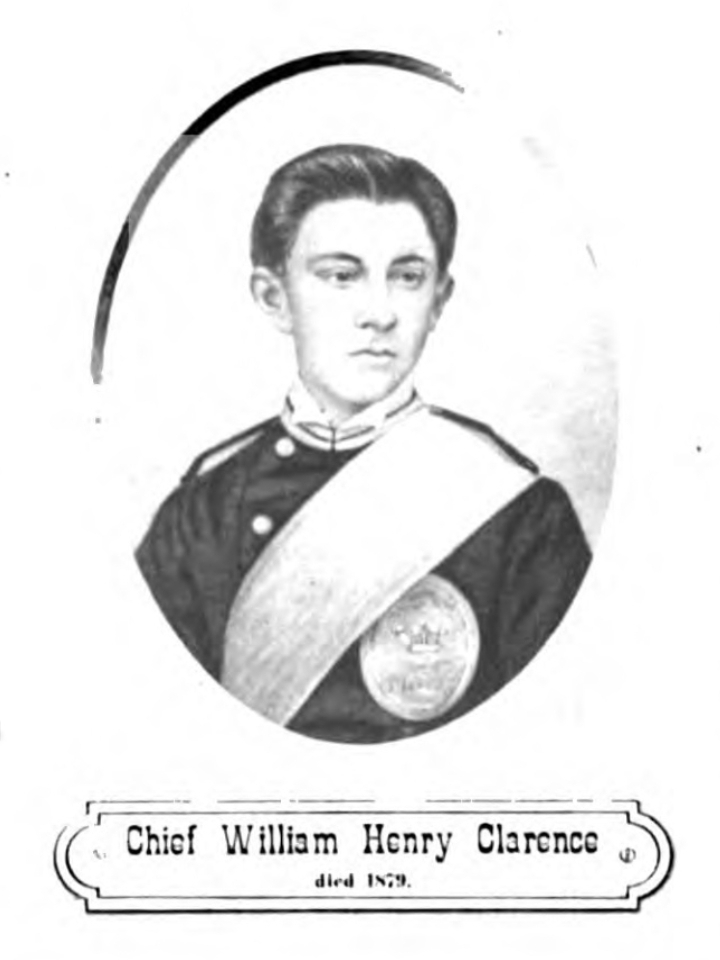
- Reign: 1865-1879
- Coronation: c. 23 May 1866
- Predecessor: George Augustus Frederic
- Successor: George William Albert Hendy
- Born: 1856
- Died: 5 May 1879 (aged 22–23)

William Henry Clarence (1856–1879) was King, or Hereditary Chief, of the Miskito. He was educated privately at Kingston, Jamaica. He succeeded on the death of his uncle George Augustus Frederic II, 27 November 1865 and was crowned, c. 23 May 1866. He reigned under a Council of Regency until he came of age and assumed full ruling powers in 1874. He was poisoned on 5 May 1879, at age 23.
