= Tawira Miskito =

Indigenous people of Nicaragua

The Tawira Miskito are a branch of the Miskito people of Nicaragua that speak the Tawira variety of the Miskito language.

The Tawira are related to the Miskito Sambu, who intermarried with Africans who had shipwrecked on the coast in the mid-seventeenth century. The term is unattested before the early nineteenth century, though it may have come into existence before that time.
