= George William Albert Hendy =

Former Hereditary Chief of Mosquitia

- Hereditary Chief of the Miskito Nation
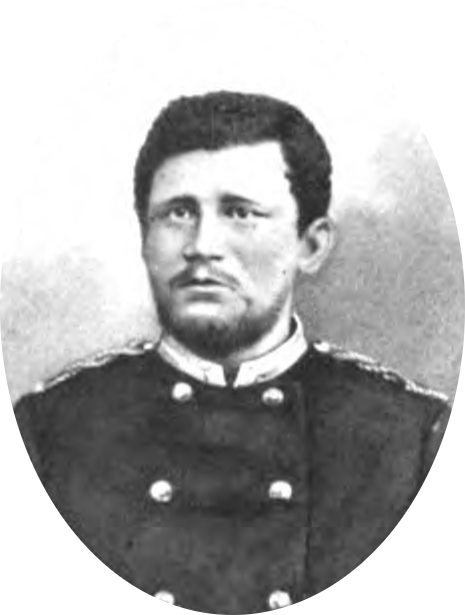
- Reign: 1879-1888
- Investiture: 23 May 1879
- Predecessor: William Henry Clarence
- Successor: Andrew Hendy
- Died: 8 November 1888

George William Albert Hendy was the Hereditary Chief of Mosquitia from 1879 to 1888. He was the grandson of King George Frederic Augustus II He was elected on 17 June 1879 by the Council of State to succeed after the death of his cousin William Henry Clarence on 23 May 1879. He died on 8 November 1888.
