= George Augustus Frederic =

King of Mosquitia from 1842 to 1864

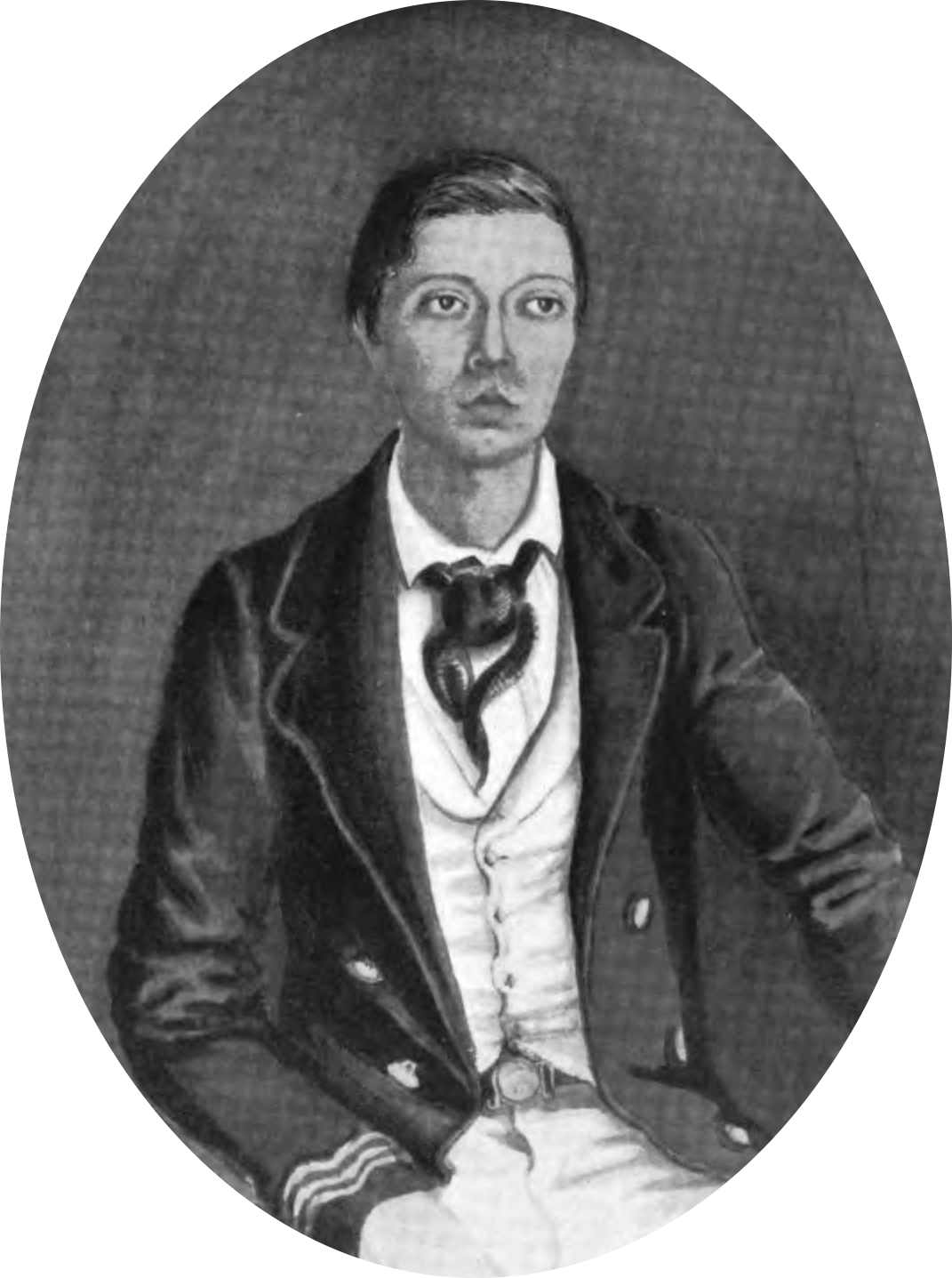

King of Mosquitia
- Reign: 1845–1864
- Coronation: 7 May 1845
- Predecessor: Robert Charles Frederic
- Successor: William Henry Clarence
- Born: c. 1833
- Died: 1864 (aged 30–31)
- Father: Robert Charles Frederic

George Augustus Frederic was king of Mosquitia from 1845 to 1864. He ruled at a time when the kingdom was subject to international rivalry.

== Early life ==
He was born around 1833, the son of King Robert Charles Frederic. In 1840 King Robert Charles, established a will which created a council to oversee the affairs of the country in the last years of his reign, and to insure that his heir be advised during a regency, and that the education and support of his family be maintained. The will granted considerable power to the Superintendent, Alexander MacDonald, to appoint councilors, and gave the council full power to institute and change laws, aside from the law establishing the Church of England as the official church.

== Reign ==
George Augustus was only about 9 when his father died, and the Regency Council created by his father and MacDonald, having been rejected in Great Britain, was resumed with a different composition, this time under Superintendent Patrick Walker. However, in addition to this council, there was also a regency organized within the kingdom itself, consisting of "Prince" Wellington, "Colonel" Johnson and "General" Lowrey, recognized by the British government on 4 May 1843. He was crowned in Belize on 7 May 1845, when only 12 years old. The next year, 1846, the king abolished the regency council and appointed a new one with the original councilors appointed in honorary positions and a new staff, composed of Creole inhabitants of Bluefields to continue the regency.

The Council, acting in his name, passed a number of laws establishing a militia under local command and control, and abolishing land grants given by his father which were claimed to be irregular, as well as abolishing "Indian Laws and Customs," primarily judicial procedures, which were to be handled by royally appointed magistrates, and regulating woodcutting.

King George supported Great Britain and allowed a variety of Superintendents to operate within the kingdom to advance its interests, and in turn he received their political support. As a part of this support, the English declared a Protectorate over the Miskito Kingdom in 1844, and used the kingdom as a cover for the expansion of British strategic interests in Central America. Perhaps the most notable of these initiatives was the expansion of the kingdom's center to the south, first to Bluefields and then to San Juan del Norte, where he cooperated, with the support of British naval forces, with the expulsion of the Nicaraguan garrison and the annexation of the town to the Miskito Kingdom in 1848. Holding this town gave Britain and the Miskito Kingdom control of an important point in a canal to connect the Atlantic and Pacific.

The southern expansion met strong resistance from the Republics of Nicaragua and Honduras, as well as the United States, who wished to limit British influence in Central America. Potential violence took place as the United States and Britain squared off between 1850 and 1854 around San Juan del Norte, ultimately leading to Britain renouncing its Protectorate role at the Treaty of Managua in 1860. Under the terms of the treaty, Britain would recognize Nicaraguan sovereignty over the Miskito kingdom, while reserving for its people the right to self-government, and payment of an annual stipend to the king. The treaty withdrew international recognition of George as "king" and held him to be only the "hereditary chief" of an entity called the "Reserva Mosquita."

While the treaty was significant as far as the international standing of the Miskito Kingdom was concerned, neither Nicaragua nor Britain had been able to occupy, tax or collect revenue from the kingdom. Consequently, the treaty had little internal significance either to the inhabitants or the domestic status of King George. In 1861, George Augustus, now calling himself "Hereditary Chief" and giving his residence as Bluefields, Mosquito Reservation, summoned a council to enact what amounted to a constitution of the new entity. It recognized the boundaries as established by the Treaty of Managua, reiterated the existing laws passed in 1846, and establish a two tier governing body with power exercised by qualified elected officials (male gender, literacy and property being specified as qualification). This system allowed for shared power between the largely Creole population and the indigenous population.

== Competence and character ==
George Augustus was frequently characterized as being a simpleton and incompetent by detractors, both from within the British government and by United States writers, especially E. G. Squier. These writers were inclined to present him as a puppet of British interests, and to suppose that his kingdom was not actually capable of governing itself.
