= List of San Diego Historic Landmarks in the Point Loma and Ocean Beach areas =

This is a list of San Diego Historic Landmarks in the Point Loma and Ocean Beach areas. The Point Loma and Ocean Beach neighborhoods are located in the central coastal region of the city of San Diego, in southwestern San Diego County, California.

== Introduction ==
In 1967, the City of San Diego established a Historical Resources Board with the authority to protect buildings and other structures as historical landmarks. In total, the city has designated more than 850 structures or other properties as designated historic landmarks. This list includes details on more than 50 San Diego Historic Landmarks located in the Point Loma peninsula and Ocean Beach areas.

Many of the properties have also received recognition at the federal level by inclusion on the National Register of Historic Places or by designation as National Historic Landmarks.

== Listing of the San Diego Historic Landmarks on the Point Loma peninsula ==
| SDHL # | Landmark name | Image | Address | Designation Date | Description |
|---|---|---|---|---|---|
| 16 | Whaling Station Site | | Ballast Point Peninsula | 11/6/1970 | Shore station where whale blubber was boiled down for the oil in the 1850s and 1860s, halfway out on the inner beach of Ballast Point |
| 17 | Lighthouse of 1854 | | Cabrillo National Monument; 32°40′19″N 117°14′26″W | 11/6/1970 | Lighthouse built at the mouth of San Diego Bay from 1854–1855; remained in service until 1891; restored and re-lit by the National Park Service in 1984 |
| 19 | Fort Rosecrans National Cemetery | | Point Loma peninsula 32°41′12″N 117°14′41″W | 11/6/1970 | National military cemetery overlooking the bay and the city; remains of U.S. soldiers killed in the Battle of San Pasqual were moved there in 1882 |
| 20 | Ballast Point | | La Playa Peninsula | 11/6/1970 | Probable site of Cabrillo's initial landing; site of Fort Guijarros; now part of Naval Base Point Loma |
| 22 | Old La Playa Site | | Bayside of Pt. Loma | 11/6/1970 | |
| 23 | Fort Rosecrans Site | | Point Loma peninsula 32°41′10″N 117°14′12″W | 11/6/1970 | Fort established in 1852; designated as a monument after World War II |
| 27 | Fort Guijarros | | Near base of Ballast Point Peninsula; 32°41′06″N 117°14′07″W | 11/6/1970 | Spanish fort built in 1797 on Ballast Point as the first defensive fortifications for San Diego Bay; name means "Fort Cobblestones"; involved in the Battle of San Diego, a naval battle with an American trading vessel |
| 55 | Jennings House (Oldest house in Point Loma) | | 1018 Rosecrans St. 32°43′14″N 117°13′58″W | 1/7/1972 | Frame house built in 1886; childhood home of Belle Jennings Benchley simultaneously serving as a one-room elementary school; now a restaurant |
| 107 | Cliff Mansion | | 1203 Sunset Cliffs Blvd. 32°43′57″N 117°15′19″W | 12/5/1975 | Built in 1925 for developer John P. Mills |
| 112 | Theosophical Institute | | 3900 Lomaland Dr. 32°42′59″N 117°15′01″W | 8/6/1976 | Commune based on theosophy founded at Point Loma in 1897 by Katherine Tingley; became known as Lomaland, a regional center for the arts; now the site of Point Loma Nazarene University; buildings include Spaulding Home, Greek Theatre, Beaver Home, Lotus Home, and Madam Tingley Home |
| 142 | Neresheimer-Tingley House | | 430 Silvergate Ave. 32°42′44″N 117°14′43″W | 3/7/1980 | Victorian home built for Katherine Tingley, head of the Theosophical Institute |
| 233 | Sefton-Campbell Estate | | 3850 Narragansett Ave. 32°44′07″N 117°14′09″W | 11/30/1988 | Built in 1914 |
| 360 | Milton F. Heller Residence/Casa Marrero | | 3107 Zola St. 32°44′16″N 117°13′11″W | 5/27/1998 | Spanish eclectic house built in 1927, designed by architects Richard Requa and Herbert Jackson |
| 371 | Thomas Hamilton House | | 480 San Fernando St. 32°42′42″N 117°14′25″W | 12/9/1998 | Craftsman Japonesque house built in 1910, designed by architect Emmor Brooke Weaver |
| 373 | Monteiro Family Residence | | 1050 Scott St. 32°43′13″N 117°13′52″W | 2/24/1999 | Single wall redwood board and batten cottage built in 1908 for Jose Monteiro and family |
| 379 | World War II Base-End Station | | 3900 Lomaland Dr. 32°42′57″N 117°15′01″W | 4/28/1999 | Base-end observation station built in 1942 as part of WWII coastal defense network; only remaining intact observation station with elliptical front and featuring sliding metal shutters |
| 398 | Ocean Beach Gateway Archaeological Site | | 2304 Sunset Cliffs Blvd. 32°45′04″N 117°14′31″W | 11/17/1999 | Archaeological site with record of more than 330 years of occupation by the La Jolla complex |
| 400 | Ella Strong Denison House | | 373 San Gorgonio St. 32°42′34″N 117°14′30″W | 12/15/1999 | Mediterranean Revival house built 1926–1927, designed by architect Herbert E. Palmer |
| 401 | Dixon House | | 3838 Dixon Place; 32°44′00″N 117°14′16″W | 1/27/2000 | Queen Anne Victorian house built in 1898 by Albert Dixon |
| 442 | Ocean Beach Cottage Emerging District | | Various; 32°44′14″N 117°15′08″W | 10/26/2000 | Various Craftsman bungalows, cottages and other structures built from 1887–1931; designated properties include 2076 Bacon St.; 4711, 4746, 4765, 4909 Brighton Ave.; 4725, 4775 Coronado Ave.; 5044 Del Monte Ave.; 1971, 2120 Ebers St.; 4626, 4631 Larkspur St.; 4733, 4738, 4932–4936 Long Branch Ave.; 4726 Lotus St.; 4978 Narragansett Ave.; 4709 Orchard Ave.; 4742 Pescadero Ave.; 4651, 4764 W. Point Loma Blvd.; 4967, 4985 Saratoga Ave.; 2060, 2090 Sunset Cliffs Blvd.; 4956, 4972 Voltaire St. |
| 453 | Hildred R. and Marion M. Peckham House | | 2905 Nichols St. 32°42′39″N 117°14′14″W | 12/20/2000 | Mediterranean style house built in 1927, designed by architect William Templeton Johnson |
| 460 | Conard-Arrington House | | 809 San Antonio Pl. 32°42′59″N 117°14′08″W | 3/22/2001 | Ranch style house built in 1949, designed by architect Roy Drew |
| 466 | Bowman-Cotton House | | 2900 Nichols St. 32°42′40″N 117°14′14″W | 5/24/2001 | Spanish eclectic style house built in 1929, designed by architects Richard Requa and Herbert Jackson |
| 477 | 3726 Elliott Street Residence | | 3726 Elliott St. 32°44′42″N 117°13′26″W | 8/23/2001 | Spanish eclectic style house built in 1929, designed by architects Richard Requa and Herbert Jackson |
| 486 | Rosecroft | | 1530 Silvergate Ave. 32°42′46″N 117°14′41″W | 9/21/2001 | Italian Renaissance style house designed by Emmor Brooke Weaver, built in 1912 for Alfred D. Robinson and Marion James Robinson; they also created the adjacent Rosecroft Begonia Gardens, which was a tourist site during the 1940s, 1950s and 1960s. |
| 490 | Thomas I. and Florence M. Stephens House | | 2772 Evergreen St. 32°44′34″N 117°13′00″W | 9/21/2001 | English Tudor cottage built 1925–1926, built by Ideal Building Co. |
| 512 | 2939 Owen Street House | | 2939 Owen St. 32°42′43″N 117°14′13″W | 2/28/2002 | Spanish eclectic style house built in 1935; believed to be designed by architect Richard Requa |
| 516 | Donna and Harold Lush House | | 1576 Willow St. 32°43′45″N 117°13′48″W | 4/25/2002 | Spanish eclectic style house built in 1928 |
| 529 | Myrtle B. and George F. Reuter House | | 1570 Willow St. | 7/25/2002 | Spanish eclectic style house built in 1928 |
| 533 | Glen Fucheon/Douglas T. Kelley House | | 4423 Alhambra St. | 8/22/2002 | Mediterranean style house built c. 1929 |
| 536 | Bernard and Dora Junker/Rear Admiral Cyrus Cole House | | 2878 Rosecrans St. | 9/26/2002 | Spanish eclectic style house built in 1926 |
| 554 | James Dillon and Lenore Heller Forward/Richard S. Requa-Milton Sessions House | | 3123 Zola St. | 10/24/2002 | Spanish eclectic style house built in 1927, designed by architect Richard Requa |
| 555 | George Burnham House | | 2916 Chatsworth Blvd. | 10/24/2002 | Prairie style house built in 1913, designed by architect Walter Keller |
| 556 | Winfield and Ella Sellers/William Sterling Hebbard House | | 1055 Akron St. | 10/24/2002 | Modern style house built in 1915, designed by architect William Sterling Hebbard |
| 561 | Strand Theatre | | 4948 Newport Ave., Ocean Beach; 32°44′46″N 117°15′00″W | 12/20/2002 | Built in 1925 |
| 565 | Ocean Beach Library | | 4801 Santa Monica Ave., Ocean Beach; 32°44′43″N 117°14′50″W | 12/20/2002 | Spanish/Monterey style library built in 1928; designed by architect Robert W. Snyder |
| 573 | James Wood Coffroth/Frank Stevenson House | | 2775 Chatsworth Blvd. | 2/27/2003 | Italian Renaissance Revival style house built in 1923 |
| 574 | Florence Everingham House | | 3108 Elliott St. | 2/27/2003 | Spanish eclectic, Monterey style house built in 1930 |
| 575 | J.L. Brown Spec House | | 2858 Evergreen St. | 2/27/2003 | Prairie Style house built in 1912 |
| 576 | Frank Guasti House | | 3105 Freeman St. | 2/27/2003 | Spanish eclectic style house built in 1931 |
| 577 | Herbert Bathrick House | | 3211 Freeman St. | 2/27/2003 | Spanish eclectic style house built in 1929 |
| 578 | Frank W. Stevenson House | | 3143 Goldsmith St. | 2/27/2003 | Spanish eclectic/Mission Revival style house built in 1924 |
| 579 | William and Annie Simpson House | | 3252 Goldsmith St. | 2/27/2003 | Prairie style house built in 1913 |
| 580 | Hal Huldah Hotchkiss House | | 2677 Locust St. | 2/27/2003 | Colonial Revival style house built in 1936 |
| 585 | Col. Howard Tatum/Richard Requa House | | 2540 Jonquil St. | 4/24/2003 | Spanish Revival house built in 1926, designed by architect Richard Requa |
| 604 | William and Minerva Welton Spec House#1 | | 3021 Elliott St. | 8/28/2003 | Spanish eclectic style house built in 1926 |
| 605 | Dr. William Cooke House | | 3130 Elliott St. | 8/28/2003 | Spanish eclectic style house built in 1926 |
| 606 | Rear Admiral Charles Hartman/Pear Pearson House | | 3027 Freeman St. | 8/28/2003 | Spanish eclectic style house built in 1935; built by Pear Pearson of Pearson Construction Co. |
| 607 | Lilian Bonfils House | | 3035 Kingsley St. | 8/28/2003 | Spanish eclectic style house built in 1925 |
| 628 | Alice Clark House | | 3026 Freeman St. | 10/23/2003 | Spanish eclectic style house built in 1929 |
| 629 | Clarence Swenson/Richard Requa House | | 3610 Amaryllis St. | 10/23/2003 | Spanish eclectic style house built in 1926, designed by architect Richard Requa |
| 631 | Lewis Dodge Spec House#1 | | 4660 Tivoli St. | 10/23/2003 | Spanish eclectic style house built in 1927 |
| 633 | Herbert Kunzel/Robert Mosher House | | 3250 McCall St. | 11/21/2003 | Modernist Craftsman house with Japanese influences built in 1951, design by architect Robert Mosher; appeal overturned designation but later redesignated as No. 715 |
| 649 | Lola McAvoy Spec House#1 | | 3414 Freeman St. | 3/5/2004 | Spanish Colonial Revival house built in 1933 |
| 650 | James Wood Coffroth House | | 3279 Homer St. | 3/5/2004 | Prairie style house built in 1914 |
| 651 | Dr. Harry and Beryl Faulkner House | | 3003 Kingsley St. | 3/5/2004 | French eclectic house built in 1939; associated with E.H. Depew |
| 652 | Col. David and Sydney Roscoe House | | 2710 Rosecrans St. | 3/5/2004 | Spanish eclectic house built in 1926 |
| 691 | Viggo and Tommye Effenberger House | | 2628 Rosecrans St. | 10/28/2004 | |
| 715 | Herbert Kunzel/Robert Mosher House | | 3250 McCall St. | 5/26/2005 | Modernist house with oriental influences built in 1951, designed by architect Robert Mosher; designation appealed |
| 718 | Strawn House | | 3120 Owen St. | 6/17/2005 | Neoclassical style house built in 1933, designed by Ralph L. Frank |
| 719 | Joseph and Esten Shreve House | | 4510 Alhambra St. | 7/28/2005 | Spanish eclectic house built in 1928 |
| 773 | 4528 Saratoga Avenue | | 4528 Saratoga Ave. 32°44′37″N 117°14′28″W | 8/24/2006 | American Craftsman structure built in 1924; contributing to Ocean Beach Cottage Emerging Historic District |
| 774 | 4535 Cape May Avenue | | 4535 Cape May Ave. 32°44′39″N 117°14′27″W | 8/24/2006 | American Craftsman structure built in 1927; contributing to Ocean Beach Cottage Emerging Historic District |
| 838 | Gertrude Ossenburg House | | 3614 Hyacinth Dr. | 9/27/2007 | Spanish eclectic house built in 1933 |
| 844 | Louis & Bertha Feller/Homer Delawie House | | 3377 Charles St. | 11/8/2007 | Post and Beam Modernist house built in 1962, designed by architect Homer Delawie |
| 845 | Delawie Residence III - The Village | | 2749 Azalea Dr. | 11/8/2007 | Post and Beam Modernist house built in 1973, designed by architect Homer Delawie |
| 855 | Kettenburg Boat Works | | 1271 Scott St.; 2810 Carleton St. | 2/28/2008 | Designation applies to site only and not structures; designated for importance as site where Kettenburg boats were built |
| 861 | Katherine Redding Stadler House | | 2750 Rosecrans St. | 3/27/2008 | Italian Renaissance house built in 1914; associated with Gustav A. Hanssen |
| 863 | Alfred and Julia Southard House | | 3612 Elliott St. | 3/27/2008 | Spanish eclectic house built in 1927 |
| 869 | T. Claude Ryan House | | 548 San Fernando St. | 5/22/2008 | Built in 1962 for T. Claude Ryan, creator of several aeronautical companies and designer of multiple airplanes |

== See also ==
- List of San Diego Historic Landmarks — all.
- List of San Diego Historic Landmarks in La Jolla
- List of California Historical Landmarks in San Diego County, California
- National Register of Historic Places in the City of San Diego, California
