= San Juan de Nicaragua =

San Juan de Nicaragua Greytown
- Municipality
- Location in Nicaragua Location in Central America
- Coordinates: 10°55′N 83°42′W
- Country: Nicaragua
- Department: Río San Juan

Area
  - Municipality: 1,657 km^{2} (640 sq mi)

Population (2023)
  - Municipality: 2,812
  - Density: 1.697/km^{2} (4.395/sq mi)
  - Urban: 1,740

San Juan de Nicaragua (formerly known as San Juan del Norte) is a municipality in the Río San Juan Department of Nicaragua. Its capital is Greytown (formerly also known as San Juan del Norte).

== History ==
San Juan del Norte was founded by the Spanish and was a small fort and customs station. Spanish explorers first reached the bay at the mouth of the San Juan River on 24 June (feast day of Saint John the Baptist) 1539 and named it San Juan del Norte ('St. John of the North'). A garrison was first established in 1541 as San Juan de la Cruz by Nicaraguan governor Rodrigo Contreras.

In 1707 and again in 1762, the area was captured by an alliance of Miskitos, Zambos (Afro-Indians), and English. After 1762, settlement of the area began and a 1778 commercial treaty permitted residency of Spaniards. The eastern coast of Nicaragua had long fallen under British influence with the Mosquito Coast being a protectorate from 1740 but the Spanish asserted control over San Juan del Norte after the 1786 Convention of London. The town was declared a free port by the Spanish but the Spanish were ousted in 1821 with the independence of Central America.

In 1841, the town was occupied by the Miskitos with British assistance and, in 1847, the town was occupied directly by the British. It was rechristened Greytown after the then Jamaican Governor Charles Edward Grey and nominally ceded to the Miskito Kingdom, a British protectorate to the north.

A year later, the town began rapid growth as the eastern terminus of a transport operation owned by American Cornelius Vanderbilt's Accessory Transit Company that carried thousands of travelers each month from the Atlantic to the Pacific side of Central America on their way to San Francisco during the California Gold Rush. Sail and steam-ships traveled from New York City and New Orleans in the United States to Greytown. From there, small boats transported passengers up the San Juan River and across Lake Nicaragua. Then, mules, horses, or stagecoaches carried them over the small isthmus between the lake and San Juan del Sur, Rivas on the Pacific where they would embark on ships traveling the coast between Panama and Nicaragua and California.

However, the town's prosperity was cut short when, on 13 July 1854, the United States Navy sloop USS Cyane bombarded and totally burned the town, supposedly in retaliation for local actions against American citizens. The action was a culmination of a confrontation between Americans and the townspeople over tariffs and control of transit routes. The destruction was reported around the world, including an illustration in the Illustrated London News. Soon after, the San Juan River changed course and the town was again destroyed.

Greytown was rebuilt after its destruction and, in 1855, the American filibuster William Walker installed himself as President of Nicaragua and took control of the Accessory Transit Company's assets and revoked its charter. He himself was ousted in 1857 by elements backed by Vanderbilt. Walker and his followers attempted to retake Nicaragua in November 1857, when they entered Greytown harbor and camped at nearby Puntas Arenas. However, U.S. Marines soon surrounded the forces and captured Walker.

Vanderbilt then ceased operation of the transit service in exchange for a stipend from the rival Pacific Mail Steamship Company and the United States Mail Steamship Company, which operated similar routes across Panama. As a result, Greytown reverted to backwater status and remained a small settlement into the 20th century.

The town was legally placed under the sovereignty of Nicaragua and removed from Miskito control in 1860 but remained de facto under British protection through much of the remainder of the century. In 1894, Nicaraguan President José Santos Zelaya fully incorporated the region into the state, at which time Greytown had 1482 inhabitants.

In 1984, Greytown was attacked again during the Sandinista–Contra conflict in which a US helicopter, while supporting the Contras, fired on the town on 9 April 1984.

A new town was built a few kilometers to the northwest and is called both New Greytown and Nuevo San Juan del Norte.

In 2002, the municipality of San Juan del Norte was officially renamed San Juan de Nicaragua and its capital renamed Greytown by the National Assembly of Nicaragua.

== Geography ==
San Juan de Nicaragua lies on what is known as the Mosquito Coast. It is located at the mouth of the San Juan River which flows east from Lake Nicaragua and is along the route of various proposals for a Nicaragua Canal to the Pacific Ocean.

The town's geography is influenced by the San Juan River delta with volcanic sediment deposits from Costa Rican volcanoes interacting with ocean currents and winds. This action fills the town's harbor with shifting sandbars and spits.

== Climate ==
San Juan de Nicaragua has a very wet tropical rainforest climate (Köppen Af) with heavy rainfall from February to April and very heavy to extremely heavy rainfall in the remaining months. It is the wettest place in Nicaragua, and its annual rainfall of around 5,700 millimetres or 220 inches rivals Whittier or Little Port Walter in the Alaska Panhandle as the wettest inhabited place in North and Central America.

Climate data for San Juan de Nicaragua
| Month | Jan | Feb | Mar | Apr | May | Jun | Jul | Aug | Sep | Oct | Nov | Dec | Year |
|---|---|---|---|---|---|---|---|---|---|---|---|---|---|
| Mean daily maximum °C (°F) | 29.6 (85.3) | 30.2 (86.4) | 31.4 (88.5) | 31.7 (89.1) | 31.5 (88.7) | 30.3 (86.5) | 30.2 (86.4) | 30.0 (86.0) | 30.1 (86.2) | 29.9 (85.8) | 29.1 (84.4) | 29.0 (84.2) | 30.3 (86.5) |
| Daily mean °C (°F) | 25.4 (77.7) | 25.9 (78.6) | 27.0 (80.6) | 27.5 (81.5) | 27.4 (81.3) | 26.4 (79.5) | 26.6 (79.9) | 26.3 (79.3) | 26.0 (78.8) | 25.8 (78.4) | 25.4 (77.7) | 25.1 (77.2) | 26.2 (79.2) |
| Mean daily minimum °C (°F) | 21.3 (70.3) | 21.6 (70.9) | 22.6 (72.7) | 23.3 (73.9) | 23.3 (73.9) | 22.6 (72.7) | 23.1 (73.6) | 22.6 (72.7) | 22.0 (71.6) | 21.8 (71.2) | 21.7 (71.1) | 21.2 (70.2) | 22.3 (72.1) |
| Average rainfall mm (inches) | 454 (17.9) | 237 (9.3) | 139 (5.5) | 200 (7.9) | 372 (14.6) | 559 (22.0) | 785 (30.9) | 599 (23.6) | 384 (15.1) | 482 (19.0) | 764 (30.1) | 695 (27.4) | 5,670 (223.3) |
Source: Climate-Data.org

== Population ==
As part of the Mosquito Coast, San Juan de Nicaragua has a large population of Moskitian Creole speakers who are of African descent.

== Popular culture ==
- W. Douglas Burden describes the town in his Look to the Wilderness.
