= George N. Hollins =

American naval officer (1799–1878)

George Nichols Hollins
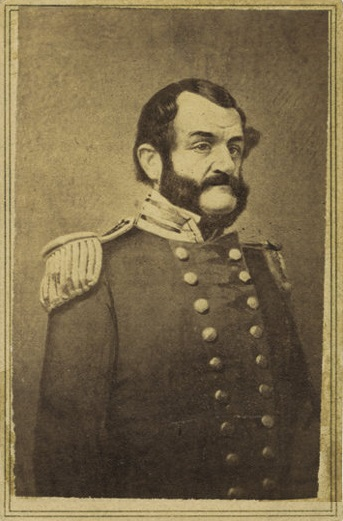
- Born: September 20, 1799; Baltimore, Maryland, U.S.
- Died: January 18, 1878 (aged 78); Baltimore, Maryland, U.S.
- Military career
- Allegiance: United States of America; Confederate States of America
- Branch: United States Navy; Confederate States Navy
- Service years: 1814–1861 (U.S.); 1861–1865 (C.S.)
- Rank: Captain; Commodore
- Conflicts: War of 1812; Barbary Wars; Mexican-American War; Bombardment of Greytown; American Civil War

George Nichols Hollins (September 20, 1799 – January 18, 1878) was an American navy captain and base commander in the United States Navy and later a ship captain and commodore in the Confederate States Navy. He famously won the Battle of the Head of Passes, a naval battle of the American Civil War, returning to New Orleans a hero.

== Personal life ==
Commodore George Nichols Hollins was born in Baltimore, Maryland. On March 20, 1833, he married Maria Ridgely, daughter of Lieutenant Colonel Joseph Sterett.

His son, George Nicholas Hollins, Jr., was born in 1840 in Baltimore and died during the American Civil War in 1862.

== Naval career ==
Hollins entered the United States Navy as a midshipman in 1814 and served on the USS Erie in her attempt to break the British blockade of Chesapeake Bay in the War of 1812. He was subsequently transferred to the USS President where he served under Stephen Decatur until captured at Bermuda. He was held as a prisoner of war until peace was established. In the Barbary Wars, he served under Decatur with such merit as to be presented a sword in recognition of his gallantry. Subsequently, he was on duty upon the ships Guerriere, Columbus, Franklin, and Washington, and commanded an East India merchantman for a time. He was promoted lieutenant in 1828, commander in 1841, and captain U.S. Navy in 1855. In 1853, he led the Bombardment of Greytown (Nicaragua), a naval action initiated by the United States sloop-of-war USS Cyane, which he commanded. The town was completely destroyed without loss of life, Hollins having made arrangements for the inhabitants to leave safely.

== Civil War ==
At the outbreak of the American Civil War, Hollins had served for almost 47 years in the U.S. Navy (almost 17 years total at sea), was a citizen of Florida, and was commanding the USS Susquehanna, cruising at the Mediterranean Sea. Hollins and his ship left the coast of Italy on May 5, 1861, and arrived at Boston, Massachusetts, on June 4, 1861. Having considered himself a Southerner, he promptly resigned his commission, but it was not accepted and an order was made for his arrest. Hollins escaped, and in March 1861, was in Montgomery, Alabama, then the Confederate capital, where he met Raphael Semmes, Josiah Tattnall, Thomas Brent, and many other naval officers to consult with a committee of the Confederate Congress on the means of providing a navy for the new government. He was commissioned a Captain, Confederate States Navy, on June 22, 1861. He later received a commission for the same rank, but to rank retroactively to March 26, 1861. On June 29 of the first year of the Confederacy, he quickly attracted attention by his clever capture of the steamer St. Nicholas in the Potomac River, as well as the capture of the Monticello, Mary Pierce and the Margaret. On July 10, the naval defenses of the James River were placed under his command, and on July 31, he was put in charge of the naval station at New Orleans, where he defeated the Federal blockading squadron the following October. Also that year, he served at the naval defenses, James River, Virginia.

From 1861 to 1862, he was the Commandant at the Naval Station, New Orleans, Louisiana. Hollins then commanded the defenses afloat the Mississippi River, with his flagship the CSS Manassas on the coast of Louisiana.

Appointed flag officer in December 1861, he took a fleet up the Mississippi River to assist in the defense of the works at Columbus, Kentucky.

From 1862 to 1863, he commanded the Richmond, Virginia Station, and in 1863, he commanded at Charlotte, North Carolina. In 1864, he again commanded the Richmond, Virginia Station, and then at the Wilmington, North Carolina Station. After the war, he returned to Baltimore, Maryland where he was appointed Crier at the City Court, and was in that position until his death on January 18, 1878.

== See also ==
- Diplomacy of the American Civil War
- Henry Hotze
- Stephen Mallory
