= Ballast Point Whaling Station =

Historical Landmark in San Diego, California, United States

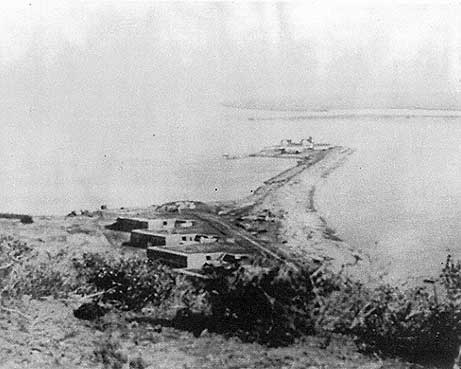
- Ballast Point in the 1900

- Location within California Location within the United States
- 32.683°N 117.236°W
- Location: US Naval Submarine Base San Diego

History
- Built: 1858

Site notes
- Architect(s): Alpheus and William Packard

California Historical Landmark
- Designated: December 6, 1932
- Reference no.: 50

Ballast Point Whaling Station in San Diego is a California Historical Landmark No. 50 listed on December 6, 1935. The Ballast Point Whaling Station was built in 1858 by Captain Miles A. Johnson his cousins, Henry and James A. Johnson and the twin Packard brothers, Alpheus and William, brothers. The Portuguese-American Johnsons, Alpheus and William came to San Diego from Massachusetts in 1856. The Ballast Point Whaling Station was on Ballast Point. The whaling station processed whales to make whale oil. Whale oil was a very popular as in oil lamps it produced little smoke. Whale oil was also used in miner's headlamps, lighthouses, soaps, and candles, and as machinery lubricant. In 1869 the United States acquired the site for a quarantine station and built a lighthouse and later Fort Rosecrans, named after Major General William Rosecrans. Whaling operations at Ballast Point stopped in 1873. In 1946 the site became a U.S. Navy submarine base. The site today is Naval Base Point Loma founded in 1959. A Ballast Point Whaling Station historic marker is located on the Navy Base. Before Ballast Point Whaling Station the site was the Spanish Fort Guijarros

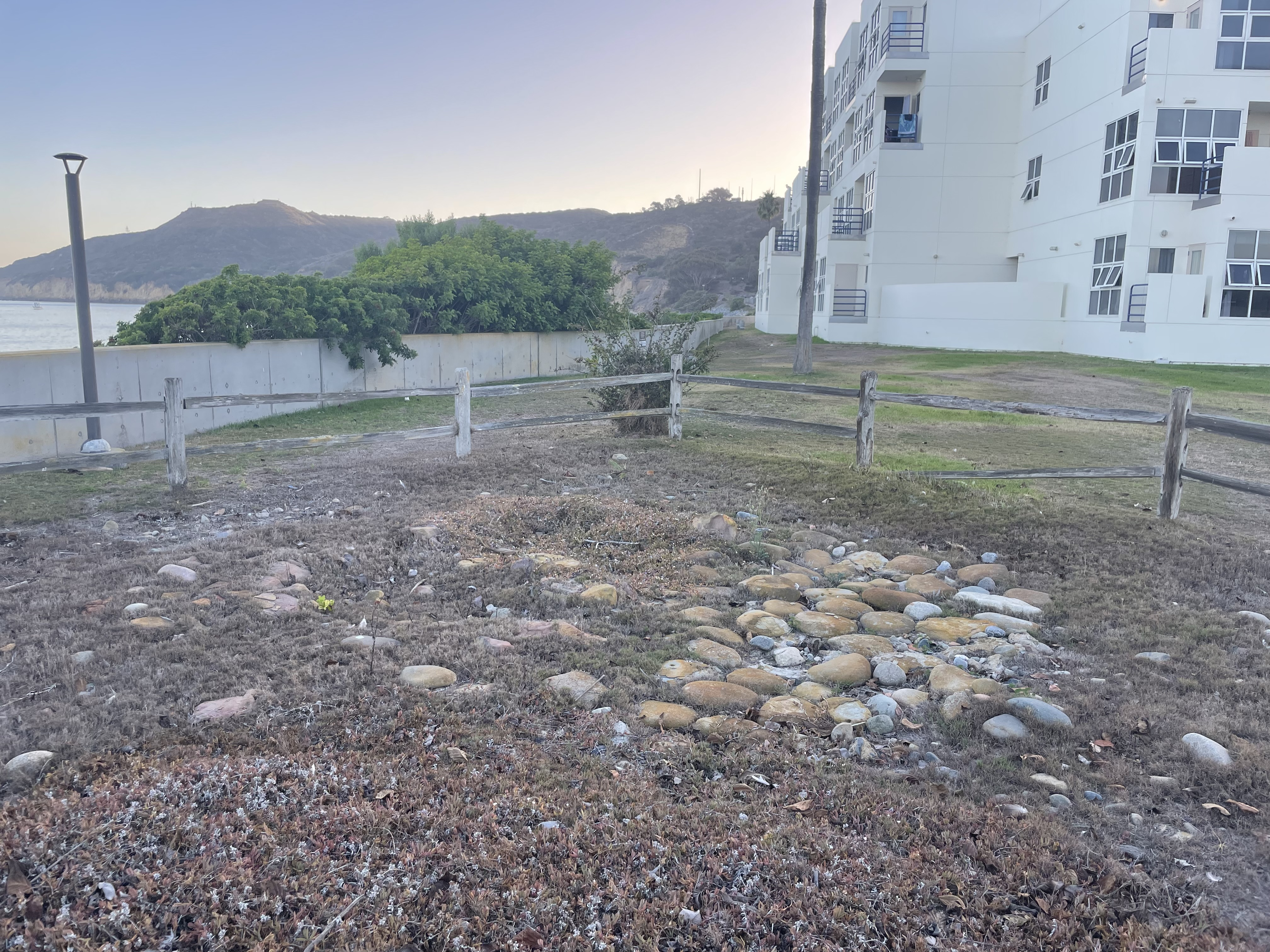
Ruins of the whaling station in 2025.

California gray whales were hunted for the Ballast Point Whaling Station. Captain Packard and his brother hunted whales for four years off the California Coast. Portuguese, Africans, Irish, Spaniards, Mexicans and Englishmen all hunted whales on the California Coast. There was a second major whaling station at La Playa. Gray whales swam between warm breeding grounds off Mexico and the rich feeding grounds off Alaska and Arctics. Gray whales were hunted on this route. San Diego whaling ended in the 1880s as petroleum oil was now less costly and the whale population has drop vastly. Gray whales, humpback whales, blue whales, and right whales are now a protected species.

== See also ==
- California Historical Landmarks in San Diego County
- Ballast Point Lighthouse
