= USS Cyane =

USS Cyane may refer to:

- USS Cyane (1815), was captured from the Royal Navy in 1815 and taken into the US Navy, where she served until 1836.
- USS Cyane (1837), was a 22-gun sloop-of-war, launched in 1837 and decommissioned in 1871
- USS Cyane (YFB-4), was formerly Gwin, renamed Cyane on 11 April 1918
