= Richard Requa =

American architect (1881–1941)

Richard Smith Requa
- Born: March 27, 1881; Rock Island, Illinois, U.S.
- Died: June 10, 1941 (aged 60); San Diego, California, U.S.
- Resting place: Greenwood Memorial Park, San Diego, California, U.S.
- Citizenship: United States
- Occupation: Architect
- Spouse: Viola Hust (m. 1908)
- Practice: Requa and Jackson
- Buildings: California Pacific International Exposition buildings; Old Globe Theatre; Del Mar Castle; St. Thomas Aquinas Chapel; Torrey Pines Lodge; San Diego County Administration Center
- Projects: Planning and design work for Rancho Santa Fe, California; architectural development of Kensington, San Diego; work on Balboa Park (San Diego)
- Design: Spanish Revival architecture; Spanish Colonial Revival architecture; Mission Revival Style architecture

Richard Smith Requa (March 27, 1881 – June 10, 1941) was an American architect, largely known for his work in San Diego, California. Requa was the Master Architect for the California Pacific International Exposition held in Balboa Park in 1935–36. He improved and extended many of the already existing buildings from the earlier Panama–California Exposition, as well as creating new facilities including the Old Globe Theatre.

His own designs were predominantly in the Spanish Revival architectural style, occasionally blending them with American Craftsman influences, working to preserve San Diego's Spanish-influenced history. His firm, Requa and Jackson, were the architects of choice in San Diego during the 1920s, dominating the area with their "Southern California Style" that blended Mediterranean and Mission stylings.

== Life and career ==
Requa was born in Rock Island, Illinois, in 1881, and in 1900 at the age of 19 moved to San Diego, California, with his parents. He died at the age of sixty on June 10, 1941, of a heart attack while working in his office, and is buried at Greenwood Memorial Park in San Diego. He was married in 1908 to Viola Hust in San Diego.

Requa made early use of home movies to capture architectural ideas on trips to Spain, the Mediterranean, Santa Cruz, San Francisco, Monterey, and the Pueblos of the Southwest.

He designed many landmark homes in the San Diego area, in addition to his work on the 1935 California Pacific International Exposition in Balboa Park. In 1925, Requa designed the Del Mar Castle in Del Mar, California, for Ruth and Marston Harding, a home that later was owned by the McGaugh family 1950–1963, and then by the motivational speaker Tony Robbins. He was the architect for many of San Diego's historical landmarks in La Jolla as well as historical landmarks in Point Loma. He also had an especially large influence on the character of the Kensington district of San Diego.

== Notable works ==
- The 1935 California Pacific International Exposition in Balboa Park, San Diego, California
- The Old Globe Theatre in Balboa Park, San Diego, California
- The San Diego County Administration Center (with other architects)
- The initial layout of the city of Rancho Santa Fe, California, appointing Lilian Jeannette Rice as the lead planner in 1921
- The St. Thomas Aquinas Chapel in Ojai, California
- The original Torrey Pines Lodge, now the visitor center for Torrey Pines State Natural Reserve
- The Mount Helix Nature Theatre in La Mesa, California
- The Del Mar Castle, located at 544 Avenida Primavera, Del Mar, California
- The D. E. Mann House, located at 1045 Loma Avenue, Coronado, California
- The William A. Gunn House, located at 1127 F Avenue, Coronado, California
- Requa's first home, built for himself in 1913, located in Mission Hills at 4346 Valle Vista, San Diego, California
- Requa's second home, built for himself in 1921, located in Loma Portal at 2906 Locust Street, San Diego, California
- Furniture for the George W. Marston House, a museum and San Diego Landmark, located in Balboa Park

== See also ==
- Mediterranean Revival Style architecture
- Mission Revival Style architecture
- Category: Spanish Revival architecture
- Category: Spanish Revival architects
- Category: Spanish Colonial Revival architects
- Category: Spanish Colonial Revival architecture in California
