= Homer Delawie =

American architect

San Diego architect Homer Delawie

Homer T. Delawie, FAIA, was an award-winning modernist architect working (primarily) in San Diego from the late 1950s to the 1990s. He designed numerous public, commercial, and residential projects, including the Bea Evenson Fountain in the Plaza de Panama, Balboa Park, the Coronado Library, the M. Larry Lawrence Jewish Community Center and expansion, the Scripps Miramar Ranch High School, the School of Creative & Performing Arts in South Bay, the San Diego Hospice, and projects for UC San Diego, the San Diego Zoo, San Diego State University, and Qualcomm.

Born in Santa Barbara on September 24, 1927, Delawie worked in forestry as a teen before serving in the U.S. Navy at the end of World War II. He graduated from the new School of Architecture at Cal Poly San Luis Obispo in 1951. Delawie was the school's first licensed architect, its first National Design Award winner, and its first to be elected to the AIA’s National College of Fellows.

Delawie worked briefly with modernist architect Lloyd Ruocco, FAIA, before opening his own office in 1962. His "Boxcar House" (Delawie Residence #1, 1958) in Mission Hills, a 17’ wide modernist house built on a 25' lot, merited his first architectural award. Two of Delawie's residential projects, both post and beam Modernist houses (from 1962 and 1973), are among San Diego Historic Landmarks in the Point Loma and Ocean Beach areas. Many of his residential projects were showcased in Sunset Magazine in the 1960s and 1970s, and examples of his work can be seen in Mission Hills, Del Mar, and Point Loma.

In the 1980s, Delawie designed major public works such as the SeaWorld Penguin Exhibit, the San Diego Police Headquarters, and the Metropolitan Transit System's James R. Mills Building. In collaboration with architects Michael Wilkes and Larry Rose, he designed the Reuben H. Fleet Science Center space theater expansion.

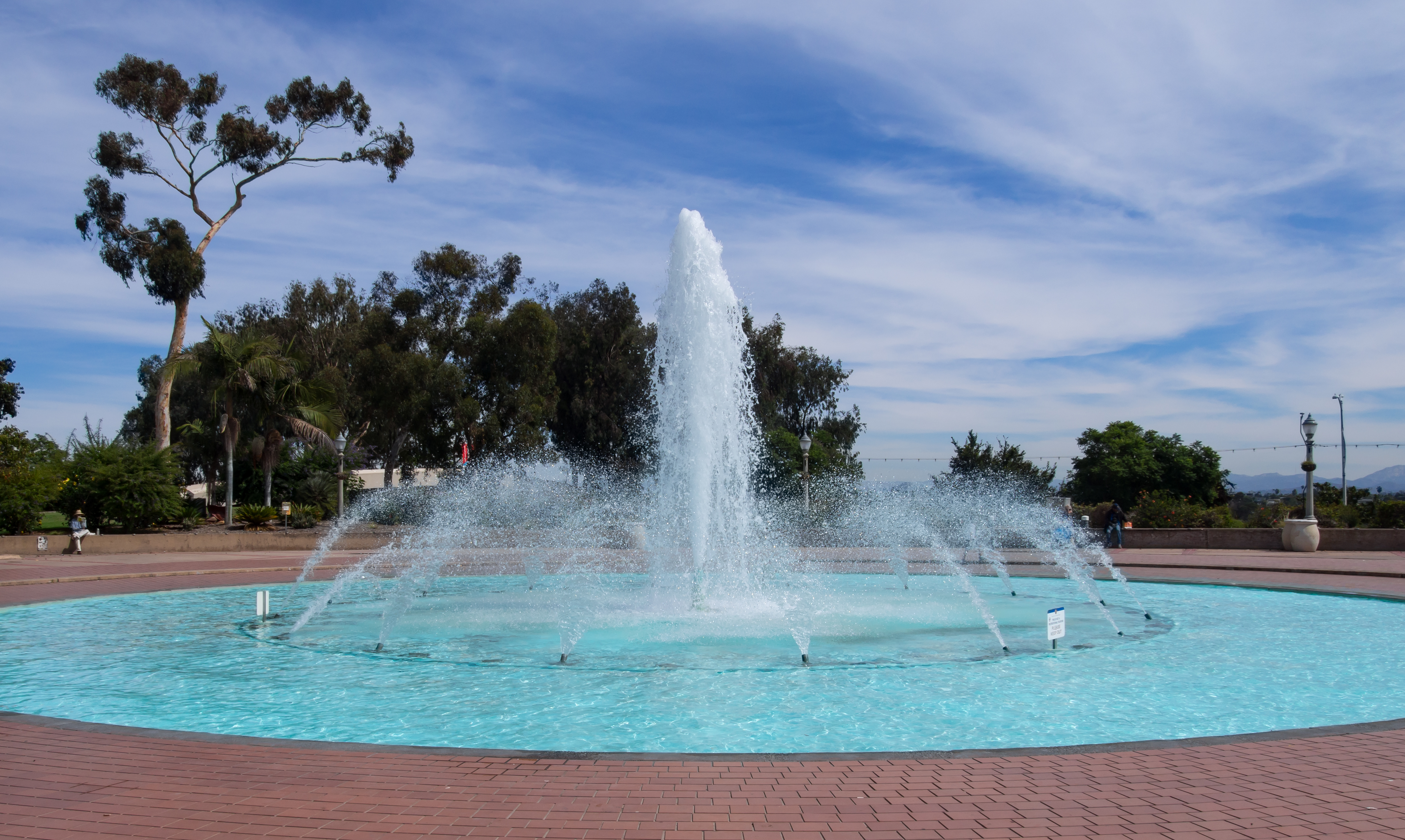
Bea Evenson Fountain

He was engaged in civic planning and development issues in San Diego and served as chapter president of the AIA, and on a number of state and national committees and design juries. Locally he served on the city's Historical Resources Board and the Planning Commission and (with preservationist Robert Miles Parker) helped start the Save Our Heritage Organisation.

In 1973, Delawie received the Cal Poly School of Architecture Distinguished Alumni Award. The National Urban Land Institute and the California and San Diego chapters of the AIA have awarded Delawie their highest honors, including Service Citations in 1972 and 1973, a Presidential Citation in 1997 and a Lifetime Achievement Award in 1997. Projects by Delawie and his architecture firm have received over 65 design awards.

Delawie died on June 26, 2009, in San Diego.
