= St. Thomas Aquinas Chapel (Ojai, California) =

- U.S. National Register of Historic Places
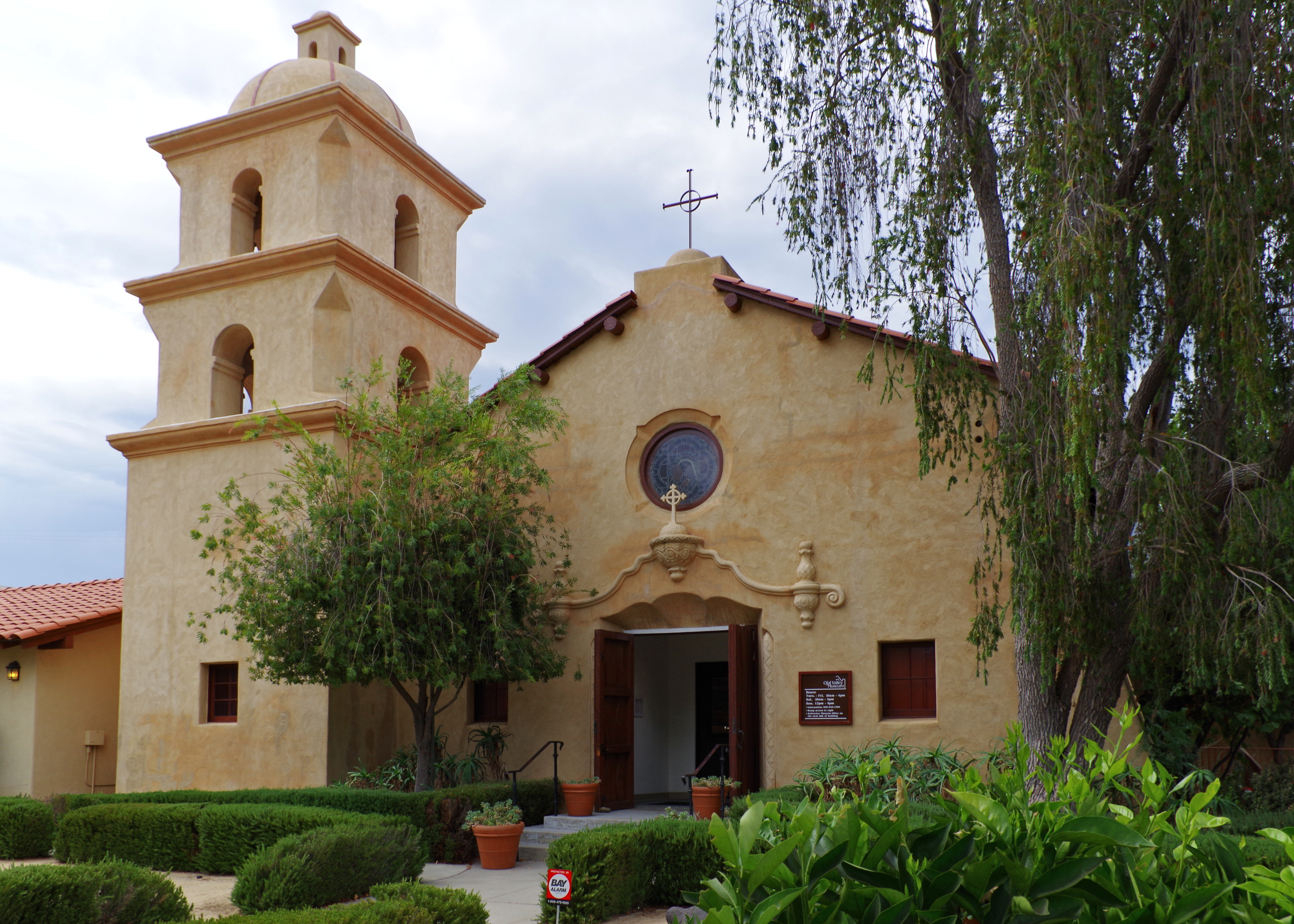

- Location within California Location within the United States
- Location: 130 W. Ojai Ave., Ojai, California
- Coordinates: 34°26′52.26″N 119°14′52.06″W
- Built: 1918
- Architect: Richard Requa, Frank Mead
- Architectural style: Mission Revival—Spanish Colonial Revival
- NRHP reference No.: 95000785
- Added to NRHP: June 29, 1995

St. Thomas Aquinas Chapel is a former Catholic chapel located in Ojai, in Ventura County of southern California. It now houses the city's museum, research library, and historical society.

== History ==
=== Church ===
The St. Thomas Aquinas Chapel was designed by regionally renowned San Diego architect Richard Requa, and Frank Mead, in the Mission Revival with Spanish Colonial Revival style. It was built in 1918 to replace Ojai's original wooden Catholic church that had been destroyed by fire. Requa also designed the Mission—Spanish Colonial styled downtown Arcade and Watchtower landmarks, as part of civic leader Edward Drummond Libbey's early 20th century Ojai city beautification project.

=== Transition ===
In 1963, the parish outgrew the downtown facility and moved to Meiners Oaks. By the early 1990s, the historic chapel was described as "cracked and crumbling to its foundation, and temporarily locked behind a rented chain-link fence." In 1990 church officials considered demolishing the chapel and selling the land. City officials and historical and architectural preservationists responded by seeking funding to acquire and preserve the building.

In 1993 the City of Ojai purchased the historic chapel and parish hall from the Catholic Church for $385,000. The city restored and renovated the building for use by Ojai city and Ojai Valley non-profit organizations. The Aquinas chapel was added to the National Register of Historic Places in 1995.

== Current civic uses ==
The St. Thomas Aquinas Chapel building now houses the Ojai Valley Museum, Ojai Valley Historical Society, and the Ojai Valley Museum Research Library. The museum exhibits collections of vintage Ojai pioneer artifacts and photographs, Chumash Native American baskets, and contemporary art.

== See also ==
- List of Registered Historic Places in Ventura County, California
