= James R. Mills Building =

Office tower in San Diego, California

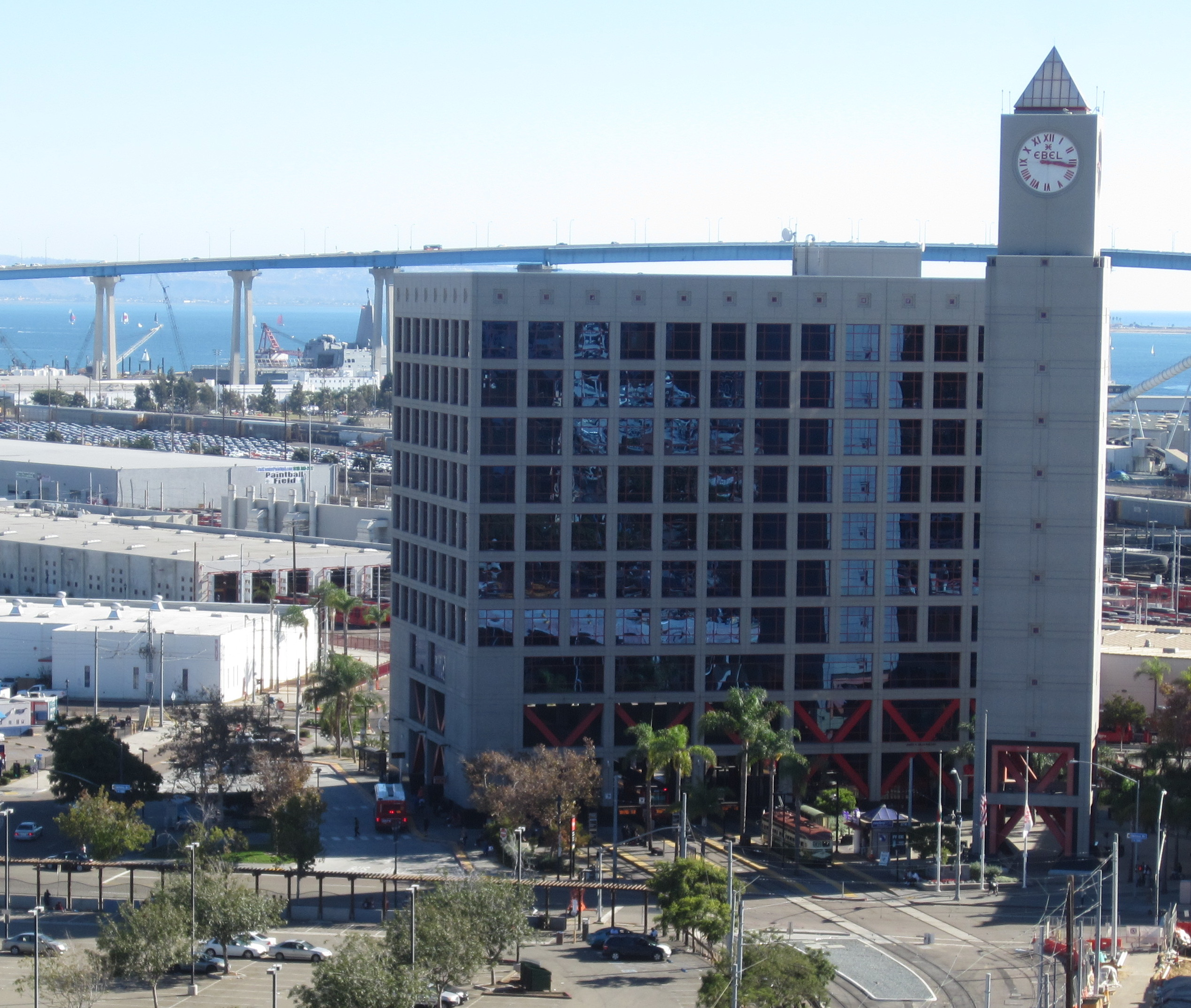
- James R. Mills Building and Ebel Clock Tower
- Interactive map of the James R. Mills Building area
- Alternative names: MTS Tower

General information
- Type: Governmental office
- Architectural style: Modernism
- Location: 1255 Imperial Avenue; San Diego, California; United States
- Coordinates: 32°42′21″N 117°09′12″W
- Current tenants: San Diego Metropolitan Transit System; County of San Diego
- Named for: James R. Mills
- Groundbreaking: November 19, 1987
- Opened: January 3, 1989
- Cost: $43.6 million
- Owner: San Diego Regional Building Authority

Height
- Height: 120 feet (37 m)

Technical details
- Floor count: 10
- Floor area: 180,000 sq ft (17,000 m^{2})
- Grounds: 3.4 acres

Design and construction
- Architect: Homer Delawie
- Architecture firm: Delawie, Bretton, Wilkes and Associates
- Developer: Starboard Development
- Main contractor: M. H. Golden Company
- Awards: 1990 American Institute of Architects, California Council Honor Award; 1991 Urban Land Institute Award of Excellence

Other information
- Parking: 1,020-space garage (adjacent)
- Public transit: 12th & Imperial Transit Center

The James R. Mills Building is a 120-foot (37 m) mid-rise governmental office tower in San Diego, California, United States. The building is alternatively known as the MTS Tower, as it is the headquarters of the San Diego Metropolitan Transit System (MTS). The building also houses various offices for the County of San Diego. The building was completed in 1989 and is located directly above 12th & Imperial Transit Center, a major transfer point in the San Diego Trolley system, with trains passing through the base of the building.

A 200-foot (61 m) clock tower is located in the plaza in front of the building. There is a 1,020-car parking garage located adjacent to the building which offers paid parking for employees and MTS patrons.

The building is named in honor of James R. Mills (June 6, 1927 – March 27, 2021), a California state lawmaker who authored legislation creating the San Diego Trolley. He was also chairman of the San Diego Metropolitan Transit Development Board (the predecessor of today's Metropolitan Transit System) from 1985 to 1994.

== History ==
The San Diego Metropolitan Transit Development Board (MTDB) was formed in 1975, and was tasked with planning, constructing a mass transit system for the region. On August 20, 1979, the MTDB purchased the San Diego and Arizona Eastern (SD&AE) Railway which had its main railyard in downtown San Diego. Using the facilities of the SD&AE, in July 1981 the agency was able to open the first line of the San Diego Trolley, between downtown San Diego and the international border in San Ysidro. The San Diego Trolley added a second line to the east on March 20, 1986, with the two lines meeting at a station near 12th and Imperial Avenues, just outside of the railyard.

By the 1980s, the growing MTDB started to look at moving out of leased office space and into its own headquarters. The agency initially planned to build a three-story building near the railyard and 12th & Imperial station, but during planning, the MTDB was approached by the County of San Diego which offered to increase the size of the building to house some of its agencies. The planned building grew first to five stories before the group finally settled on a ten-story building.

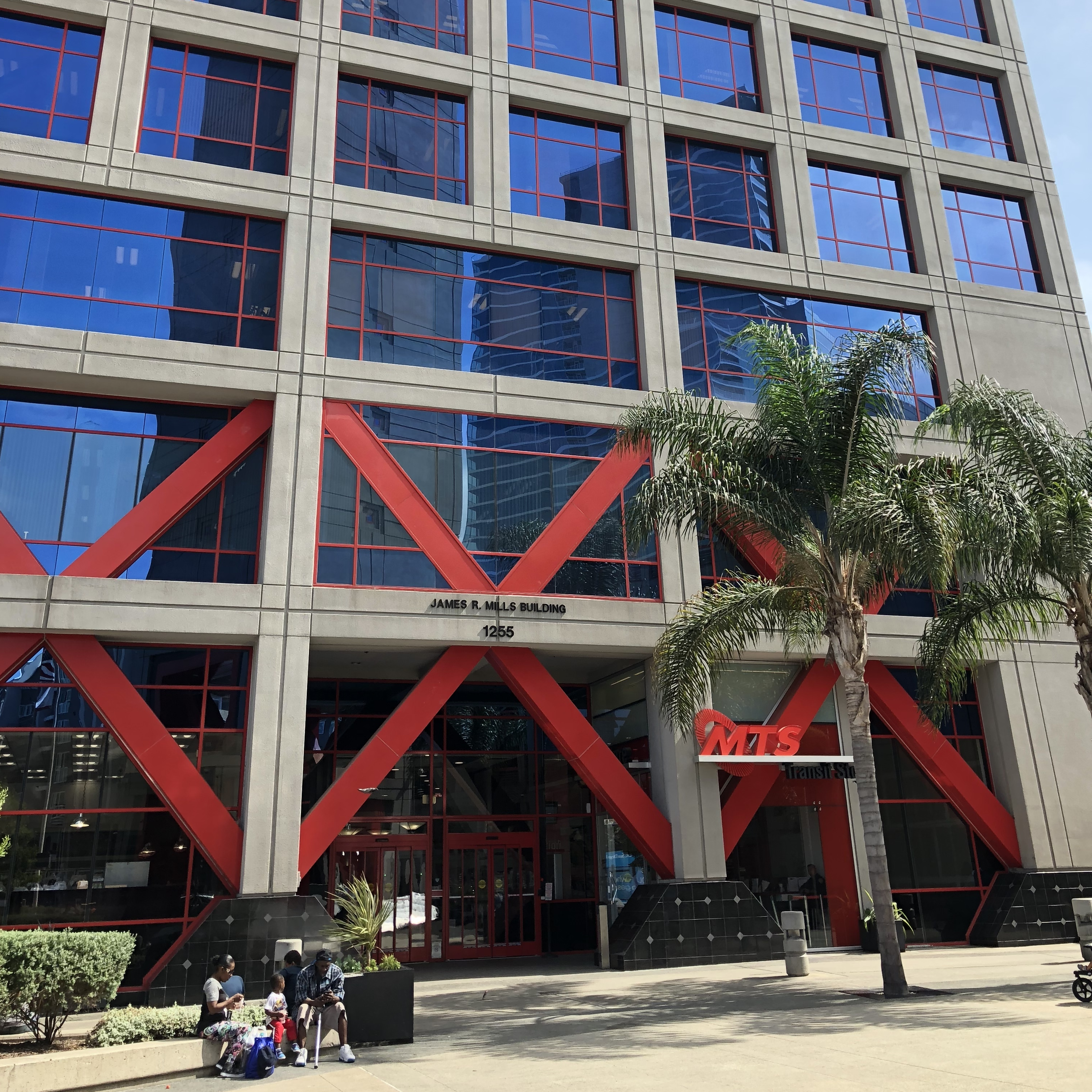
Close up of the James R. Mills Building showing the "San Diego Trolley red" accents and STO exterior

In January 1987, San Diego architect Homer Delawie, the senior partner of Delawie, Bretton, Wilkes and Associates presented his plan for the headquarters to the MTDB. The 10-story building would straddle the 12th and Imperial station with trains passing through the lobby, and the property would also include an iconic 200-foot (61 m) clock tower and a 1,020-space parking garage that was envisioned as a place where people could park and ride the trolley to offices in the Downtown Core or events at the then-under construction San Diego Convention Center. The building would be trimmed in red (the color of the San Diego Trolley) and the ground floor would contain 7,500 square feet (700 m^{2}) of retail space. The project was meant to play key role in plans to revitalize the East Village (also called Centre City East), a gritty neighborhood known for its dilapidated housing and aging businesses.

Construction of the project was financed with a then-new method: the developer, Starboard Development Company would sell $43.5 million in bonds with Swiss financiers, and upon completion of the building, the debt would be transferred to the San Diego Regional Building Authority, a joint powers authority created by San Diego County and the MTDB. The debt was repaid based on floor space with the MTDB occupying two stories, or approximately 28 percent of the building, while San Diego County leases the remaining 72 percent.

Groundbreaking for the project was held on November 19, 1987, with a ceremony that included the launching of fireworks. The M. H. Golden Company would serve as the general contractor for the project, which was targeted for completion in the spring of 1989. Construction would present additional challenges with trolleys continuing to operate through the site and the architect choosing to use unusual material called STO for the exterior which is insulated, waterproof and allowed for unique window recesses and details.

The huge US$750,000 (equivalent to $2,041,714 in 2025) handmade clock featured in the clock tower was a gift from Ebel, a Swiss watch company. The donation was arranged by the Swiss banking official who helped sell the construction bonds. The four-sided clock has red roman numerals, 6-foot-long black hands, and white faces with powerful backlighting so it can be seen at night. The clock also has musical chimes with electronic speakers. It was shipped unassembled to San Diego from Switzerland in a jumbo jet and over 12 days, Swiss technicians put the timepiece together on site. In recognition of the donation, on December 1, 1988, the structure was dedicated as the Ebel Clock Tower.

The building was finished in less than 14 months, significantly ahead of schedule, earning the Starboard Development Company a US$50,000 (equivalent to $129,866 in 2025) bonus. The final cost for the building was $43,600,000 (equivalent to $113,000,000 in 2025). The building officially opened on Tuesday, January 3, 1989, after employees spent the New Year's Day holiday weekend moving in.

After opening, the building was named in honor of James R. Mills, a former California state senator who authored legislation creating the San Diego Trolley. He was also chairman of the San Diego Metropolitan Transit Development Board (the predecessor of today's Metropolitan Transit System) from 1985 to 1994.
