= Bombardment of Greytown =

1854 American bombardment of the Mosquito Coast

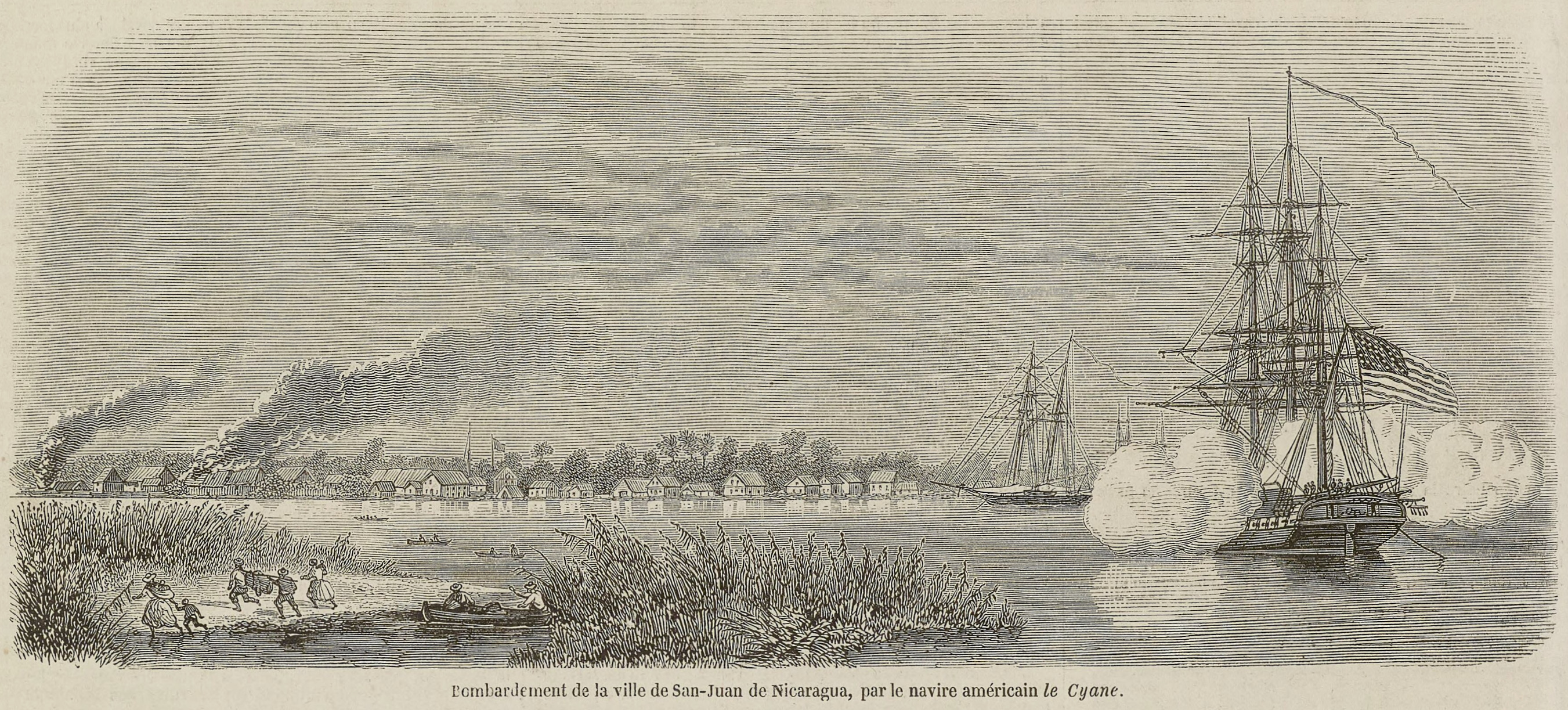
- An illustration of USS Cyane bombarding Greytown
Date	13 July 1854
Location	Grey Town, Mosquitia
Result	American victory: Monroe Doctrine enforced; Beginning of a gradual decline of Mosquitia as a British Protectorate

Belligerents
United States	Mosquitia

Commanders and leaders
George N. Hollins	Unknown

Strength
1 sloop-of-war	None

Casualties and losses
None	None

Greytown, Nicaragua (also known as San Juan de Nicaragua or San Juan del Norte) was a contested port on the Atlantic Coast of Central America. Nicaragua regarded it as its own former Caribbean outlet, while Britain maintained that it was always part of Mosquitia. In 1852, the protectorate granted self-governing autonomy to the tiny port. It was later bombarded and burned to the ground on July 13, 1854 by the US Navy sloop-of-war USS Cyane. Although this incident was historically minor, it had a major impact on American foreign policy.

The US Secretary of the Navy ordered Cyane's captain, George N. Hollins, to demand reparations from the town's residents for damaging property and stealing goods from an American-owned local steamboat business called the Accessory Transit Company (ATC). This company ran small steamers across the Nicaraguan Isthmus, picking up passengers at Greytown (sometimes spelled Grey Town) from Atlantic steamers out of US east coast ports and delivering them to Pacific steamers bound for San Francisco. This shortcut — which ran in both directions — eliminated the 10,000 mile, four- or five-month traditional route around South America.

Hollins was also to demand an apology for an insult to the US minister to Nicaragua, Solon Borland, when he visited the town two months earlier. At that time, the American captain of a transit company steamboat that Borland was traveling on had shot and killed a native boatman in cold blood. Borland later prevented the captain's arrest when he "took a gun from somebody, cocked it, and leveled" it at the Greytown's marshals. That night, an angry mob confronted Borland over his prevention of the murderer's arrest and a resident threw a piece of broken bottle at Borland, "slightly wounding him in the face".

Navy Secretary James Dobbin's orders to Hollins "hoped that you can affect the purposes of your visit without a resort to violence and destruction of property and loss of life". But Dobbin did not rule out force of arms. Hollins gave the town 24 hours to meet his reparations demands, mainly $24,000 (an estimated $840,000 in 2024 US dollars). When the small town was unable to satisfy his demands, Hollins bombarded the port with 177 rounds of cannon fire. Then he sent Marines ashore to burn down anything still standing. Because the residents had used those 24 hours to flee into the surrounding woods, no one was killed or injured in the razing.

== Background ==
In the first half of the 19th century, the US had been periodically at odds with Great Britain over their holdings and "interests" in Central America. These included British Honduras (later called Belize), the Bay Islands off Honduras, and Mosquitia. The latter included Greytown and what otherwise would have been the eastern halves of Honduras and Nicaragua. Ostensibly, the British set this up to protect the Miskito, with whom they had been trading for 200 years. "The Mosquito question", noted one U.S. diplomat, "has been a subject for discussion & negotiation for nearly two centuries. It is now questionable, to whom this insalubrious sweep of Country on the Atlantic belongs; while in view of our policy in regard to Indian tribes [insisting no Western Hemisphere Indians had sovereign rights to the land they occupied] the Protectorate of Mosquitia must be taken, as a shift & subterfuge".

The British claimed that since the Spanish had never conquered the Indians, their lands had not become part of Honduras and Nicaragua when those states freed themselves from Spanish rule. Later, in 1873, commenting bitterly on how this British claim became a de facto reality, then Secretary of State Hamilton Fish wrote that the 1860 Anglo-Nicaraguan Treaty of Managua "confirmed the grants of land previously made in Mosquito territory. The similar stipulation on this subject in the [1856 Anglo-American] Dallas-Clarendon [projet] Treaty was perhaps the most objectionable of any [in it], as it violated the cardinal rule of all European colonists in America, including Great Britain herself, that the aborigines had no title to the soil which they could confer upon individuals". This rule, Fish concluded, "has repeatedly been confirmed by judicial decisions, and especially by the Supreme Court of the United States".

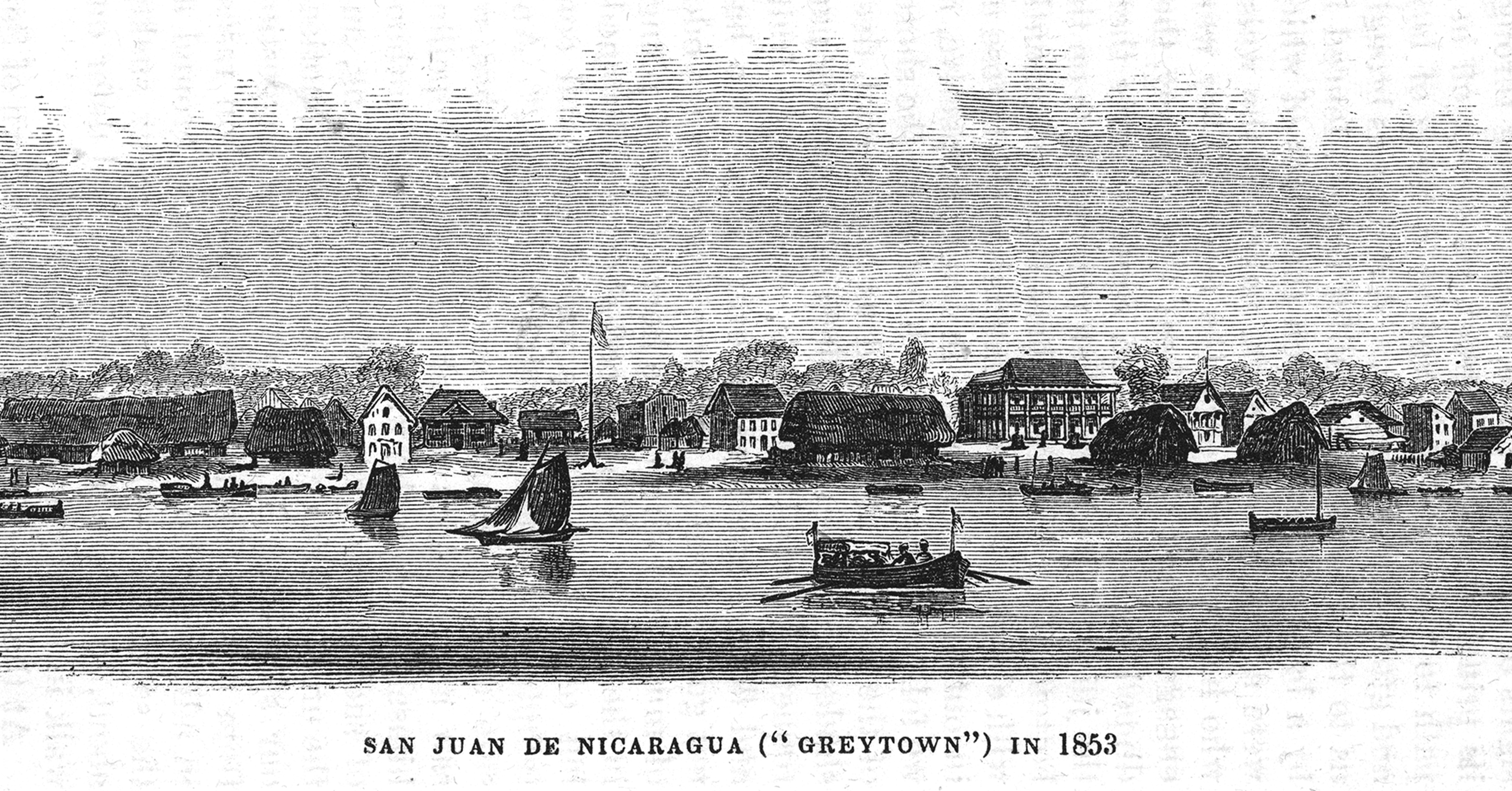
View of Greytown (Detail), 1853

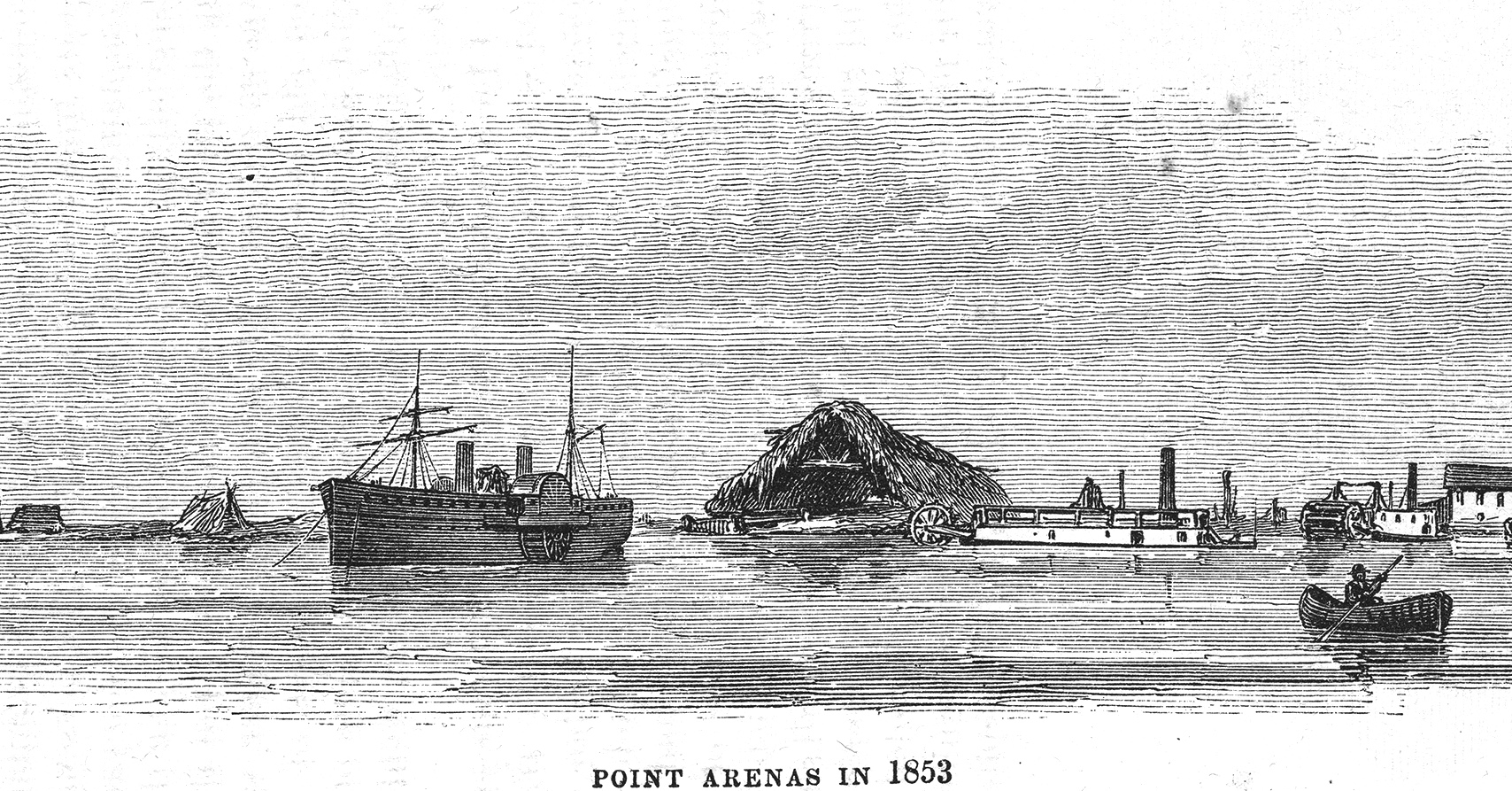
Punta Arenas (Detail), 1853

The U.S. had been comfortable dismissing the protectorate as a "subterfuge" until the British seized San Juan del Norte in 1848 and made it part of the protectorate, renaming it Grey Town, after their then-governor of Jamaica, Charles Edward Grey. The British wanted the port as a bargaining chip to prevent the United States from seizing the entire isthmian watercourse. Greytown Harbor and its appurtenances, San Juan del Norte [now Greytown] and Punta Arenas (part of Greytown, a large spit of land across the harbor), were the only possible sites for any water route's Atlantic terminus.

The recent American acquisitions of Texas and California made the British foreign secretary, Lord Palmerston, fear that the burgeoning young colossus would now turn south. According to American historian Mary Wilhelmine Williams, "The aggressive movement of the United States towards the southwest, accompanied by the talk of 'manifest destiny,' had given the British good reason to suspect the Americans of designs upon the territory of the isthmus, and to fear that they might attempt to monopolize the Nicaragua route". According to British historian Kenneth Bourne, "Neither side … aimed at exclusive control but each feared that this was, in fact, the other's real intention".

Between 1849 and 1853, six events insulated Greytown from becoming any direct focus of antagonisms that lingered between the US and British governments. In 1849, the U.S. chargé d'affairs in Central America (posted to Nicaragua), E.G. Squier, negotiated a canal-building agreement between the government of Nicaragua and Cornelius Vanderbilt, one of the richest men in America, and an owner of a huge fleet of steam vessels. (He was given 12 years to build a canal; in the interim he could run the previously mentioned steamboats across the isthmus.) In 1850, the Anglo-American Clayton-Bulwer Treaty had both sides agreeing not to "obtain or maintain" exclusive control of the canal, and it would be available on a neutral basis for all shipping. In 1851, Vanderbilt's inland steamboat company, the Accessory Transit Company (ATC), leased Punta Arenas for a nominal fee from the Mosquito Protectorate as the Atlantic terminus for their river steamboats. As noted previously, in 1852 Greytown became an autonomous city, and continued to lease Punta Arenas to the ATC for the same nominal fee. Also in 1852, and again in 1853, Anglo-American agreements recognized Greytown's new status (at least temporarily, until a new treaty with Nicaragua might settle the city's future permanently. This occurred with the Treaty of Managua in 1860 when Greytown became a part of Nicaragua.)

But by 1853 there was bad blood between Greytown and the ATC. The company refused to let its passengers visit Greytown, thus denying the town merchants their hoped-for customers and igniting what Harper's New Monthly Magazine called "a mortal feud" between town and company.

Greytown canceled the ATC's lease to Punta Arenas and offered liberal terms for the company to move into Greytown proper, so the merchants would have access to the passengers as customers. The ATC refused to move and continued keeping passengers out of Greytown. When asked by Secretary of State William Marcy about Punta Arenas, the transit company's chief council, J. L. White, said they leased it not from Greytown but from Nicaragua. This was untrue, but Marcy believed White and sent Hollins and the Cyane in March 1853 — about 16 months before the razing visit — to prevent Greytown from evicting the ATC from Punta Arenas.

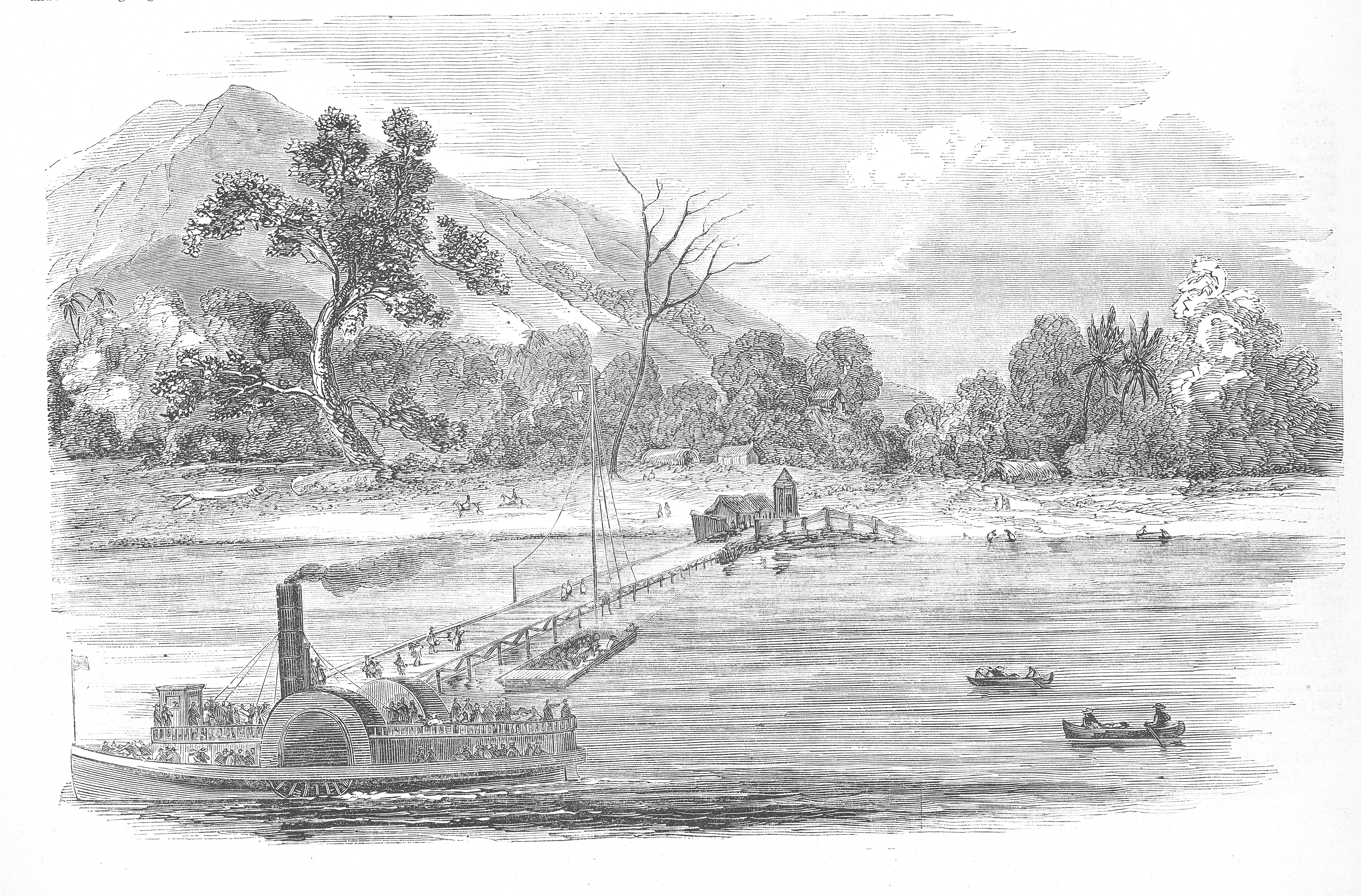
A lake steamer at Granada in western Nicaragua, c. 1856

In July, after this intervention prevented the eviction, the British informed Marcy that, on June 11, 1851, the transit company had made a written request of Greytown — not Nicaragua — "to the effect that the Company desired the use of a portion of the land on the other side of the harbour" and that "the Government of Greytown had ceded that portion of land to the Company at a nominal rent, until the land in question might be required for the purposes of the Mosquito Government. This agreement", the British continued, "therefore clearly shows that the Accessory Transit Company considered the land in question as dependent on Greytown, and that they were bound to evacuate it whenever required by the Government of Greytown. They were so required in February last, and refused; and the United States' commander not only supported them in that refusal, but landed an armed force to protect them against the authorities of Greytown".

When Marcy heard this, he berated White: "I defended the conduct of Capt. Hollins in landing his Marines to protect the property of the transit company on the ground that the people of Greytown had no right to Punta Arenas. I felt safe in taking this position on account of what you said to me on that subject".

About 10 months later, when he learned of the broken-bottle assault on Borland and of a recent, purported theft of food from the company by residents (compounding the earlier property damage), Marcy sent Hollins and the Cyane back to Greytown, under Navy Secretary Dobbin's orders noted above.

Upon arrival, Hollins met with the only US diplomat assigned to the port, Commercial Agent Joseph W. Fabens. Hollins and Fabens decided to demand $8,000 (an estimated $280,000 in 2024) for the damage done to the transit company's property (one or two small buildings destroyed, a precursor to the thwarted eviction) and $16,000 (an estimated $560,000 in 2024) for basic food stuffs, like flour, cornmeal, etc., allegedly stolen in a longboat (or "yawl"). The theft of so much food was unlikely in a boat only 20 to 30 feet long, which also contained four people. (The boat was recovered.) The total compensation of $24,000 (as noted above, about $840,000 in 2024 dollars) was demanded of the approximate 500 Greytown residents in only 24 hours. It was not forthcoming because the townsfolk did not have such money. Like the money, the apology to Borland was not forthcoming either; the entire city council had resigned over Borland's usurpation of the town's authority when he prevented the steamboat captain's arrest for murder. They also resigned to protest his hiring of 50 Americans to remain on Punta Arenas as an armed, ersatz constabulary to guard the transit company and its employees.

Besides Secretary Dobbin's orders, Hollins and Fabens may have also been influenced by a letter to Fabens from the chief counsel of the Accessory Transit Company, J. L. White:

Captain Hollins leaves here next Monday. You will see from his instructions that much discretion is given to you, and it is to be hoped that it will not be so exercised as to show any mercy to the town or people. If the scoundrels are soundly punished, we can take possession and build it up as a business place, put in our own officers, transfer the jurisdiction, and you know the rest. It is of the last importance that the people of the town should be taught to fear us. Punishment will teach them, after which you must agree with them as to the organization of a new government and the officers of it. Everything now depends on you and Hollins. The latter is all right. He fully understands the outrage and will not hesitate in enforcing reparations.

== Anglo-American war of words ==
On the day before the Cyane razed Greytown, a much smaller Royal Navy schooner, HBMS Bermuda, was also anchored in the harbor, commanded by a Lieutenant W. D. Jolley. He only essayed a half-hearted complaint of Hollins's plans: "The force under my command is so totally inadequate … against the Cyane, I can only enter this my protest". Hollins responded with: "I … sincerely regret … exceedingly [that] the force under your command is not doubly equal to that of the Cyane".

== Aftermath ==
Despite both US and international outrage at the bombardment, the US government ignored the incident until President Franklin Pierce finally offered an official explanation five months later in his State of the Union message: "The arrogant contumacy of the offenders rendered it impossible to avoid the alternative either to break up their establishment or to leave them impressed with the idea that they might persevere with impunity in a career of insolence and plunder".

Some newspapers supported the president and the razing. The New-York Evening Post styled the proceeding "a great naval victory". The Post added, "It was probably the first place that was ever taken after a bombardment, whether by land or by sea, without the loss of life on either side. In that point of view, the fall of Greytown will doubtless cover with additional glory the military portion of the Administration, under whose auspices it was achieved". [Reprinted in The Liberator.]

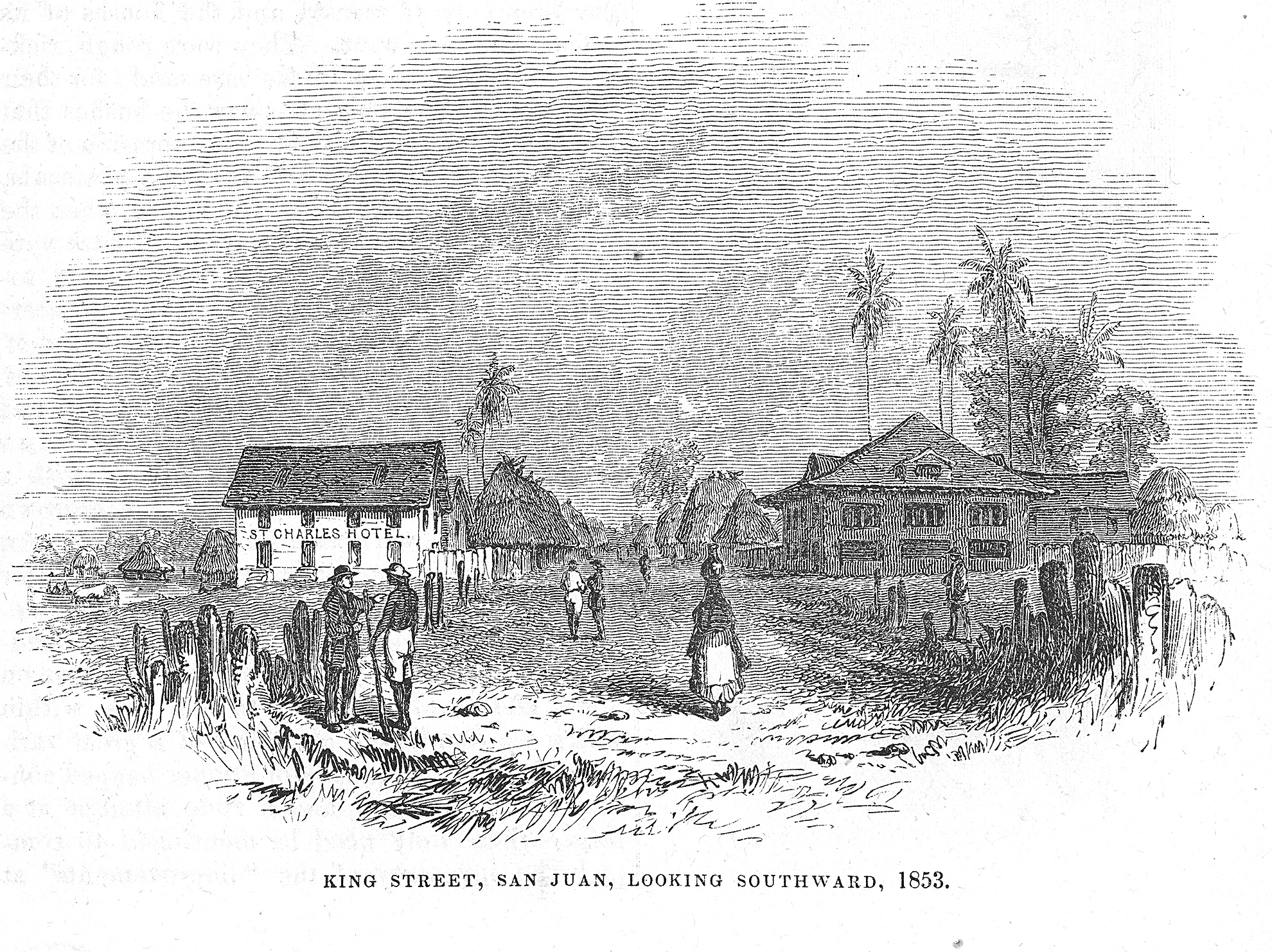
King Street, Greytown, looking southward, 1853

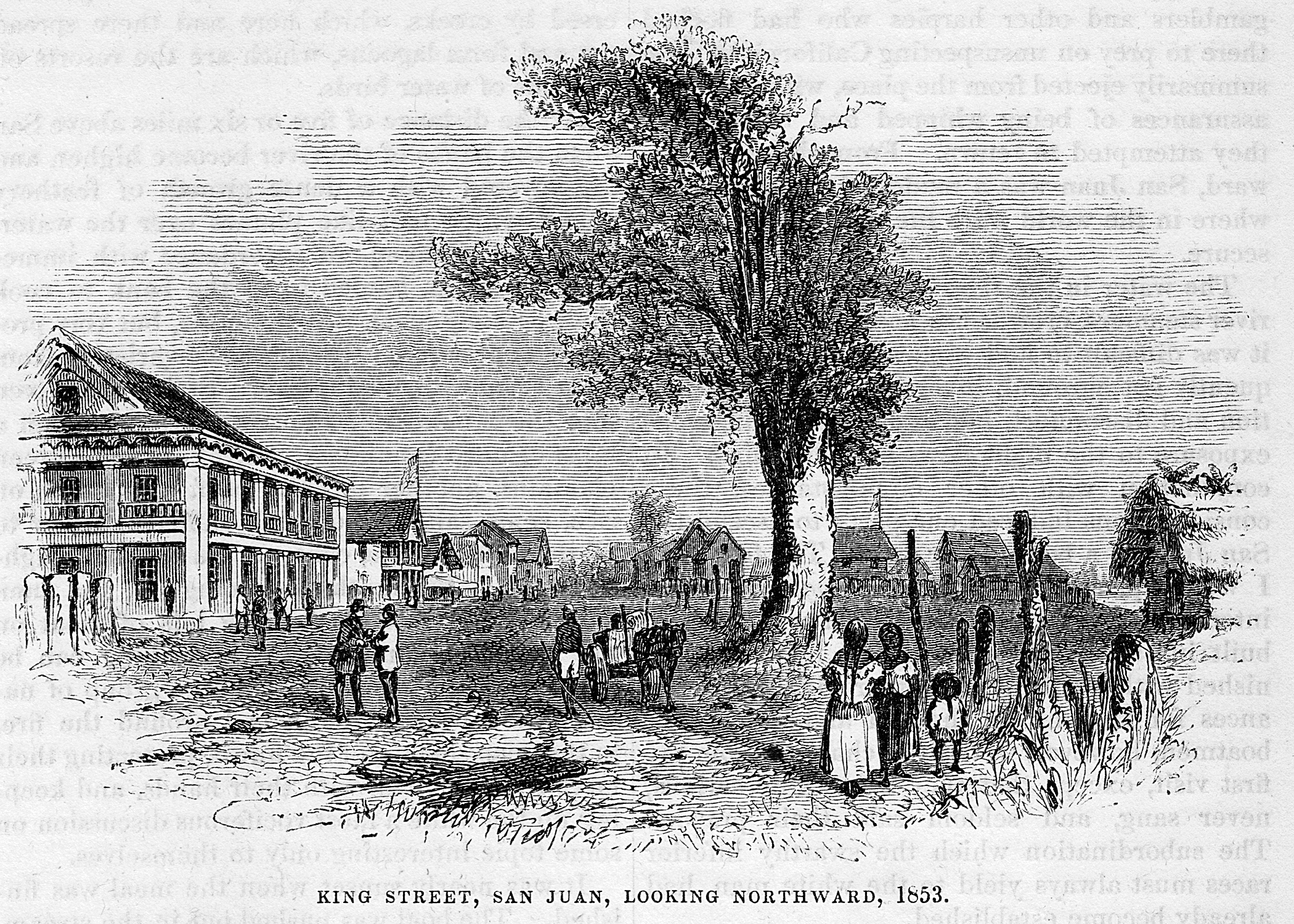
King Street, Greytown, looking northward, 1853

Two months after Greytown's destruction, the Nashville Tennessean noted that local Democrats in Massachusetts resolved it was "proof to the world that the Administration is determined to … protect our citizens from injury and insult".

But most papers were opposed. And less than two weeks after the razing, the New-York Tribune proffered these alternative explanations for why the port was destroyed: "That [U.S.-owned steamboat] company [had] long desired to get rid of the town, which … was a hindrance to their supremacy and had defied their power. [Greytown] also stood in the way of a great project for the establishment of a colony … which is entertained by several speculators and for which they have a [Mosquito Indian land] grant…. The town being removed, it is supposed that project may be carried out with greater facility".

And in late 1853 — seven months before the razing — the New-York Herald had reported that an American named David Keeling bought one-quarter of a huge tract of land from the king of Mosquitia and another quarter of it from him, earlier, in 1851. (Basically a figurehead, the British allowed the Indian king this power over protectorate lands — with some oversight.) "We have lately learned", the Herald continued, "that Mr. Keeling has associated with him, for the purpose of improving the lands embraced in these grants, several gentlemen in Virginia, Pennsylvania, and New York, and that measures are now being taken to forward the enterprise".

Then on January 5, 1854, the New-York Times seconded this Herald report with: "The Mosquito King … has sold out to a Company of American citizens one half of the entire territory over which he claims to exercise dominion. The [land-grant] Company (of which Senator [James] Cooper, of Pennsylvania, is a member) has purchased 35,000 square miles for $50,000! [about $1.75 million in 2024.]"

American newspaper stories like this, which were sparse before the razing, became more plentiful after it, with many papers, like the New-York Times, lauding the colonization scheme as a way for the US to establish a foothold in Central America that might inevitably see it become a US sphere of influence: "If this enterprise is carried forward", the Times wrote, ... its political results will necessarily be very important. Central America is destined to occupy an influential position in the family of nations if her advantages ... are availed of by a race of 'Northmen,' who shall supplant the tainted, mongrel and decaying race which now curses it so fearfully. That the influence of [the enterprise] ... will speedily spread itself all over Nicaragua and absorb the whole of that State with its inefficient Government, there can be little doubt".

These twin intrigues against the town (the transit company and the land-speculators were in league early on) both eventually failed and largely disappeared from the written narrative. Historians came to rely on official government accounts when these newspaper stories faded from memory. Perhaps the last historian who still had sources on at least one of these sub rosa plots was the distinguished William O. Scroggs, who wrote in 1916: "It was to the interest of that [steamboat] corporation that Greytown be wiped off the map, and it had succeeded in inveigling the [US] government into doing this bit of dirty work. … It was rumored, too, that the Transit Company was maturing a scheme to rebuild Greytown for its own profit".

(Only in the last 15 to 20 years, when 19th Century newspapers, books and documents became word-searchable on the internet, did these hitherto untraceable machinations against Greytown re-emerge from the depths of the mid-1800s print record.)

== Government record ==
In 1912, the State Department's solicitor, J. Reuben Clark, wrote a memorandum entitled, The Right to Protect Citizens in Foreign Countries by Landing Forces. In it, he listed "47 instances in which force had been used, in most of them without any congressional authorization". The list included Greytown and his description hewed closely to the official US line. Captain Hollins was instructed, he wrote, to "obtain reparation for the company's losses as well as for the indignity to Mr. Borland. Demands for an apology and indemnity were duly made on the local de facto authorities, but they were not answered".

In the current version of the official US list of interventions, which originated in 1945 and was then called "Instances of Use of US Armed Forces Abroad, 1798-1945", the unanswered company-loss reparation was dropped and only the unanswered Borland-insult remained as justification for the razing: "Naval forces bombarded and burned San Juan del Norte (Greytown) to avenge an insult to the American Minister to Nicaragua". And it has continued to appear in this list's subsequent iterations right up to the latest one at this writing, dated: June 7, 2023".

== Foreign policy legacy ==
When the Cyane returned from Greytown, it landed at Boston, where Hollins was ordered to leave the ship and travel to New York City, where "you have been arrested". A New York merchant named Calvin Durand, who had lost large amounts of goods in the bombardment and burning, sued Hollins personally for $14,000 (about $490,000 in 2024).

The case, Durand v. Hollins, was finally decided on September 13, 1860. Presiding was a U.S. Supreme Court justice named Samuel Nelson, who, like every justice at the time, was, for part of each year, "riding the circuit", that is, hearing federal circuit court cases. (This practice was abandoned in 1891.) Durand's lawyer argued that Hollins had acted illegally because he basically waged war against Greytown without prior approval of Congress, upon which the Constitution had bestowed the exclusive power to declare war. As the New York Journal of Commerce put it: "The case … involves a number of interesting questions, and especially the broad one of the constitutional power of the President to order the bombardment and destruction of a town in a foreign country without the authority of Congress, which body holds the war-making power". (Reprinted in the Nashville Union and American.)

Nelson decided for the captain. He found that, in acting against those who had damaged or stolen material wealth belonging to Americans at Greytown without suitable compensation and against those who insulted an American envoy without offering suitable apology, Hollins was an "authorized agent" of the president. And, "as the executive head of the nation,

the president is made the only legitimate organ of the general government, to open and carry on, correspondence or negotiations with foreign nations, in matters concerning the interests of the country or of its citizens. It is to him, also, the citizens abroad must look for protection of person and of property, and for the faithful execution of the laws existing and intended for their protection. For this purpose, the whole executive power of the country is placed in his hands, under the Constitution. Now, as it respects the interposition of the executive abroad, for the protection of the lives or property of the citizen, the duty must, of necessity, rest in the discretion of the president. Under our system of government, the citizen abroad is as much entitled to protection as the citizen at home. The great object and duty of Government is the protection of the lives, liberty, and property of the people composing it, whether abroad or at home; and any government failing in the accomplishment of the object, or the performance of the duty, is not worth preserving."

Justice Nelson went on to say that President Pierce intervened "for the protection of the [American] citizens at Greytown against an irresponsible and marauding community that had established itself there".

In similar language, President Pierce, in his State of the Union referenced above, wrote of the Greytowners: "At first pretending to act as the subjects of the fictitious sovereign of the Mosquito Indians, they … assumed to adopt a distinct political organization [again, as noted earlier, Greytown was at this time an autonomous city-state, acknowledged as legitimate by both the US and England] … Not standing before the world in the attitude of an organized political society, … it was, in fact, a marauding establishment … [and] a piratical resort of outlaws".

As historian Arthur Schlesinger said of Greytown (and, by extension, Durand v. Hollins) in his 1973 book, the Imperial Presidency, "both Pierce and even Nelson himself said with the utmost clarity that the action was undertaken, not against a sovereign state, but against a 'piratical' and 'irresponsible' group. Nevertheless this ... generally wretched episode was cited in later years by lawyers in desperate search of constitutional justification for presidential war against sovereign states". (Schlesinger may have been echoing noted expert in international law and long-time state department official John Bassett Moore. Moore argued in 1921 that the Greytown incident should not serve as precedent for an expansion of presidential war power. Moore said the administration represented Greytown as "a community claiming to exist outside the bounds of any recognized state or political entity, and the legality of the action taken against it was defended by President Pierce and Secretary Marcy on that express ground".)

The first significant enunciation of this concept — of Durand justifying "presidential war", i.e., obviating the need for congressional approval of an act of war — may have come in 1940. Edward S. Corwin, the first chairman of the Department of Politics at Princeton, wrote in his classic book, The President: Office and Powers: "Far more important is the question whether the President may, without authorization by Congress, take measures which are technically acts of war in protection of American rights and interests abroad. The answer returned both by practice and by judicial doctrine is yes. The leading precedent was an outgrowth of the bombardment in 1854, by Lieutenant [sic] Hollins of the U.S.S. Cyane, of Greytown".

In 1987, for instance, Fred F. Manget, a member of the Senior Intelligence Service and a former Deputy General Counsel of the Central Intelligence Agency, wrote that "the President … has the power to order military intervention in foreign countries to protect American citizens and property without prior congressional approval. The theory has been cited to justify about 200 instances of use of force abroad in the last 200 years. The theory was given legal sanction in a case [Durand] arising from the bombardment of a Nicaraguan port by order of the President in 1854".

And in 2019, Matthew Waxman, a Columbia Law School professor and former senior policy staffer at the State Department, Defense Department, and National Security Council, wrote of the Durand v. Hollins case law: "If the United States launches limited strikes against Iran, I will not be surprised if the Justice Department cites this case in its justification".

== Post-bombardment Central America ==
In early 1856 President Pierce named a minister to England to negotiate a new bilateral Central American treaty with Foreign Secretary Lord Clarendon. Pierce appointed George Mifflin Dallas, who was a former vice president and former minister to Russia. When Dallas and Clarendon began working on the projet treaty, the British regarded U.S. hegemony over Central America as inevitable and hoped the treaty would provide them with a graceful means to exit the region, while retaining British Honduras (now Belize). (This general retreat might be regarded as a de facto British acknowledgment of the Monroe doctrine.) The British also wanted — and got — a process built into this draft treaty for affirming the validity of land grants in the Mosquito Protectorate. The treaty never went into effect, but the English would get their land grant guarantees three years later.

By 1859, British opinion was also no longer supportive of their nation's presence in the Mosquito Coast. In the Wyke-Cruz Treaty of that year, the British government agreed to return Honduras's Bay Islands and ceded the northern part of the Mosquito Coast to Honduras. In a separate agreement signed that same year—the Wyke–Aycinena Treaty—Britain and Guatemala negotiated the boundary of British Honduras. Although the treaty affirmed British control over the territory, Guatemala later disputed its validity, and continued to challenge British claims to Belize well into the late twentieth century. The next year, 1860, Britain signed the Treaty of Managua, ceding the rest of the Mosquito Coast to Nicaragua, except for insisting on a reservation for the Mosquito Indians and protection for any land grants made by them. (They had also secured such land grant protection from the Hondurans the year before.)

In his fourth state-of-the-union, President Buchanan said he found the 1859 and 1860 treaties with Honduras and Nicaragua respectively "entirely satisfactory". However, the Digest of International Law of the United States, writing about the Nicaraguan treaty (but whose words could apply as well to that with the Hondurans), said: "President Buchanan's expressions of satisfaction … were based on the assumption that Great Britain had ceased to exercise any influence whatever over the Mosquito country. That this is not the case, however, follows from the ratification, by the treaty, of British [land grant] titles from Indians … giving British subjects a controlling power in the territory".

== Greytown's ultimate fate ==
Although rebuilt by the British, Greytown was never the same. In 1855, improvements in the Panamanian route, including a robust new railroad, started making it a viable alternative to the Nicaraguan route. On July 26, 1859, a long time resident, W.P. Kirkland, wrote a friend that "the entire river, from Greytown to the Colorado (River), is filling up [with silt]. … We are now without hope of either Canal or Transit, with a certainty of poverty". On November 17, Kirkland reported that property in the town was selling for 15 percent of its cost and that the population was swiftly melting away. Memorials (petitions) from the aggrieved residents, wrote historian Robert Seager, "arguing that the Accessory Transit Company had maliciously produced the bombardment by misrepresenting the peaceful and cooperative nature of the Greytowners, failed to stir the Congress".
