= Bea Evenson Fountain =

Fountain in San Diego, California, U.S.

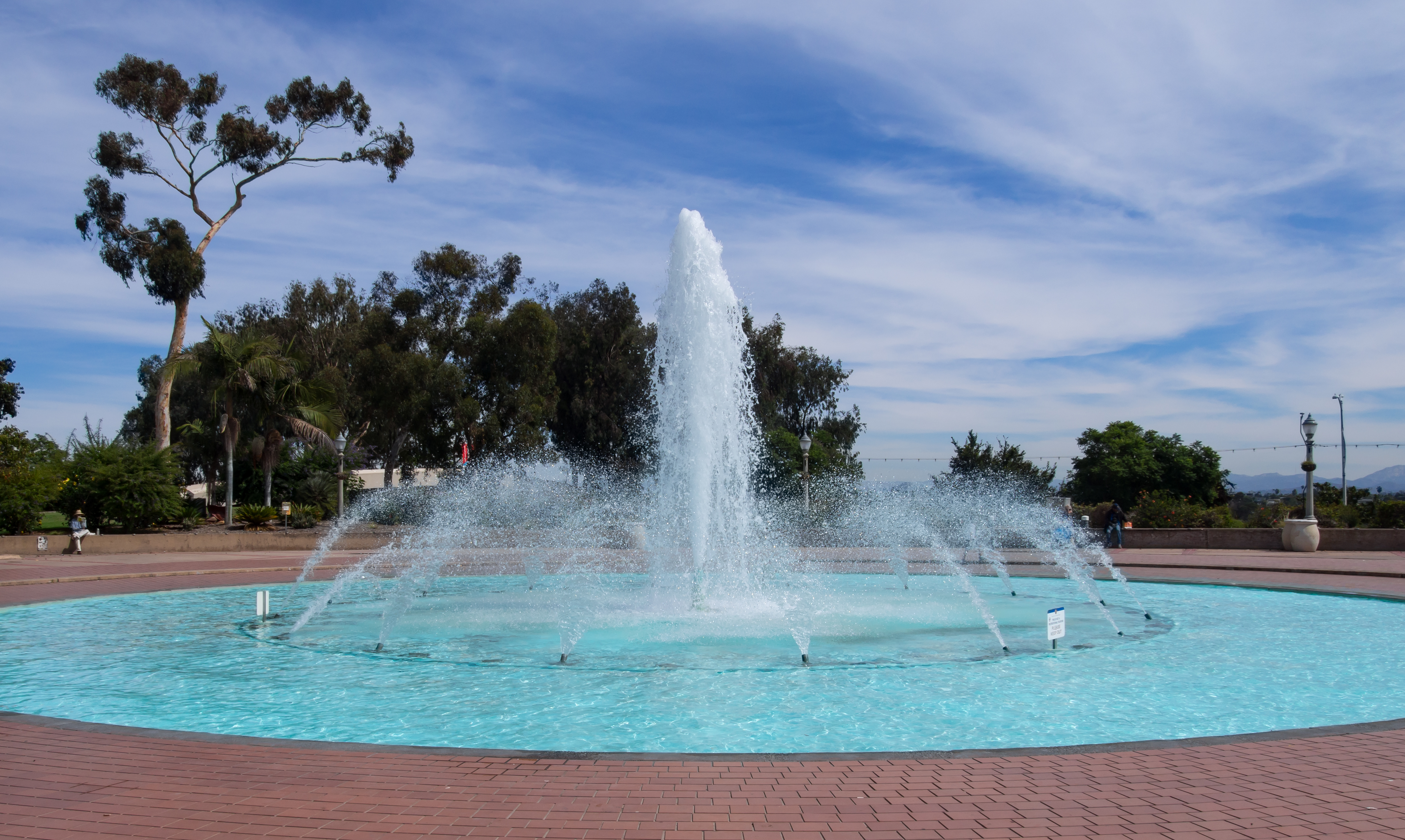
- The fountain in 2016
- Artist: Homer Delawie
- Location: San Diego
- 32°43′53″N 117°08′49″W

Bea Evenson Fountain is an outdoor fountain in San Diego's Balboa Park, in the U.S. state of California.

Designed by noted modernist architect Homer Delawie, the fountain honors Bea Evenson (1900–1981), the founding president of the park's Committee of 100, organized in the late 1960s to save or reconstruct the buildings of the Panama–California Exposition of 1915.

Built in 1972 on the Plaza de Balboa, the fountain was dedicated to Evenson in May 1981.
