= Accessory Transit Company =

Company transporting potential prospectors during the 1850s California Gold Rush

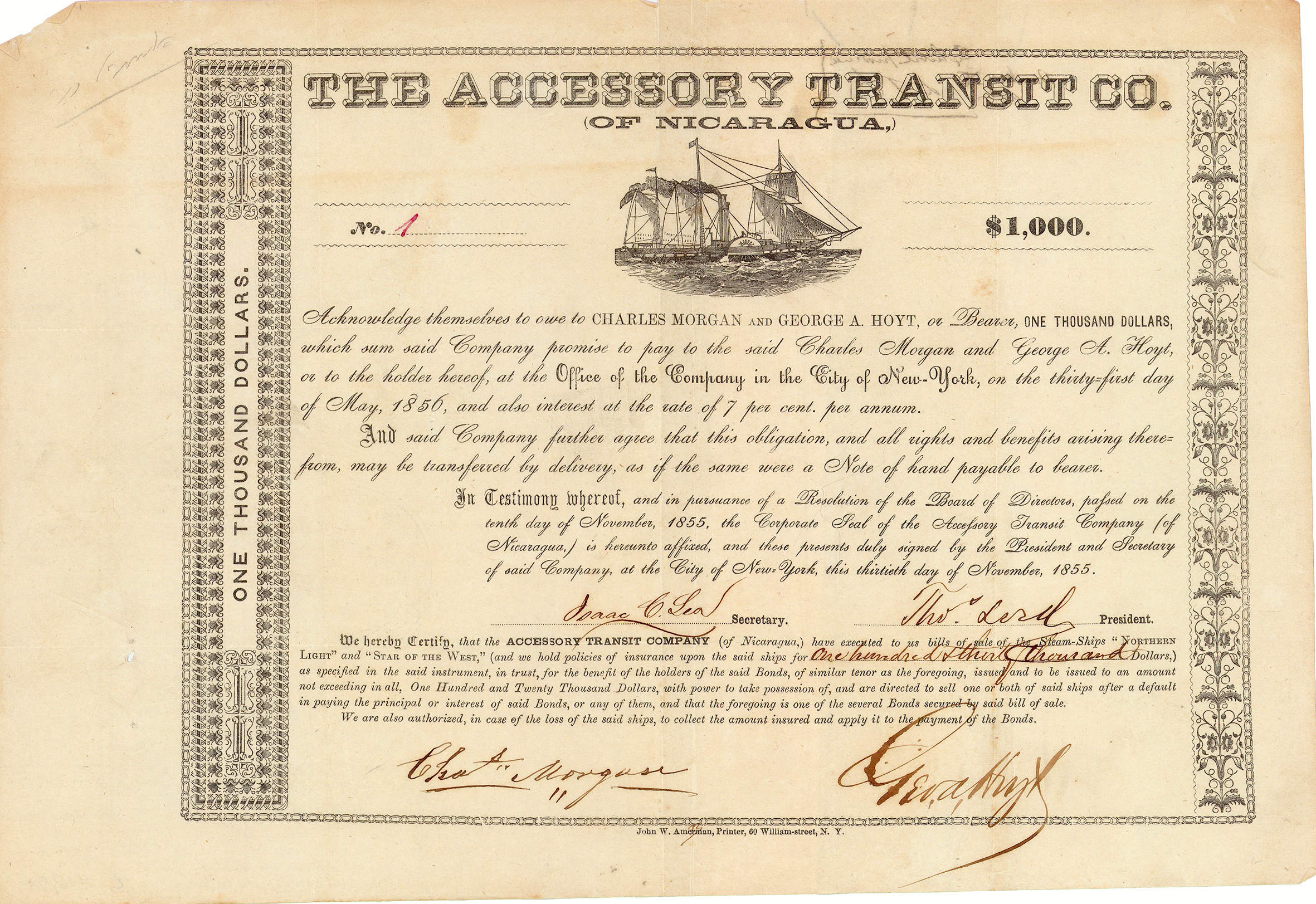
Bond of the Accessory Transit Company (of Nicaragua), issued 30 November 1855, signed by Charles Morgan

The Accessory Transit Company was a company set up by Cornelius Vanderbilt and others during the California Gold Rush in the 1850s, to transport would-be prospectors from the east coast of the United States to the west coast.

At the time, an overland journey across the US was an arduous undertaking and could last many weeks. The Accessory Transit Company instead took passengers by steamer from New York to Grey Town in Mosquitia. From there, they travelled up the Rio San Juan to Lake Nicaragua, crossing the lake to the town of Rivas. A stagecoach then crossed the narrow isthmus to San Juan del Sur, where another steamer travelled to San Francisco.

The ATC provided the cheapest route to California from the east coast, and was soon carrying 2,000 passengers a month at a fare of $300 each (equivalent to about $11,300 in modern money), later reduced to $150. The wealth generated by the route attracted efforts to take it over, and in 1854 the US Navy bombarded San Juan del Norte in response to demands from the town authorities that the company vacate their premises immediately.

In 1855, the filibuster William Walker installed himself as President of Nicaragua, taking over the ATC's assets in the country in the process; he was ousted in 1857 by forces backed by Vanderbilt. Having regained control of the ATC, Vanderbilt approached the Pacific Mail Steamship Company and the United States Mail Steamship Company, which operated routes across Panama, and offered to stop running the Nicaragua route in return for a $40,000 monthly stipend. The companies accepted this offer, and a year later increased the stipend to $56,000 when Vanderbilt threatened to reopen the Transit line, but the ATC did not run again.

Vanderbilt's original contract with the Nicaraguan government allowing him to operate the ATC also gave him exclusive rights to construct a Nicaragua Canal until 1861. In the event, political instabilities in Nicaragua as well as its frequent volcanic eruptions conspired to make Panama a more attractive location for a trans-Central American canal.
