= Fort Guijarros =

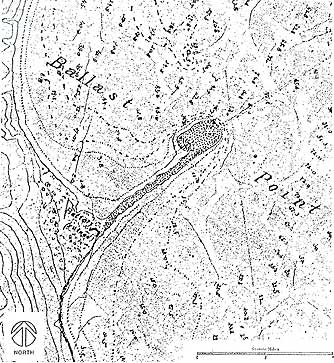
- San Diego Bay, California. “Battery (ruined)”; Enlarged detail of the tracing on the plan table sheet of San Diego Bay, California. Survey by A.M. Harrison. Source: U.S. Coast Survey, 1851.
- Interactive map of Fort Guijarros
- Location: Ballast Point, San Diego, California
- Coordinates: 32.67°N 117.241944°W

California Historical Landmark
- Reference no.: 69

San Diego Historic Landmark
- Designated: November 6, 1980
- Reference no.: 27

Fort Guijarros (Spanish "Castillo de Guijarros" ) was a Spanish fort in what is now San Diego, California, United States. Its name means "Fort Cobblestones" in English. It was built in 1797 on Ballast Point as the first defensive fortifications for San Diego Bay. It was involved in the Battle of San Diego, a naval battle between the fort and an American trading vessel. The site is registered as California Historical Landmark #69.

== Structure and location ==
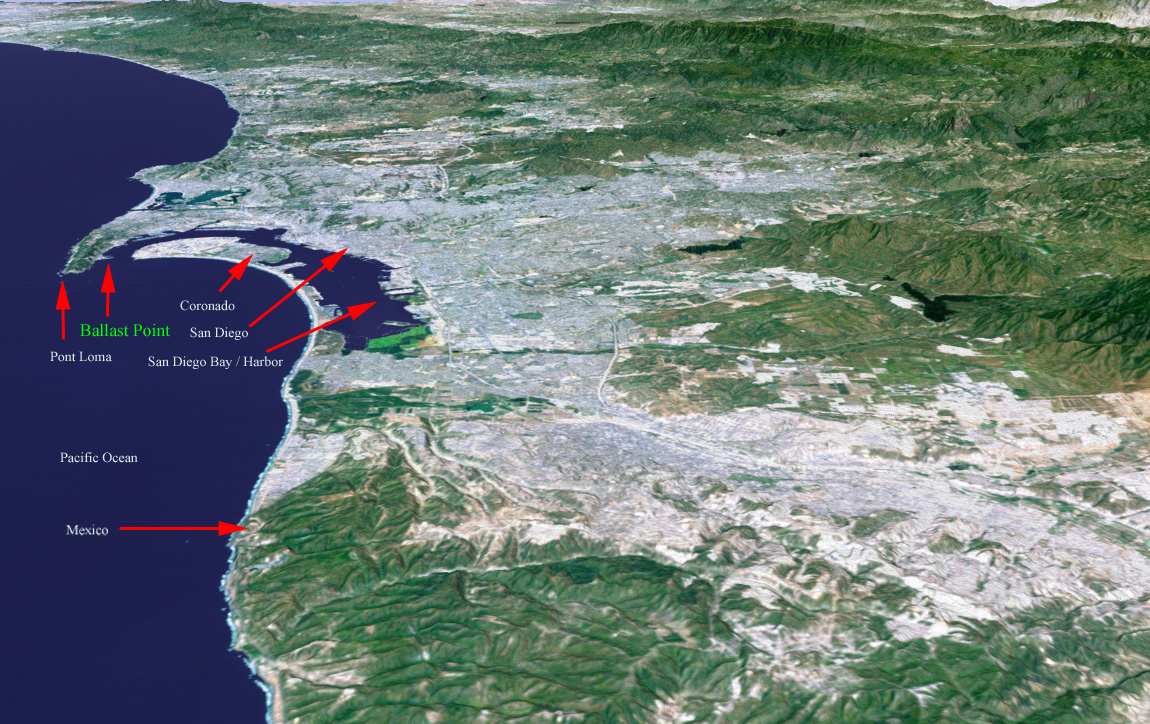
Ballast Point and surrounding area, February 2000

Fort Guijarros was made out of adobe and it had ten cannons mounted in gun emplacements. At least two of the guns survive. One of them, "El Jupiter", was previously at Fort Stockton and is now in the collection of the San Diego History Center. "El Capitan" is located in San Diego Viejo Plaza.

The fort was built in 1797 as the first defensive fortifications for San Diego harbor. It commanded the entrance to San Diego Bay from a rise at the base of Ballast Point at Point Loma. In 1796 the Spanish named the point "Punta de los Guijarros", which means "point of the cobblestones". The fort's English name is "Fort Cobblestones". The point derived the name Ballast Point from the fact that the early Yankee skippers would have stones gathered from Ballast Point to serve as ballast in their ships during their returns around Cape Horn to their home town, Boston.

== History ==
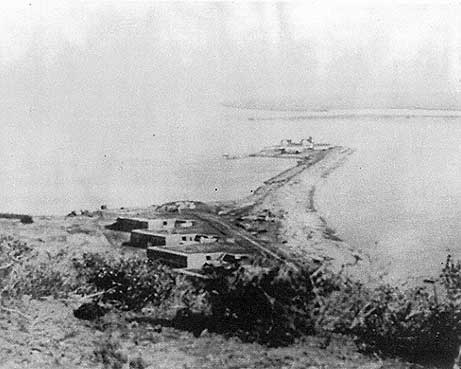
View from Point Loma looking East over Fort Rosecrans and Ballast Point. The ruins of Fort Guijarros would be to the right of the largest gun battery of Fort Rosecrans, Battery Wilkeson.

The ten guns of the fort were fired in action only twice. The first time was in 1803 during the Battle of San Diego. The Spanish had detained the American brig Lelia Byrd in San Diego Harbor for smuggling otter skins. The ship's crew overpowered their Spanish captors and were headed out of the harbor when the guns of the fort sought to prevent her escape. Fire from the Lelia Byrd's guns drove the fort's gunners to seek cover.

The fort again fired on an American smuggler in 1828. This time, the fort was under Mexican control and the vessel was the Franklin.

In 1846, during the Mexican American War, the American ship USS Cyane landed American Marines at nearby La Playa. The marines took abandoned guns from Fort Guijarros and used them to lay siege to Old Town San Diego.

In 1873 the United States Army took over Ballast Point and built gun batteries for the defense of San Diego as Fort Rosecrans. These installations were maintained through World War I and World War II. A lighthouse known as the Ballast Point Light was built on Ballast Point in 1890 and survived until 1957. In 1962 the United States Navy built a submarine base on Ballast Point as home port for the Pacific Fleet's nuclear attack submarines. The Fort Guijarros Museum Foundation conducts archeological digs and historical research into the history of Ballast Point.
