= USS Cyane (1837) =

Sloops-of-war of the United States Navy

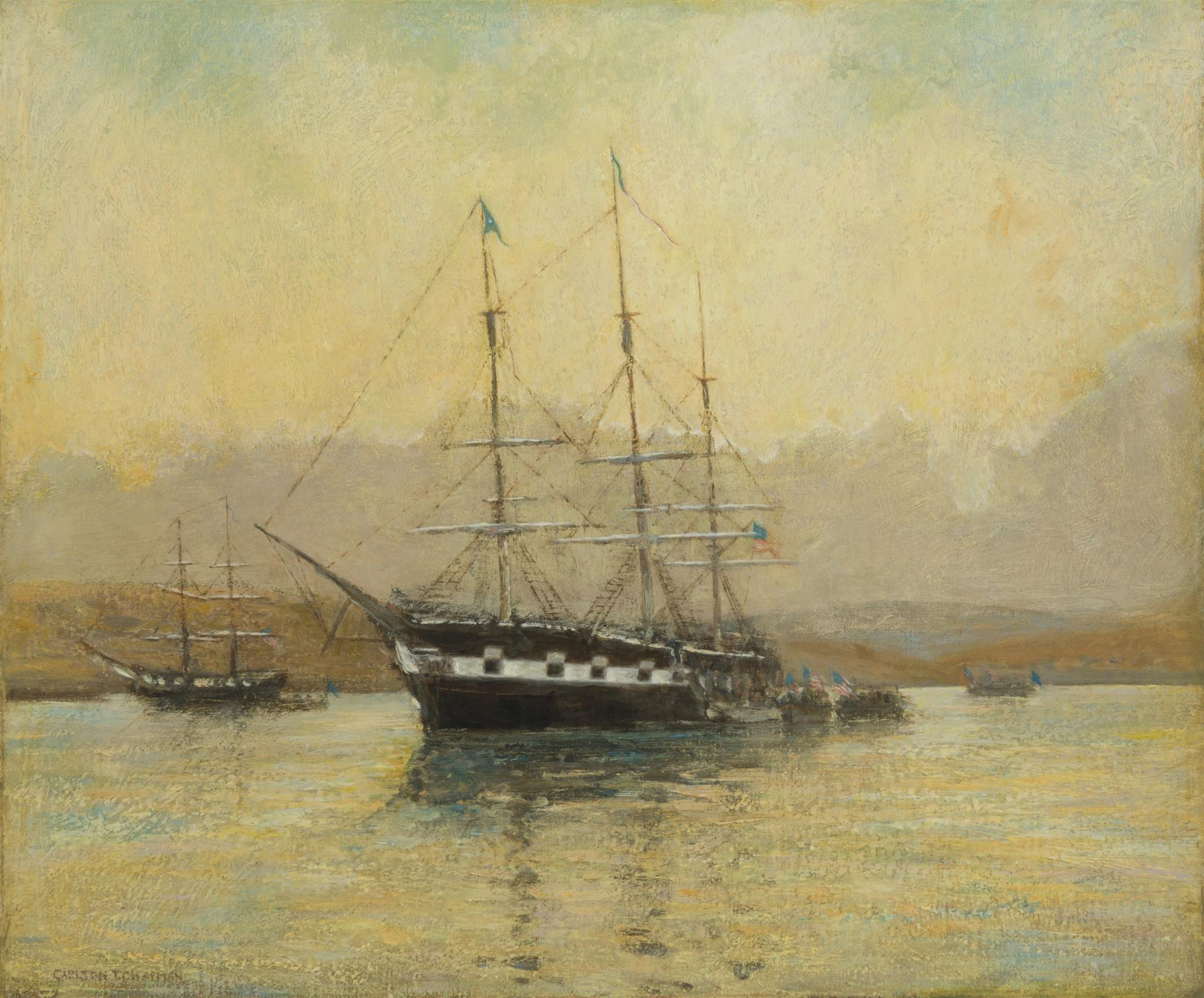
- USS Cyane"USS Cyane Taking Possession of San Diego Old Town July 1846", by Carlton T. Chapman

History

United States
- Name: USS Cyane
- Builder: Boston Navy Yard
- Launched: 2 December 1837
- Commissioned: May 1838
- Decommissioned: 20 September 1871
- Fate: Sold, 30 July 1887

General characteristics
- Type: Sloop-of-war
- Tonnage: 792
- Length: 132 ft 4 in (40.34 m)
- Beam: 26 ft 3 in (8.00 m)
- Draft: 16 ft 6 in (5.03 m)
- Propulsion: Sails
- Complement: 200 officers and enlisted
- Armament: 18 × 32-pounder guns; 4 × 24-pounder guns

The second USS Cyane was a sloop-of-war in the United States Navy during the Mexican–American War.

Cyane was launched on 2 December 1837 by Boston Navy Yard. She was commissioned in May 1838, with Commander John Percival in command.

She sailed on 24 June 1838 for duty in the Mediterranean, returning to Norfolk, Virginia 16 May 1841. She cleared 1 November 1841 for the Pacific Squadron, returning 1 October 1844. Sailing again for the Pacific 10 August 1845 with Passed Midshipman Benjamin F. B. Hunter as her Sailing Master, Cyane served on the west coast during the Mexican War. On 7 July 1846 her commanding officer, Captain William Mervine, led a detachment of Marines and sailors from Commodore John D. Sloat's squadron ashore at Monterey, California, hoisting the American flag at the Customs House and claiming possession of the city and all of present-day California.

On 26 July 1846 Lieutenant Colonel John C. Frémont's California Battalion boarded Cyane, now under the command of Commander Samuel Francis Du Pont, and the ship sailed for San Diego, California on 29 July 1846. She landed Marines at nearby La Playa, where they were warmly welcomed by the largely pro-American civilian population. The Marines took abandoned guns from Fort Guijarros and used them to lay siege to Old Town San Diego. A detachment of Marines and sailors from Cyane took possession of the town, raising the American flag. They were followed by the Fremont volunteers and Cyane's detachment returned aboard to sail for San Blas, where a landing party destroyed a Mexican battery on 2 September.

Entering the Gulf of California, Cyane seized La Paz and burned the small fleet at Guaymas. Within a month, she cleared the Gulf of hostile ships, destroying or capturing 30 vessels. In company with Independence and Congress, she captured the town of Mazatlán, Mexico, 11 November 1847. On 22 January 1848, she arrived off San José del Cabo to relieve the besieged garrison there. She landed a force of about 100 men who fought the final engagement and broke the Mexican siege. She returned to Norfolk 9 October 1848 to receive the congratulations of the Secretary of the Navy for her significant contributions to American victory in Mexico.

Between 9 October 1851 and 24 June 1852, Cyane sailed in the Home Squadron, rejoining it on 10 October 1852 to cruise constantly on the Atlantic coast and in the Caribbean from Nova Scotia to Aspinwall for the protection of American citizens. She bombarded and destroyed Greytown, Mosquitia on 13 July 1854, in retaliation for an incident where local protesters had thrown a broken bottle at Solon Borland. On 3 June 1857, the Cyane retrieved from Greytown more than 150 filibusters who surrendered with William Walker at Rivas, Nicaragua, on 1 May, some of whom had their families with them. The ship afterward protected the disputed fisheries along the coast of Nova Scotia from 2 September to 30 October 1857. She sailed for Haiti 19 November 1857 and joined a special expedition surveying the Isthmus of Darien as a possible canal site.

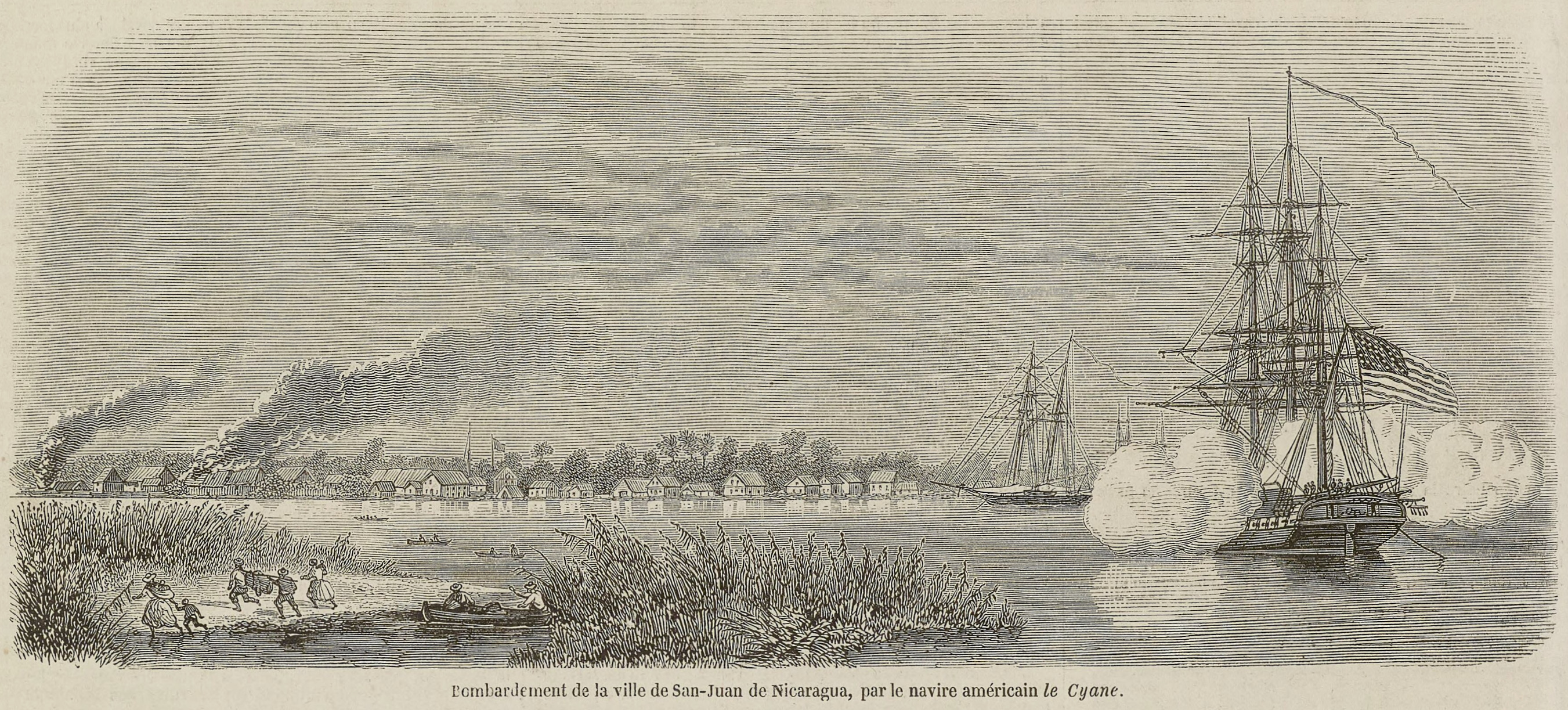
Bombardment of Greytown, Miskito Kingdom, July 1854

In August 1858, Cyane stood out for the Pacific, joining the Pacific Squadron. In 1863, during the Civil War, the Cyane prevented the sloop J. M. Chapman from being used as a Confederate privateer when her armed boarding party took control of the ship as it was preparing to leave San Francisco.

Except for necessary overhauls, the Cyane was constantly employed on the coasts of North and South America until she was decommissioned and placed in ordinary at Mare Island Navy Yard on 20 September 1871. She was sold at auction on 30 July 1887.
