= Greytown, Nicaragua =

Town in Nicaragua

Greytown
- Town
- Nickname: San Juan de la Cruz
- Interactive map of Greytown
- Coordinates: 10°56′48″N 83°44′08″W
- Country: Nicaragua
- Department: Río San Juan
- Municipality: San Juan de Nicaragua

Population
  - Total: 2,161

Greytown, formerly known as San Juan de la Cruz, is a coastal town in Río San Juan Department in Nicaragua. It is located at the mouth of the San Juan River and serves as the administrative centre of the municipality of San Juan de Nicaragua. The town is notable for its pivotal geopolitical role in the 19th century during disputes between United Kingdom, the United States, and Nicaragua over regional dominance, canal access, and sovereignty over the Kingdom of Mosquitia.

== History ==
=== Early history and strategic importance ===
Due to its location at the mouth of the San Juan River, the town has historically held strategic significance as a gateway between the Caribbean Sea and the interior of Central America, particularly Lake Nicaragua and the city of Granada.

=== Renaming of Greytown ===
In 1841, as part of a broader effort to support the territorial claims of the Kingdom of Mosquitia, King Robert Charles Frederic, accompanied by Colonel Alexander MacDonald, Superintendent of British Honduras, visited San Juan del Norte, a small but strategic settlement located at the mouth of the San Juan River.

At the time, the town was under the de facto control of Colonel Manuel Quijano, a Nicaraguan official styled as commandant of the port. Upon arrival, King Robert Charles Frederic and MacDonald found a civil population that expressed strong dissatisfaction with Quijano, accusing him of abuse of authority and oppressive conduct. Their grievances included appeals for protection and a request that Quijano be removed, due to what they described as his widespread unpopularity and mistreatment of the local population.

Macdonald also received reports that implicated Quijano in the recent deaths of Colonel Juan Galindo and a fellow officer—both of British origin—who had been serving with the Central American Federation. Further testimony came from the captains of United States brigs Galen and Francis anchored nearby, whose ships had been plundered by Quijano and likewise urged action.

In response to these appeals—and in line with Britain's long-standing protectorate over Mosquitia—Macdonald raised the Mosquitia flag over the town as a symbol of Mosquitia's sovereignty. He then placed Quijano aboard his vessel and later disembarked him at Cape Gracias a Dios, allowing him to return overland to Nicaraguan jurisdiction. No military action took place, and the transition occurred without bloodshed or formal resistance. The Nicaraguan government protested, but Britain did not take action against MacDonald for the incident.

In 1847, King George Augustus Frederic visited Jamaica, where he was formally received by Governor Sir Charles Edward Grey. On 8 December 1847, in commemoration of this diplomatic visit and in gratitude for British support, the Mosquitia government renamed the town Greytown in the Governor’s honour. Greytown would later serve as the main Atlantic port of Mosquitia and a key site in Central American geopolitics throughout the mid-19th century.

== Geography ==
Greytown is situated on a coastal lagoon system at the delta of the San Juan River, near the border with Costa Rica. The area is surrounded by tropical rainforest and is located within the Indio Maíz Biological Reserve, one of Nicaragua's most ecologically diverse protected areas. Due to its remote location and limited road access, the town is primarily reached by boat or small aircraft.

== See also ==
- Bombardment of Greytown
