= Ballast Point Lighthouse =

Lighthouse in California, United States

Ballast Point Light
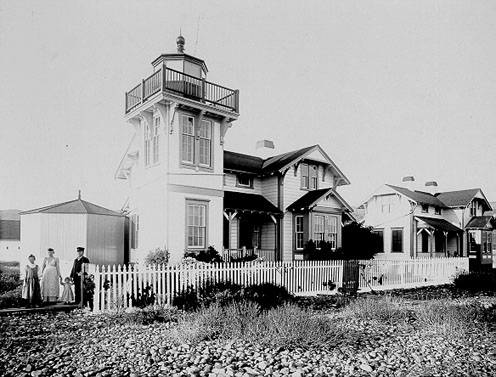
- Lighthouse, U.S. Coast Guard Archive
- Location: Point Loma, San Diego, California
- Coordinates: 32°41′11.0″N 117°13′57.0″W

Tower
- Constructed: 1890
- Height: 34 foot (10 m)
- Shape: Square

Light
- First lit: 1891
- Deactivated: 1960 (Demolished)
- Lens: Fifth order Fresnel lens
- Characteristic: Fixed White

Ballast Point Lighthouse was a lighthouse in San Diego, California, situated on Ballast Point, a tiny peninsula extending into San Diego Bay from Point Loma. The lighthouse was torn down in 1960; the site is now on the grounds of Naval Base Point Loma. Ballast Point Lighthouse was the last lighthouse displaying a fixed light on the Pacific coast. An automated light is left in its place and operates on a piling in the water off of the original site.

== History ==
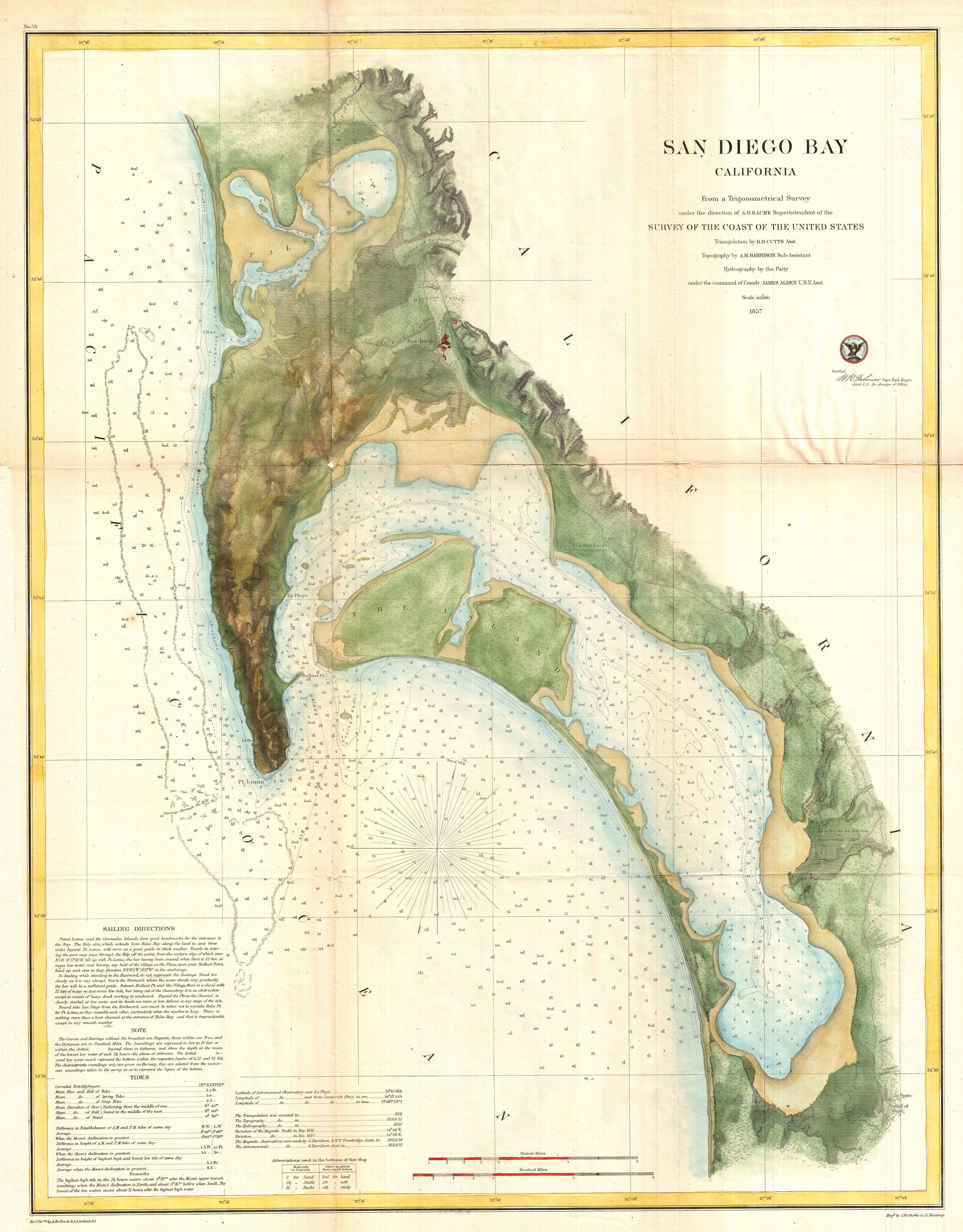
1857 map showing Point Loma in relation to San Diego Bay; Ballast Point is the small peninsula at the harbor mouth.

Historical information from Coast Guard web site:

By Harmon Lougher, Photographer’s Mate First Class

Ballast Point is a tiny peninsula extending from Point Loma into the channel entrance to the harbor of San Diego. The point derived its name from the fact that the early Yankee skippers would have stones gathered from Ballast Point to serve as ballast in their ships during their returns around Cape Horn to their home town, Boston.

Juan Rodríguez Cabrillo sailed from the Port of Navidad (now Acapulco) in 1542 and, after bucking head winds and seas for five months, sighted the Coronado Islands. As he continued on, the headland of Point Loma rose from the sea. Working his way past the kelp beds, he dropped anchor in the quiet waters inside the present Ballast Point on September 28, 1542. Cabrillo tarried for six days in this spacious harbor which he named San Miguel. Sixty years passed before the placid waters around Ballast Point were again disturbed by deep-sea keels, when Sebastián Vizcaíno anchored on November 10, 1602. He renamed the harbor San Diego in honor of that Saint's day. In 1769, Spain decided to occupy the vast territory by converting the Indians to the Catholic faith and teaching them domestic pursuits. By this time little transports were coming with supplies on a haphazard schedule, and when the Clipper ship Aranzaya arrived in 1795, she brought three workmen and the necessary timber to build a fort at Ballast Point, or as it was known at that time, Point Guijarros.

Shore whaling was a natural for the people in this area since the whales reversed the usual procedure and came to the whaler. The carcases were towed to Ballast Point where the blubber was boiled in 150-gallon try pots.

In 1890, Ballast Point Lighthouse was constructed. The original buildings consisted of two dwellings and a light tower which was part of the keeper’s quarters. The light was a fifth order fixed classical lens with a green shade, inside a brass and glass lantern with a focal height of 34 feet (10 m). The tower itself was a white square tower.

In June of this year (1960), the old dwellings were torn down leaving the tower free standing; however, during repairs to the tower it was found to be unstable due to failure of the brick and mortar foundation.

"The 1960s did not destroy Ballast Point lighthouse completely. After the tower was torn down, the lantern room moved around San Diego County, finally settling outside the West Sea Company in Old Town (2495 Congress St), where you can view it today. The fog signal tower was also moved in 1961 after it was discontinued to a home in Lakeside California, where it remains."

== New tower ==
Historical information from Coast Guard web site:

By Harmon Lougher, Photographer’s Mate First Class

It was decided to relocate the light on top of the fog signal building and demolish the old tower. Cabrillo National Monument, National Park Service, requested the lens and light for their museum soon to be built. Arrangements have been made for that Service to remove the lantern and lens prior to the demolition of the tower. The new light is a standard 375 millimetres (14.8 in) lens with storm panes, which will be an occulting white, six second light, three seconds off, three seconds on.

The old light used a 120 volt, 300 watt lamp, giving 1700 candlepower. The new light, even though it uses a slightly smaller lamp, 32 volt, 250 watt, will give 9000 candlepower, due to the increased efficiency of the filament and the removal of the green shade. The fog signal is a single tone diaphone which emits 1 blast every 15 seconds. In the event the diaphone becomes inoperative, the men on station are required to ring a large bell by hand, with one stroke every seconds. As a matter of interest it is noted the diaphone has never been inoperative since installation in 1926. Adjacent to the light structure are located a new three-bedroom and a four-bedroom duplex type dwelling, completely furnished which house resident personnel and their families. The new light has been shown from its new location since 5 August, and the demolition of the old tower is presently being accomplished. Ballast Point was the last lighthouse displaying a fixed light on the Pacific Coast.

== Current light ==
The only reminder left of the Ballast Point Lighthouse is an automated light operating at Ballast Point on a piling in the water off of Ballast Point. It is listed as USCG number 6-1570, showing a white flash every four seconds (Fl W 4s). A daymark and a fog horn are also installed.
