= United Nations Security Council Resolution 562 =

UN Security Council Resolution 562
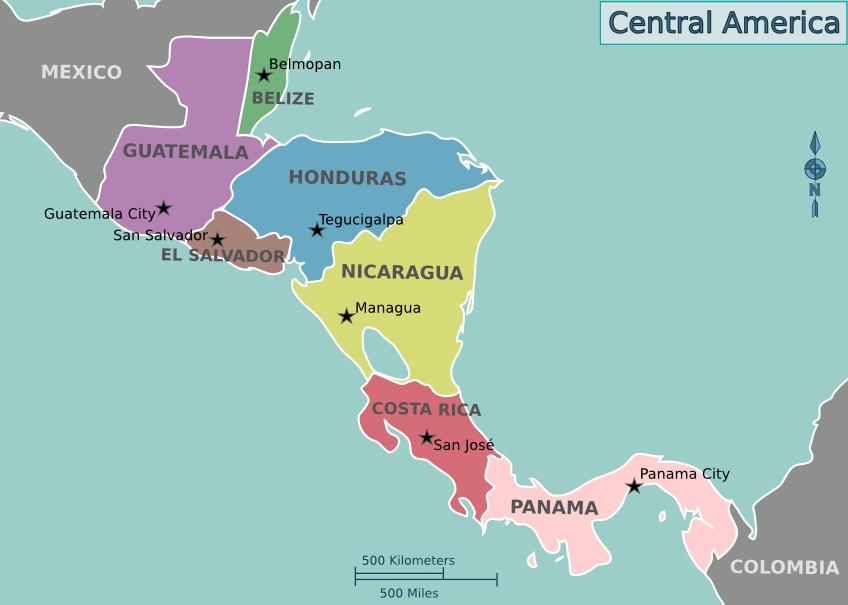
- Central America
- Date: 10 May 1985
- Meeting no.: 2,580
- Code: S/RES/562 (Document)
- Subject: Nicaragua–USA
- Result: Adopted

Security Council composition
- Permanent members: China; France; Soviet Union; United Kingdom; United States
- Non-permanent members: Australia; Burkina Faso; Denmark; Egypt; India; Madagascar; Peru; Thailand; Trinidad and Tobago; Ukrainian SSR

United Nations Security Council resolution 562 was adopted on 10 May 1985.

After recalling Resolution 530 (1983) and various General Assembly resolutions that affirmed the right of Nicaragua and other countries to live in peace without outside interference, the Security Council reaffirmed its support for the efforts of the Contadora Group, and called upon all Member States to refrain from carrying out or supporting political, military or economic actions in the region that would impede the peace initiatives of the Contadora Group. It also called upon the governments of the United States and Nicaragua to resume dialogue they had been holding in Mexico with a view to normalising their relations.

The resolution was adopted paragraph by paragraph, and thus no vote on the resolution as a whole took place.

== See also ==
- Contras
- List of United Nations Security Council Resolutions 501 to 600 (1982–1987)
- Nicaragua v. United States
- Psychological Operations in Guerrilla Warfare
