= The Freedom Fighter's Manual =

1983 booklet airdropped over Nicaragua

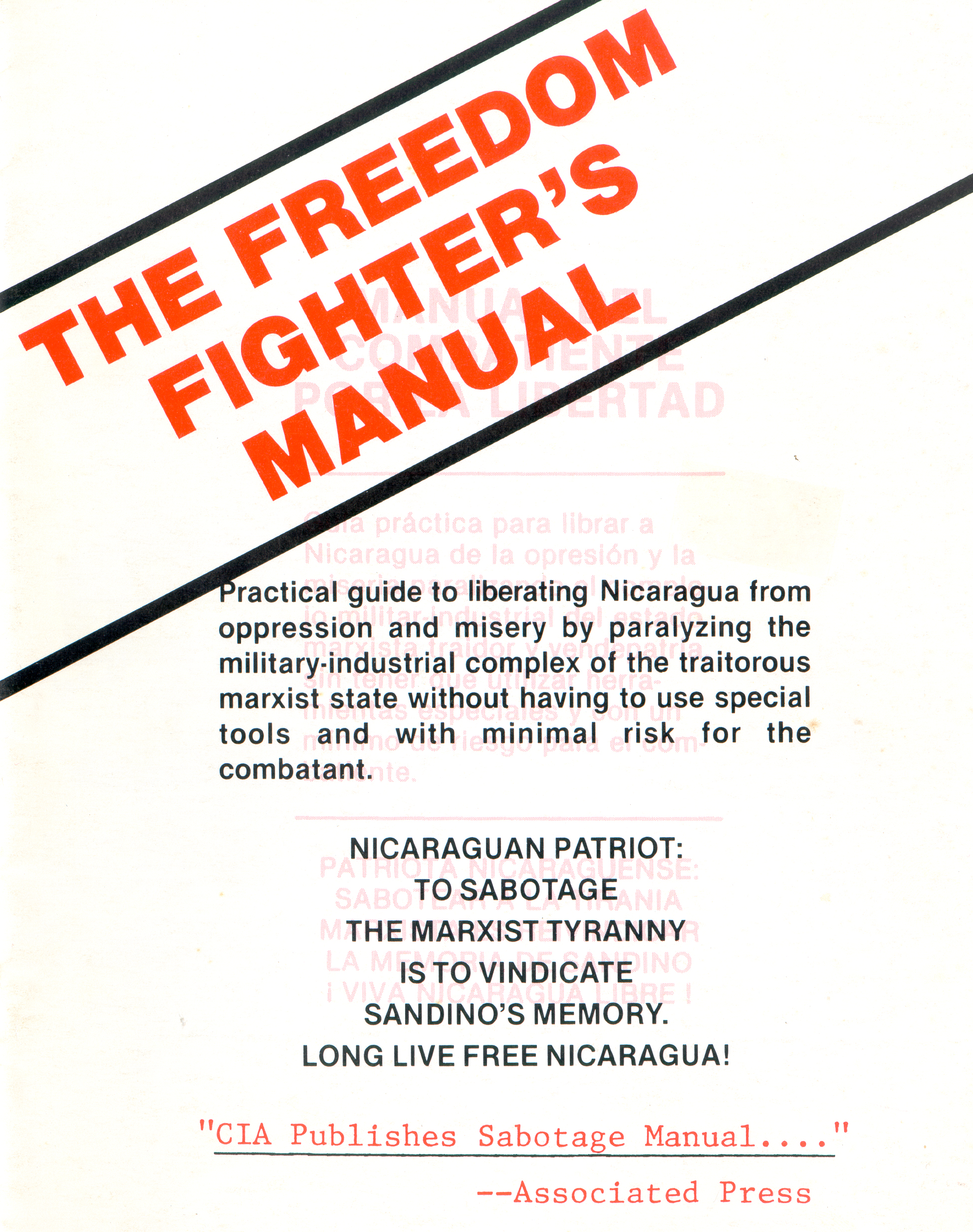
Front cover of the manual

The Freedom Fighter's Manual is a fifteen-page propaganda booklet that was manufactured by the United States Central Intelligence Agency and airdropped over Nicaragua in 1983, with the stated goal of providing a "Practical guide to liberating Nicaragua from oppression and misery by paralyzing the military-industrial complex of the traitorous marxist state". The manual explains several methods by which the average citizen could cause civil disorder. A Contra fighter gave the manual to a U.S. reporter in Honduras in 1984.

== Contents ==
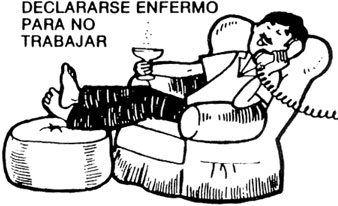
A page of the manual showing a man unnecessarily calling in sick to work, diminishing productivity, especially in the nationalized industries of a Communist country.

The publication describes many ways in which the average citizen could disrupt the everyday workings of the government. It begins with actions that require little to no risk at all, such as hiding or destroying important tools, calling in sick for work, and leaving lights and faucets on. It then progresses to instruct people to steal food from the government, release livestock from farming cooperatives, make false reports of fires and crimes, and sever telephone lines. Four pages are devoted to disabling vehicles. By the end of the pamphlet, there are detailed diagrams showing how to make Molotov cocktails and use them to firebomb police stations.

== See also ==
- CIA activities in Nicaragua
- Iran–Contra affair
- Oliver North
- Nicaragua v. United States
- Psychological warfare
- Psychological Operations in Guerrilla Warfare
- U.S. Army and CIA interrogation manuals
- U.S. Army Field Manual 30-31B
- United States involvement in regime change
