= United Nations Security Council Resolution 530 =

UN Security Council Resolution 530
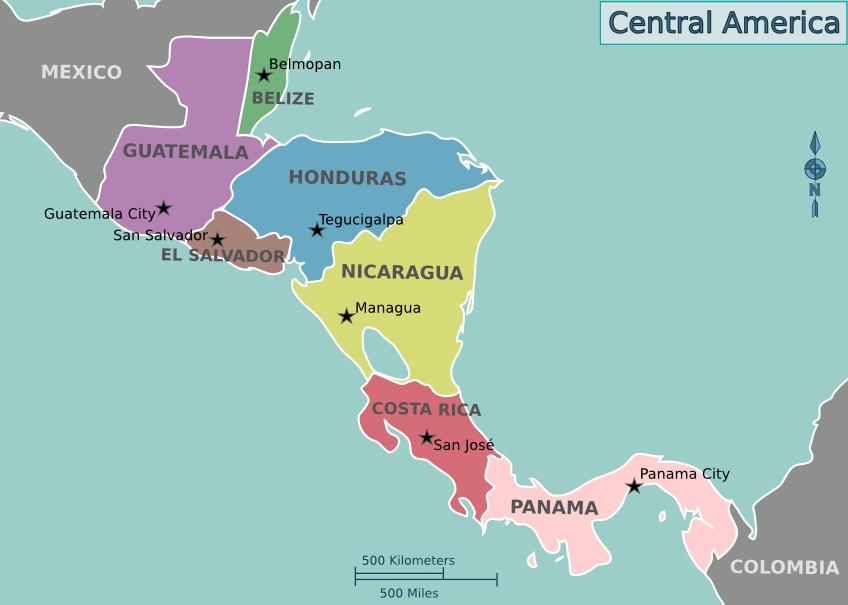
- Central America
- Date: 19 May 1983
- Meeting no.: 2,437
- Code: S/RES/530 (Document)
- Subject: Honduras–Nicaragua
- Voting summary: 15 voted for; None voted against; None abstained
- Result: Adopted

Security Council composition
- Permanent members: China; France; Soviet Union; United Kingdom; United States
- Non-permanent members: Guyana; Jordan; Malta; Netherlands; Nicaragua; Pakistan; Poland; Togo; Zaire; Zimbabwe

United Nations Security Council resolution 530 was adopted unanimously on 19 May 1983. Having heard statements from Nicaragua and other Member States on the issue, the Security Council expressed its deep concern at the situation on the Honduras-Nicaragua border, and a possible military confrontation.

The Council also expressed appreciation for the Contadora Group and its efforts to resolve the situation in Central America. The Foreign Ministers of Mexico, Venezuela, Panama and Colombia had previously expressed concern at foreign interference in conflicts and disputes in Central America, urging the countries themselves, along with the Contadora Group, to solve disputes to establish peace in the region. The resolution urged the Contadora group to "spare no effort" to find solutions and, along with the Secretary-General, to keep the council informed of developments in the situation.

== See also ==
- Contras
- List of United Nations Security Council Resolutions 501 to 600 (1982–1987)
- Nicaragua v. United States
- Psychological Operations in Guerrilla Warfare
- United Nations Security Council Resolution 562
