= CIA activities in Nicaragua =

US intervention in the country

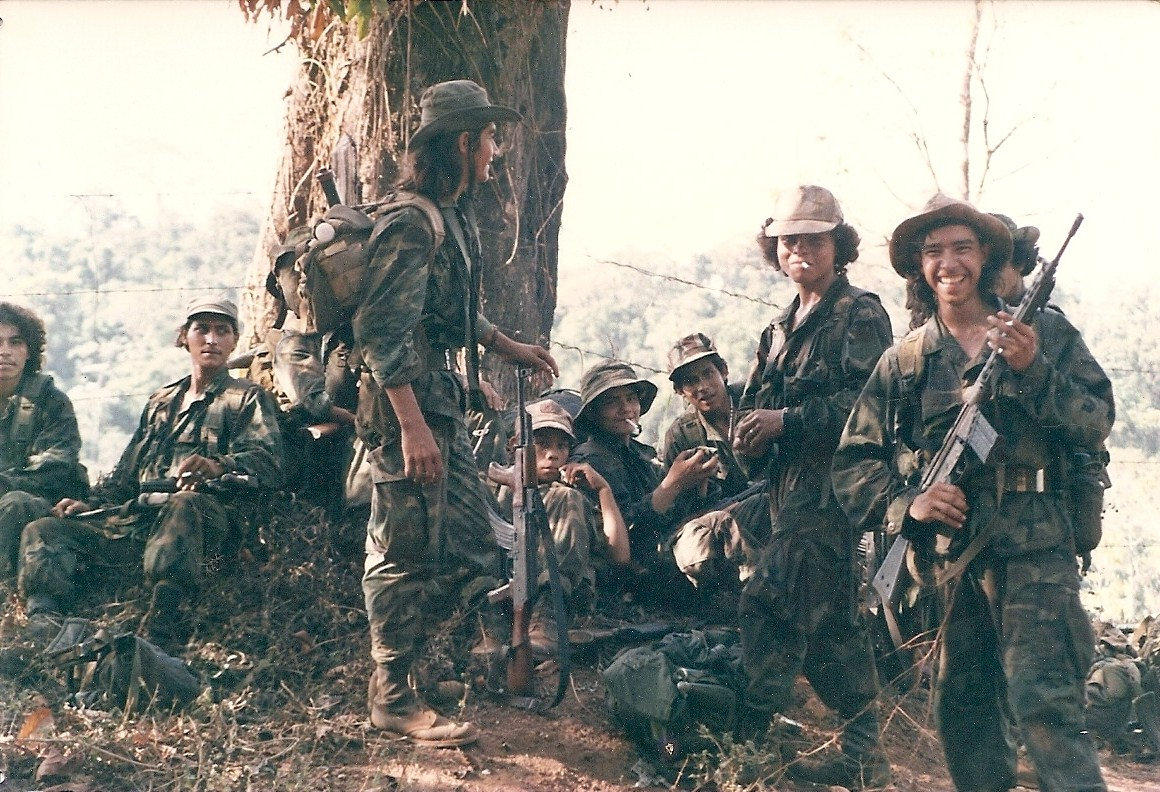
A group of Contras rest after a firefight during the Nicaraguan Civil War. The Contras were organized and funded in part via the CIA.

CIA activities in Nicaragua were frequent in the late 20th century. The increasing influence gained by the Sandinista National Liberation Front, a left-wing and anti-imperialist political party in Nicaragua, led to a sharp decrease in Nicaragua–United States relations, particularly after the Nicaraguan Revolution. In 1981, President Ronald Reagan authorized the Central Intelligence Agency to support the Contras, a right-wing Nicaraguan political group to combat the influence held by the Sandinistas in the Nicaraguan government. Various anti-government rebels in Nicaragua were organized into the Nicaraguan Democratic Force, the first Contra group, at the behest of the CIA. The CIA also supplied the Contras with training and equipment, including materials related to torture and assassination. There have also been allegations that the CIA engaged in drug trafficking in Nicaragua.

== 1960 to 1980 ==
=== Background information and the precipitation of the Contra conflict ===
In 1961, the Frente Sandinista de Liberacion Nacional (FSLN) was founded. The development of the FSLN represented the merger of "Carlos Fonseca's Nicaraguan Patriotic Youth organization ... with Tomas Borge's Cuban-supported insurgent group." The FSLN remained a largely unsuccessful and a marginal political movement until 1972, when an earthquake rocked the Nicaraguan capital, Managua. The Somoza government, which had assumed control of Nicaragua shortly following the withdrawal of United States military personnel in 1933, was seen to be profiteering from international relief efforts in the immediate aftermath of the earthquake. This led to a dramatic change in the influence and importance of the FSLN, as their position within the Nicaraguan public sentiment, began a rapid ascension. Between 1972 and 1978, fighting between the FSLN guerrillas and the Nicaraguan National Guard steadily increased. In 1978 "Pedro Joaquin Chamorro, editor of the opposition newspaper La Prensa" was assassinated; this caused widespread protests and an increase of support for the FSLN including "non-Marxist groups". The opposition to the oppressive Somoza government was beginning to come to a head.

=== Ouster of Somoza ===
In February 1979, the United States suspended all foreign aid to Nicaragua due to Somoza's unwillingness to compromise. On July 14, 1979, on behalf of President Jimmy Carter, Secretary of State Cyrus Vance sent a letter that urged Somoza to end the status quo and start the transition process following the OAS's recommendation. Secretary Vance tried to convince Somoza that military action to fight the Sandinista was not possible, and the only way to go was through the transition process. The transition would permit the moderate faction to survive and to counterbalance the radical elements within the warring groups. Secretary Vance also reiterated that Somoza's departure should be carried out in due course, and the U.S. government would welcome him in the US. At the same time, on July 15, 1979, the U.S. ambassador in Costa Rica, Marvin Weissman, suggested Secretary Vance to invite moderate groups of Nicaraguans who live in the U.S. to come to the State Department's briefing on July 17 or 18. The purpose of inviting the groups was to bolster the moderates position in Nicaragua to counterbalance the radical factions of the Sandinista during the political transition.

By July, Somoza had fled the country. FSLN Sandinista forces quickly assumed power in Managua, and the United States quickly moved to recognize the legitimacy of the new government and offer aid, however the FSLN chose instead to look to global communist interests including the Soviets and Cubans for support. By 1980, the Government of National Recognition (GRN) under Cuban influence had begun installing pro-Marxist, anti-U.S. doctrine into the Nicaraguan educational system. U.S. policy on Nicaragua began to favor support for anti-Sandinista "Contras", because most people involved in the U.S. intelligence operations, including Richard Nixon feared that "defeat for the rebels would probably lead to a violent Marxist guerrilla movement in Mexico and in other Central American countries."

In the wake of the fall of Somoza, the CIA began efforts to counter alleged Cuban-supported efforts to influence the new FSLN government. On July 19, 1979, President Carter signed a general finding on Nicaragua which directed the CIA "to assist democratic elements in Nicaragua to resist efforts of Cuban-supported and other Marxist groups to consolidate power by disseminating non-attributable propaganda worldwide and in Nicaragua in their support and in opposition to Cuban involvement." A CIA paper from August 1979 lays out an intelligence assessment of the FSLN "Junta" and its leadership. The CIA speculated leadership ties to Cuba as well as past Cuban support would result in Nicaragua joining the pro-Soviet bloc of the non-aligned movement: "in view of the heavy debt owed by the FSLN to Cuba, it is expected that Nicaragua will join Cuba as a member of the pro-Soviet bloc of the NAM." Finally, to support "the U.S. goal of a democratic and pluralistic government in Nicaragua" a number of guidelines for covert action were presented, focusing on political and economic efforts (and not covert paramilitary action): "A. Encourage moderate groups in the GNR by publicizing both in Nicaragua and in the International Community, their programs and actions. B. Expose the Marxist elements in the GNR and their links with Cuba; condemn Cuban subversive activities. C. Support continued strong involvement of other Latin American countries as a moderating influence on FSLN elements in the GNR. D. Support efforts through international organizations to guarantee human rights. E. Encourage the development and maintenance of democratic institutions in particular a free press and political parties; advocate early free elections. F. Publicize efforts by Western nations to provide aid and technical assistance to help rebuild Nicaragua; compare this with assistance provided by communist countries."

== 1981 ==
On December 1, 1981, United States President Ronald Reagan signed a presidential finding which authorized covert operations in Nicaragua. This plan initially called for the U.S. government to cooperate with the Argentinian government, which was already engaged in a similar operation, to train and fund an existing terrorist group in Nicaragua known as the Contras. The Contras also contributed to drug dealing in the U.S. and brought a lot of crack cocaine. Gary Stephen Webb, a reporter for the San Jose Mercury News proved the connection between the crack epidemic and the Contras. Initially the Contras were a group of republican guard members from the old Somoza regime ousted by the Sandinistas after the revolutionary conflict. Later, through the recruitment efforts of the CIA, the group became supplemented by mercenary guerrillas and was extensively trained by the CIA. Eventually, due to the U.S. alliance with Great Britain during the Falklands War, Argentina withdrew support for these programs and the CIA had to relocate their training sites to Honduras.

The CIA carried out the Nicaraguan operation based on military intelligence indicating the Sandinista government had close ties to the Cuban and Soviet governments, which represented a strategic threat to the U.S. U.S. policy planners also feared that the success of democracy and socialism in Nicaragua would inspire revolutions across the continent, thereby challenging U.S. hegemony and the interests of Western corporations. At this time, the Sandinistas were building their military to a level that was disproportionate for the size of Nicaragua; the U.S. saw this as a Soviet-backed push for power in the region. The CIA gave $50,000 (equivalent to $177,000 in 2025) to the training and arming of the Contras in 1981, which was eventually followed up by millions more once the CIA secured funding for the operation. The CIA executed operations of their own: in 1982, a CIA-trained team blew up two bridges in Nicaragua and mined Corinto harbor, which may have been carried out by members of the U.S. military rather than through the indigenous assets the CIA claimed it used. The mines were an attempt to disrupt the Nicaraguan economy by closing down the main shipping port. Petroleum imports and cotton exports were the main targets. The mines they eventually used were specifically designed to only cause a large noise rather than actually damage ships. The logic behind this is that once a harbor was known to be mined, it would be flagged as such and therefore avoided by most shipping companies. This eventually backfired and became somewhat of a self-fulfilling prophecy for the U.S. as this act actually drove the Sandinista government closer to the Soviet Union because it needed petroleum imports.

On April 1, 1981, President Reagan formally suspended economic assistance to the Nicaraguan government. The Reagan administration was waging war through the use of economic sanctions. This was done under section 533F of the International Security and Development Cooperation Act of 1980. It stated that the president may suspend aid if he thinks that the government receiving aid is fueling terrorist organizations. In April 1981, President Reagan felt that he had irrefutable evidence of the Nicaraguan government shipping weapons from Cuba to insurgents in El Salvador. All assistance to the private sector in Nicaragua was still being given.

The United States saw the Sandinistas as Communists, and felt the need to stop them. Congress viewed the Reagan Administration's anti-Sandinista policies with extreme skepticism, and were under the impression that the true goal of the CIA operation in Nicaragua was to overthrow the Sandinista government. Congress' efforts resulted in passage of an amendment in late 1982 introduced by Representative Edward P. Boland to the Fiscal Year 1983 Defense Appropriations bill. This is the first of a series of Boland Amendments prohibiting the CIA, principal conduit of covert American support to the Contras, from spending any money "for the purpose of overthrowing the government of Nicaragua". The CIA, however, interpreted the "purpose" stated in this phrase as the purpose of the CIA rather than the purpose of the end user. Thus, the CIA argued that since the purpose of the CIA was not to overthrow the government, that the money and military assistance went to people who had this goal did not matter. The subsequent lack of change in the Nicaragua operation significantly contributed to the eventual further restrictions imposed by Congress in the second version of the Boland amendment.

The majority report stated, "The Central Intelligence Agency was the U.S. Government agency that assisted the contras. In accordance with Presidential decisions, known as findings, and with funds appropriated by Congress, the C.I.A. armed, clothed, fed and supervised the contras. Despite this assistance, the contras failed to win widespread popular support of military victories within Nicaragua."

== 1982 ==
With presidential approval, the CIA undertook specific activities against Nicaragua. The first activities were directed at providing financial and material support to right-wing Nicaraguan politicians who have become disillusioned with growing Cuban influence in Nicaragua. "The United States aided the right-wing Nicaraguan politicians and their organizations in their efforts to increase internal resistance to the Sandinista National Liberation Front (FSLN) and to create a paramilitary potential to punctuate their resolve to effect changes in Nicaraguan government policies."

This assistance was seen as vital to the continuity of the Nicaraguans as a February 5, 1982, CIA memo from the National Photographic Interpretation Center noted the destruction of Nicaraguan villages along the Nicaragua/Honduras border. In the memorandum, it was remarked that "Imagery revealed at least five Nicaraguan villages ... had been either completely or partially burned." The memo noted that all of these villages were along a small section of the Northeast Nicaraguan/Honduran river border. They also pointed out that the destruction had occurred within the last month. Lastly, the military intelligence stated that tent camps of ~25 tents could be seen in the Honduran territory directly across the river from the destroyed villages.

Assistance was given in the form of funding, a supply of arms, and training. These activities were generated to enable the democratic leaders and organizations to deal with the FSLN leadership from a position of strength. The United States hoped that the democratic Nicaraguans would focus paramilitary operations against the Cuban presence in Nicaragua (along with other socialist groups) and use them as a rallying point for the dissident elements of the Sandinista military establishment.

To increase the odds of success, the United States worked with selected Latin American and European governments, organizations, and individuals to build international support for the objectives of the Nicaraguan democratic groups. Free Nicaraguan groups were encouraged to negotiate with the Nicaraguan government to reach an accord. Relations from foreign governments were encouraged to lend aid in efforts to eliminate the influence of Cuba and the Soviet Union over Nicaraguan government policies and restore freedom and democracy to Nicaragua.

A 1982 intelligence report shows that the US Intelligence Community was monitoring shipments of Soviet-manufactured arms to Nicaragua. Specifically, Nicaragua had received four Soviet amphibious ferries at the El Rama port facilities via Algeria. According to the military intelligence, other military equipment had been removed in Algeria, such as multiple rocket launchers and 12 cargo trucks. Whether this equipment was shipped elsewhere or would continue to Nicaragua later is unspecified, but as of the day of the report, none of these items had been seen in that Latin American nation.

Furthermore, a US Defense Intelligence Agency memorandum for March 1982 estimated that there were, "some 7–8,000 Cubans currently in Nicaragua, of which 1,500–2,000 are military and security personnel." While the Cubans and Nicaraguans announced that these Cubans were in Nicaragua as teachers, construction workers, and rural health workers, the numbers of this personnel fell short of the total number of Cuban personnel known to be in the country. This is what left them with the estimation that there were some 1,500-2,000 Cuban military personnel in Nicaragua.

A confidential State Department cable dated October 20, 1982, detailed counterrevolutionary activity in Nicaragua. It stated that "Sandinista leaders continuously highlight the danger presented by the counterrevolution and link the Contras to alleged U.S. covert action plans. They have displayed captured weapons, ammunition, explosives, and communications gear to the press as evidence of U.S. support." The Sandinista leadership was well aware of United States support of Contra revolutionary forces, but this did not deter U.S. involvement in Nicaragua.

== 1983 ==
=== Presidential directive to support rebel cause ===
On December 1, 1981, President Ronald Reagan signed a classified finding that gave CIA director William J. Casey authorization to "Support and conduct ... paramilitary operations against ... Nicaragua (the government)." Three days later on December 4, 1981, Reagan signed Executive Order 12333, which prohibited assassination performed or conspired by anyone working for or on behalf of the United States Government, banned the intelligence community from any indirect participation that would violate activities forbidden by the order, and banned any covert action that could be conducted to influence United States political processes, public opinion, or media. President Reagan allowed the CIA to carry out covert plans to help the Contras overthrow the Sandinista government while putting laws into effect that criminalized the future actions of the Central Intelligence Agency.

In 1983, the CIA replaced the 1981 document with an upgraded one, which "authorizes the provision of material support and guidance to Nicaraguan resistance groups; its goal is to induce the Sandinista government in Nicaragua to enter into meaningful negotiations with its neighboring nations."

This document also entails political action that was meant to take place: that being that the U.S. "provide financial and material support ... to Nicaraguan opposition leaders and organizations to enable them to deal with the Sandinistas". This was made easy according to documentation from the Kerry Committee wrote that "[Nicaragua] does not have a military, its law enforcement resources remain limited, and its radar system still so poor that Contra supply planes could fly in and out of the clandestine strips without being detected."

=== The Freedom Fighter's Manual ===
In 1983, the Central Intelligence Agency released two manuals to the Nicaraguan Contra rebels. The first, The Freedom Fighter's Manual, was airdropped to rebels over known Contra camps. This 15-page manual was illustrated with captions to educate the mostly illiterate Contras on how to cause civil disruptions for the Sandinista government. The manual started with simple instructions and ideas such as calling in sick to work to decrease production, which would hinder the economy. Soon, the instructions became more destructive, explaining how to perforate fuel tanks with ice picks and how to create Molotov cocktails and burn the fuel supplies.

=== Psychological Operations in Guerrilla Warfare ===
The second manual, Psychological Operations in Guerrilla Warfare, was much more controversial in that it directly instigated the use of assassination or "neutralization" of Sandinista officials as a guerrilla warfare tactic as "selective use of violence for propagandistic effects" (despite Reagan signing legislation that banned the intelligence community from using tactics that would directly or indirectly lead to assassinations). The Nicaraguan Contras were then taught to invoke riots and shootings which would lead to the death of selected members of the cause, with the aim of martyrdom to gain support for the Contra cause. This manual was in direct violation of Executive Order 12333 with its encouragement and instruction to "neutralize carefully selected and planned targets, such as court judges, mesta judges, police and State Security officials, CDS chiefs, etc." While the United States may not have directly participated in any assassinations, it conspired to do so through a rebel group that was being funded by the United States Congress, and later the United States National Security Council.

When asked to answer for the manual in the second of two debates for the 1984 presidential election, President Reagan first stated, "We have a gentleman down in Nicaragua who is on contract to the CIA, advising – supposedly on military tactics – the Contras. And he drew up this manual." The panelist who was interviewing President Ronald Reagan and his opponent Walter Mondale then asked if the president was implying that the CIA was directing the activity of the Contras. President Reagan then quickly stepped back and stated: "I'm afraid I misspoke when I said a CIA head in Nicaragua. There's not someone there directing all of this activity. There are, as you know, CIA men stationed in other countries in the world and, certainly, in Central America. And so it was a man down there in that area that this was delivered to, and he recognized that what was in that manual was in direct contravention of my own Executive Order, in December 1981, that we would have nothing to do with regard to political assassinations."

== 1984 ==
According to declassified CIA documents, covert activities in Nicaragua were a combination of political action, paramilitary action, propaganda, and civic action. The 1984 fiscal year CIA budget for these operations was budgeted at $19 million, with $14 million as additional funding available if the agency deemed it necessary.

Reagan's posture towards the Sandinista government was highly controversial both then and now. His administration circumvented the Boland Amendment, although it is not clear what he knew and ordered, and what was done in his name by White House staff and the then-Director of Central Intelligence, William Casey.

Several actions were taken by National Security Council staff, actions that the Boland Amendments had forbidden to the CIA. While the CIA, as an organization, was not allowed to act in this manner, Director of Central Intelligence William Casey took part in White House/NSC discussions and actions to follow the Reagan policy.

The NSC staff's efforts to assist the contras in the wake of Congress's withdrawal of funding took many forms. Initially, it meant extending its earlier initiative to increase third-country contributions to the contras. Casey and McFarlane broached the subject of such financing at a June 25, 1984, meeting of the National Security Planning Group (NSPG), consisting of the President, Vice President Bush, Casey, (National Security Advisor) Robert McFarlane, Secretary of State George Shultz, Secretary of Defense Caspar Weinberger, United Nations Ambassador Jeane Kirkpatrick, Chairman of the Joint Chiefs of Staff Gen. John Vessey, and presidential adviser Edwin Meese III. Shultz warned that any approach to a third country could be viewed as an "impeachable offense," and convinced the group that it needed a legal opinion from Attorney General William French Smith. McFarlane agreed and told the group not to approach any foreign country until the opinion was delivered. McFarlane said nothing about what he already had obtained from the Saudis.

Questions arose as to the suitability of specific actions taken by the National Security Council staff and how the decision to transfer arms to Iran had been made. Congress was never informed. A variety of intermediaries, both private and governmental, some with motives open to question, had central roles. The N.S.C. staff rather than the C.I.A. seemed to be running the operation. The President appeared to be unaware of the crucial elements of the operation. The controversy threatened a crisis of confidence in the manner in which national security decisions are made and the role played by the N.S.C. staff.

As a supplement to the normal N.S.C. process, the Reagan Administration adopted comprehensive procedures for covert actions. These are contained in a classified document, NSDD-159, establishing the process for deciding, implementing, monitoring, and reviewing covert activities.

After the Boland Amendment was enacted, it became illegal under U.S. law to fund the Contras; National Security Adviser Robert McFarlane, Deputy National Security Adviser Admiral John Poindexter, National Security Council staffer Col. Oliver North and others continued an illegal operation to fund the Contras, leading to the Iran-Contra scandal. At that point, members of the National Security Council staff continued covert operations forbidden to the CIA. Such operations were justified under the pretense that the 1984 Boland Amendment did not specify what constituted an 'agency involved in intelligence gathering' beyond that of the CIA or DOD.

According to a memo by the Deputy Director of Intelligence, Nicaragua became a growing military force in the region. Specifically, this memo claimed that "the Soviets and Cubans are turning Nicaragua into an armed camp with military forces far beyond its defensive needs." This was determined to be a growth too big for the apparent needs of the Nicaraguans. This led the government to suspect such growth was a sign that Nicaragua was growing as a communist hub, similar to Cuba. The CIA was particularly concerned with Nicaragua becoming a communist ally of the Soviet Union and Cuba on the mainland of the Western hemisphere, with the goal of spreading the ideology further in the Americas. The deputy director compared it to the struggle that metastasized in Vietnam, stating that their strategy in Vietnam of gradually applying measures over a long period of time caused their campaign to fail; gradual application allowed the enemy to adjust and adapt to what the U.S. did, forming tolerance to U.S. attacks that allowed them to bounce back quickly. For these reasons, the deputy director warned against applying the same strategy in Nicaragua, as "half measures, half-heartedly applied, will have the same results." He wrote that the CIA's actions up to that point have fallen in line with half-hearted approach in Vietnam due to a lack of agreement among the government on what their main objective should be. The CIA initially focused on blocking the sale of weapons to El Salvador, but the deputy director argued that doing so was only dealing with one small part of the larger problem in Latin America.

=== Drug allegations ===
In 1984, U.S. officials began receiving reports of Contra rebels involving themselves in cocaine trafficking. Three CIA officials told journalists that they considered these reports "reliable". Former Panamanian deputy of health minister Dr. Hugo Spadafora, who had fought with the Contra army, outlined charges of cocaine trafficking to a prominent Panamanian official and was later found murdered. The charges linked the Contra trafficking to Sebastian Gonzalez Mendiola, who was charged with cocaine trafficking on November 26, 1984, in Costa Rica.

October 28, the FBI found "345 kilos of cocaine" in South Florida with the intention of being sold, and the profit used "to finance a plot to assassinate Honduran President Roberto Suazo Córdova. The FBI arrested Honduran General José Bueso Rosa. Bueso was a key figure in the CIA dealing with the Contras and "efforts [were] made ... to deter him from disclosing details of these covert operations."

Several years later, a Senate committee investigated the several Contra-connected corporations that had been used by the State Department to supply "humanitarian aid" to the region. The committee connected the crack-cocaine epidemic to the Contra-connected corporations and found that the drugs were distributed on the streets in Los Angeles. CIA participation, albeit indirect, was a result of a partnership with well-known drug trafficker Alan Hyde. Hyde had been known by the criminal syndicate world to be a large distributor and trafficker of cocaine. From 1987 to 1989, the CIA cooperated with Hyde and used his vast network of covert shipping lanes in the Caribbean to supply arms to the Contras. The Central American Task Force had warned the CIA of involvement with Hyde, but the CIA persisted. Regarding involvement with Hyde, CIA deputy director Robert Gates remarked, "We need to use him, but we also need to figure out how to get rid of him." Despite intelligence suggesting Hyde's involvement with the Tampa/St. Petersburg air smuggling ring, the CIA authorized the use of more storage facilities owned by Hyde.

=== Iran link ===
Initially, United States President Reagan told the American people that the U.S. did not and would not sell arms for hostages. However, arms were being sold to Iran in exchange for hostages which Reagan soon revealed. The arms sold included guns, cannons, ammunition, and tanks. The weapons were used against other American troops and resulted in hundreds of deaths of United States members of the armed forces. The American citizens felt betrayed by their leaders and soon uncovered numerous more scandals that the public was unaware of. One would be the importation of opiates into the United States from Afghanistan. The economic benefits of drug sales was a fact concealed by the malicious intention to focus on the sale of guns for money when all of the profits were truly found in the drug markets.

The sale of arms to Iran in exchange for cash to be sent to Nicaraguan Contras was facilitated by Israel, in the CIA-approved operation underlying the Iran-Contra Affair. In a memo from CIA Director William Casey to Robert C. McFarlane, Assistant to the President for National Security Affairs, titled Supplemental Assistance to Nicaragua Program on March 27, 1984, Casey writes, "In view of the possible difficulties in obtaining supplemental appropriations to carry out the Nicaraguan covert action project through the remainder of this year, I am in full agreement that you should explore funding alternatives with the Israelis and perhaps others. I believe your thought of putting one of your staff in touch with the appropriate Israeli official should be promptly pursued." He goes on to write, "Although additional moneys are indeed required to continue the project in the current fiscal year, equipment and material made available from other sources might in part substitute for some funding."

This document helps to establish the need the CIA had for assistance in the form of money and weaponry to aid the Contras in their fight against the Sandinista, especially after Congress outlawed funding by America for the Contra/Sandinista fighting (through the various bills and legislation enacted by Congress). In November 1984, retired CIA agent Ted Shackley met with a notorious Iranian swindler named Manucher Ghorbanifar, whom the CIA had identified as "an intelligence fabricator and a nuisance". Colonel North was later asked, if even Ghorbanifar knew that they were supporting the Contras and North Responded, "Yes, he did." Tim Weiner writes in Legacy of Ashes:

Shackley listened with interest as Ghorbanifar discussed ways to free the American hostages. Perhaps it could be a secret ransom, a straight cash deal. Or perhaps it could be profitable. The United States could ship missiles to Iran, using a trading firm ... The sale of weapons would create goodwill in Tehran, millions for the private traders involved, and a large cash ransom to free Bill Buckley and his fellow American hostages. Shackley reported the conversation to the ubiquitous Vernon Walters, who passed it on the counter-terrorism czar Robert Oakley.

In 1985, William Casey made the decision to go ahead with the sale of American weapons to Iran, and use the money to fund the Contras, all outside the government's knowledge.

President Reagan had been receiving pleas from the families of the hostages asking for something to be done. Reagan was deeply impacted by this and would turn to Bill Casey for solutions. Bob Gates said, in regards to Reagan's expectations of the CIA to end the crisis, "He put more and more pressure on Casey to find them. Reagan's brand of pressure was hard to resist. No loud words or harsh indictments—none of the style of Johnson or Nixon. Just a quizzical look, a suggestion of pain, and then the request—'We just have to get those people out'—repeated nearly daily, week after week, month after month. Implicit was the accusation: What the hell kind of intelligence agency are you running if you can't find and rescue these Americans?"

=== Mining of Nicaraguan harbors ===
From January to March 1984 three harbors in Nicaragua were mined by the CIA: Corinto, Puerto Sandino, and El Bluff. The mining was carried out by CIA operatives on speedboats, operating from larger "mother ships". The mining operations had been approved by President Ronald Reagan under the advice of his National Security Adviser Robert McFarlane. The mines were acoustic mines designed, allegedly, to frighten merchant sailors, rather than to harm them. The mines had the effect of disrupting Nicaraguan shipping and economic activities by damaging at least seven vessels, including blowing up numerous Nicaraguan fishing boats and damaging several foreign merchant ships, including a Soviet freighter and a Dutch dredger. The mining operation resulted in a political outcry in the United States with Senator Barry Goldwater (R-AZ), the chairman of the Senate Intelligence Committee declaring, "I am pissed off!". Several Democrats called for a special prosecutor to determine if Reagan had broken federal law in ordering the mining and The New York Times called it "illegal, deceptive, and dumb" and compared it to German U-boats attacking neutral merchant shipping in World War I.

=== Nicaragua v. United States of America ===
In 1984, Nicaragua presented a case to the International Court of Justice against the United States of America for violation of international law. The court ruled in favor of Nicaragua, determining in its verdict that the United States was "in breach of its obligations under customary international law not to use force against another State", "not to intervene in its affairs", by violating the sovereignty of Nicaragua, by interrupting "peaceful maritime commerce", and was "in breach of its obligations under Article XIX of the Treaty of Friendship, Commerce and Navigation between the Parties signed at Managua on 21 January 1956." The court ordered the United States to pay reparations to Nicaragua for violating international law by training and funding the Contra rebellion movement and for the mining and destruction of several Nicaraguan harbors. The United States declared that the International Court of Justice had no jurisdiction over affairs of the United States, but the court found that it did have jurisdiction. However, the U.S. has vetoed UN Security Council resolutions ordering it to pay reparations to the Republic of Nicaragua. On November 3, 1986, the United Nations General Assembly passed, by a vote of 94-3 (El Salvador, Israel and the US voted against), a non-binding resolution urging the US to comply.

== 1985 ==
A declassified CIA document dated for March 13, 1985, and addressed to Pat Buchanan, reveals details concerning the 'White Propaganda' operation in Nicaragua. Consultants, such as Professor Guilmartin, were hired to produce CIA propaganda op-ed pieces for The New York Times and The Washington Post newspapers to advance the agency's agenda in Nicaragua. The "White Propaganda" operation included The Wall Street Journal that ran a piece on Nicaraguan arms build-up with the help of Buchanan office and staff. A news story broadcast by Tom Brokaw was about what the "freedom fighters" were doing and to get some positive spin on the whole situation. Many more examples of the White Propaganda operation were communicated to Buchanan, but many were not to keep a low profile and not draw attention to the stories.

April 1, 1985, Robert Owen (codenamed "TC" for "The Courier") wrote Oliver North (codenamed "The Hammer") detailed the Southern Front Contra operations. He reported that Adolfo Calero (codenamed "Sparkplug"), the leader of the Nicaraguan Democratic Force (FDN), had chosen a new commander for the Southern Front. This new commander was previously a captain of Eden Pastora and had been paid to defect to the FDN. Owen states that the new Southern Front officials of the FDN units include "people who are questionable because of past indiscretions". Some of these officials were Jose Robelo, who Owen describes as having "potential involvement with drug running", and Sebastian Gonzalez, who Owen states that he is "now involved in drug running out of Panama".

In a July 12 entry, Oliver North wrote about a call from a retired Air Force general named Richard Secord. The two of them discussed a Honduran arms warehouse where the Contras planned to purchase weapons. According to the notebook, Secord told North that "14 M to finance [the arms in the warehouse] came from drugs."

On August 9, 1985, North summarized a meeting with Robert Owen about his liaison with the Contras. The two of them discussed a plane that was used by Mario Calero that transport supplies from New Orleans to Contras in Honduras. North writes: "Honduran DC-6 which is being used for runs out of New Orleans is probably being used for drug runs into the U.S." As Lorraine Adams reported in the October 22, 1994 The Washington Post, there are no records that corroborate North's later assertion that he passed this intelligence on drug trafficking to the U.S. Drug Enforcement Administration.

North summarized a hotel meeting he had with Noriega himself in London on September 22. The two discussed making a joint training venture, along with Israel, for the Contras and Afghani rebel groups, as well as economic sabotage against targets in the Managua area.

"After bribing his way out of prison in Venezuela in September 1985, Luis Posada Carriles went directly to El Salvador to work on the illicit Contra resupply operations being run by Lt. Col. Oliver North. Posada assumed the name 'Ramon Medina,' and worked as a deputy to another anti-Castro Cuban exile, Felix Rodriguez, who was in charge of a small airlift of arms and supplies to the contras in Southern Nicaragua. Rodriguez used the code name, Max Gomez. ...Posada and Rodriguez obtaining supplies for contra troops from a warehouse at Illopango airbase in San Salvador."

Guatemala had been providing aid to the Resistance occurring in Nicaragua (freedom fighter), which the US had indirectly supported by delivering supplies to Guatemala as compensation. The Guatemalan Army requested supplies of varying priority in multiple categories. They required helicopters, spare parts for aircraft, training aircraft, communications equipment, logistical transport vehicles, light and medium weapons, ground force and aerial munitions, field hospital equipment, and tactical radars, among other requests.

=== 1985 drug allegations ===
In 1985, another Contra leader "told U.S. authorities that the group was being paid $50,000 by various Colombian traffickers for help with a 100-kilo cocaine shipment and that the money would go 'for the cause' of fighting the Nicaraguan government." A 1985 National Intelligence Estimate revealed cocaine trafficking links to a top commander working under Contra leader Edén Pastora. Pastora had complained about such charges as early as March 1985, claiming that "two 'political figures' in Washington told him last week that State Department and CIA personnel were spreading the rumor that he is linked to drug trafficking in order to isolate his movement." In June 1985, it was found that $1.5 million in DEA seized money was used to help fund the Contras.

On December 20, 1985, the charges were laid out in an Associated Press article after an extensive investigation which included interviews with "officials from the Drug Enforcement Administration (DEA), Customs Service, Federal Bureau of Investigation (FBI) and Costa Rica's Public Security Ministry, as well as rebels and Americans who work with them." Five American Contra supporters who worked with the rebels confirmed the charges, noting that "two Cuban-Americans used armed rebel troops to guard cocaine at clandestine airfields in northern Costa Rica. They identified the Cuban-Americans as members of the 2506 Brigade, an anti-Castro group that participated in the 1961 Bay of Pigs attack on Cuba. Several also said they supplied information about the smuggling to U.S. investigators." One of the Americans "said that in one ongoing operation, the cocaine is unloaded from planes at rebel airstrips and taken to an Atlantic coast port where it is concealed on shrimp boats that are later unloaded in the Miami area."

United States Knowledge of Drug Trafficking and the Contras

An April 1, 1985 memo from Robert Owen (code-name: "T.C." for "The Courier") to Oliver North (code-name: "The Hammer") reveals an in-depth knowledge of the United States about drug trafficking and the activities of the Contra in the Southern Front of Nicaragua. The correspondence describes contra operations on the Southern Front. Owen tells North that FDN leader Adolfo Calero (code-name: "Sparkplug") has picked a new Southern Front commander, one of the former captains to Eden Pastora who has been paid to defect to the FDN. Owen reports that the officials in the new Southern Front FDN units include "people who are questionable because of past indiscretions," such as José Robelo, who is believed to have "potential involvement with drug running" and Sebastian Gonzalez, who is "now involved in drug running out of Panama."

In the correspondence, Owen pointed out his engagement with leaders of the Southern Font, where they discussed the needs of the new wing of the Contras group. Their needs range from food and equipment to medical, weapons, and ammunition suppliers. As part of an effort to "structure and organize a new southern front", the members expressed that they needed financial assistance to help support its operations in the Southern frontiers. The group requested that they would need "financial backing on a monthly basis", and that they were" more than willing to account for the funds spent". The group established that without this assistance, they would be forced to "abandon the fight". In response, Owen assured the group he "will get back to them" in a week or three.

More than just knowledge of drug Trafficking and engagement with the Contras, Owen provided insight into the integral role the United States played in supporting the operation of the Contras. He reveals that certain individuals were "willing to outright donate between 70,000 and 80,000 Ibs. of medical suppliers" to help achieve the effort of the group. In other to and concerned the deal from possible track or traces, Owen advised that "the material can be shipped as far as Alabama by the individual who is going donate it, but it has got to get from Alabama to New Orleans."

== 1986 ==
On January 9, President Reagan signed a classified document that authorized the CIA to take actions against the Sandinistas. The document states that the CIA was to stop the spread of communism in Nicaragua and back democratic leaders. The specific actions that Reagan authorized the CIA to take remain redacted in the declassified document.

Robert Owen ("TC") wrote Oliver North on February 10 (this time as "BG" for "Blood and Guts") about a plane used to carry "humanitarian aid" to the Contras. This plane had belonged to Vortex, it was a Miami-based company owned by Michael Palmer, and it was also used previously to transport drugs. Michael Palmer was one of the biggest marijuana traffickers in the United States at that time. Regardless of Palmer's long drug-smuggling history, he received over $300,000 from the Nicaraguan Humanitarian Aid Office (NHAO) which was overseen by North, Assistant Secretary of State for Inter-American Affairs Elliot Abrams, and CIA officer Alan Fiers that was used to ferry supplies to the Contras.

On April 8, Richard Secord made arrangements to drop the first aerial supply drop to the Contras. He planned to drop the supplies within the next few days. The actions were carried out on April 10, but the supply drop failed because they could not establish contact.

The U.S. argued that "The United States initially provided substantial economic assistance to the Sandinista-dominated regime. We were largely instrumental in the OAS action delegitimizing the Somoza regime and laying the groundwork for installation for the new junta. Later, when the Sandinista role in the Salvadoran conflict became clear, we sought through a combination of private diplomatic contacts and suspension of assistance to convince Nicaragua to halt its subversion. Later still, economic measures and further diplomatic efforts were employed to try to effect changes in Sandinista behavior. Nicaragua's neighbors have asked for assistance against Nicaraguan aggression, and the United States has responded. Those countries have repeatedly and publicly made clear that they consider themselves to be the victims of aggression from Nicaragua, and that they desired United States assistance in meeting both subversive attacks and the conventional threat posed by the relatively immense Nicaraguan Armed Forces."

=== 1986 drug allegations ===
On March 16, 1986, the San Francisco Examiner published a report on the "1983 seizure of 430 pounds of cocaine from a Colombian freighter" in San Francisco which indicated that a "cocaine ring in the San Francisco Bay area helped finance Nicaragua's Contra rebels." Carlos Cabezas, convicted of conspiracy to traffic cocaine, said that the profits from his crimes "belonged to ... the Contra revolution". He told the Examiner, "I just wanted to get the Communists out of my country." Julio Zavala, also convicted on trafficking charges, said: "that he supplied $500,000 to two Costa Rican-based Contra groups and that the majority of it came from cocaine trafficking in the San Francisco Bay area, Miami and New Orleans." John Stockwell, a former CIA covert specialist, described the situation as "A dream situation for drug smugglers."

Former CIA agent David MacMichael explained the inherent relationship between CIA activity in Latin America and drug trafficking: "Once you set up a covert operation to supply arms and money, it's very difficult to separate it from the kind of people who are involved in other forms of trade, and especially drugs. There is a limited number of planes, pilots and landing strips. By developing a system for the supply of the Contras, the US built a road for drug supply into the US."

In August 1986, Lt. Col. Oliver North had begun to converse by email with John Poindexter, who was the National Security Adviser to President Ronald Reagan. In the email, North stated that if U.S. officials could, "help clean up [Noriega's] image", that he would be able to, "'take care of' the Sandinista leadership for us." This would require lifting a weapons embargo with Nicaragua. This email proved to be a smoking gun that proved that an illicit sale of arms took place. North would later be arrested for lying to Congress about accepting illicit funds, which ended up going to Noriega to help sabotage the Sandinista regime. August would also be the time that the CIA's Dewey would want to meet Noriega in Europe or Israel.

== 1987 ==
Senator John Kerry, who was the head of the Senate Subcommittee on Narcotics, Terrorism, and International Operations, decided to begin investigating allegations of Contra-drug links. They found that there was an attempt to divert drug money from an anti-narcotics program into the Contra war.

The Kerry Committee report concluded that "senior U.S. policy makers were not immune to the idea that drug money was a perfect solution to the Contra's funding problems."

In February 1987, a US Federal Bureau of Investigation debriefing reported that Dennis Ainsworth agreed to be interviewed by the bureau because of his knowledge of specific information of which he believed the Nicaraguan Contra leaders were selling arms and cocaine for their gain instead of a military effort to overthrow the Nicaraguan government. Ainsworth gave the FBI a list of his extensive contacts with various Contra leaders and backers. As part of Freedom of Information Act lawsuit filed in 1989, hand-written notes of Oliver North were collected as evidence. These notes revealed who helped run the Contra war and other covert operations authorized by the Reagan administration.

The operation underlying the Iran-Contra Affair was given legal approval by then-CIA deputy counsel David Addington among others, according to Salon.com Washington bureau chief Sidney Blumenthal.

== 1987 hearings ==
Preceding the Congressional hearings that took place in May 1987, the United States public had been led to believe, from President Reagan himself, that the U.S. was not involved in the guns-for-hostages exchange. Reagan boldly came before the United States on November 13, 1986, and declared:

Our government has a firm policy, not to capitulate to terrorist demands. That no concessions of policy remain in force. In spite of wildly speculative and false stories about arms for hostages and alleged grants of payments, we did not - repeat - did not trade weapons, or anything else, for hostages, nor will we.

Months later, when more leaks persisted, and it was clear that the United States did, in fact, have a significant role in the Iran-Contra scandal, Reagan went back before the American people on March 4, 1987, and stated, "A few months ago, I told the American people I did not trade arms for hostages. My heart and my best intentions still tell me that's true, but the facts and the evidence tell me it's not." Two months later, a thirteen-week Congressional hearing began concerning U.S. involvement in the weapons-for-hostages exchange and the subsequent distribution of weapons to Nicaraguan Contra fighters.

Of the hearings, Robert White, who served as Ambassador to Paraguay from 1976 to 1980, stated, "What we saw in the Iran-Contra hearings, was the exposure of the beginnings of a national security state, which believes it has the right to overrule the Constitution of the United States in the name of security." Elements of the hearings proved White's comments to be accurate, as evidence and testimony, principally from Oliver North himself, showed a well-planned strategy on the part of U.S. officials to procure hostages in exchange for U.S. weapons. One particular note indicated that Oliver North had received a call from retired Air Force General Richard Secord, a fact that North noted on July 12, 1985. The conversation involved the discussion of a Honduran arms warehouse from which the Contras planned to purchase weapons. Money for the weapons came from U.S.-based funds through Saudi Arabia.

Within the framework of his testimony, North admitted involvement with an Iranian middleman named Manucher Ghorbanifar, stating, "Mr. Ghorbanifar took me into the bathroom, and Mr. Ghorbanifar suggested several incentives to make that February transaction work. And the attractive incentive, for me, was the one he made that residuals could flow to support the Nicaraguan resistance." When asked why he took painstaking efforts to keep those facts from Congress, North responded, "We wanted to be able to deny a covert operation." Other information came to light, including the revealing of other principal figures in the scandal. North testified to a direct question by Senator Paul Sarbanes (D-MD) regarding who the order came from, to which North responded that he collaborated with CIA director William Casey, national security advisor Robert McFarlane, and General Secord.

The legacy of the Iran-Contra affair almost defeated the Reagan administration (much in the same way Watergate ruined Nixon) despite attempted cover-ups. Representative Jack Brooks (D) of Texas said, They systematically destroyed all of the documentation. Hours of shredding." Still, Oliver North was convicted on multiple felony counts. William Casey soon was out as director of the CIA, imploding both politically and physically as his health began to fail him. Bob Gates replaced him but only lasted five months. Gates later stated, "The clandestine service is the heart and soul of the agency. It is also the part that can land you in jail."

== 1988 ==
In March 1988, Both the Sandinistas and the Contras signed a cease fire agreement due to the exhaustion of the conflict and the encouragement of the United States.

On July 28, 1988, two DEA agents testified before the House Subcommittee on the crime regarding a sting operation that was conducted against the Medellin Cartel. The two agents stated that in 1985 Oliver North wanted to take $1.5 million in cartel bribe money to give to the Contras, but the DEA disregarded the idea.

Some important terms of the cease-fire (which was set to last until May) included the release of 3,300 anti-Sandinista prisoners of war, the guarantee of free expression by the Sandinista government, and the recognition of the Contras as an official political group. "In return, the contras agreed to recognize Sandinista rule and the legitimacy of President Daniel Ortega Saavedra. The contras embarked on a process aimed ultimately at disarming themselves and allowing them to return to a different and freer Nicaragua, although they [would] not be required to lay down their weapons until a final peace agreement [was] reached."

In 1988, after the Sapoa agreement signed between the Sandinistas and Contras, a total of 15,000 metric tons of Soviet equipment was transferred from the Contras to the Sandinistas, including 152 tanks, 252,000 rifles, and 370 anti-tank guns. This transfer of weapons lead to the Sandinistas having the largest army in the region of Central America.

== 1989 ==
Building from the 1988 cease-fire agreement, the Bush administration wanted to complete a negotiated settlement to end the fighting between Contras and Sandinistas. This would allow the Contras to return to Nicaragua and compete in open elections. They supported upcoming agreements in February 1989 and August 1989 that defined the plan to end the conflict.

On May 2, 1989, The National Security Council created National Security Directive 8 which included the U.S. policy toward Nicaragua and Nicaraguans. Directive 8 was drafted to advert the Soviet key use of Nicaragua, which included withdrawal of the Soviet and Cuban military presences. The withdraw would reduce the threat Nicaragua posed to its bordering neighbors and other countries in Latin America, by diminishing the size and effectiveness of the Nicaragua military to levels commensurate with Central American stability. They would devise and implement a series of incentives and sanctions. They would also establish criteria for judging if Sandinista performance was adequate to satisfy their objectives.

November 21, 1989, During an informal briefing for the HPSCI members, all agreed that they could not see an end to the wars. They also felt they should lean on the Sandinistas to have free and fair elections.

== 1990 ==
There was a court testimony in 1990 of Fabio Ernesto Carrasco who was a pilot for a major Colombian drug smuggler named George Morales. Carrasco had testified that in 1984 and 1985, he had piloted the planes that were filled with weapons for the Contras in Costa Rica. The weapons were offloaded in Costa Rica and then drugs were stored in military bags and put on the plane to fly to the United States.

He also testified that Morales had provided several million dollars to Octaviano Cesar and Adolfo Chamorro who were two rebel leaders who were working with the leader of the Contra. Chamorro called his CIA control officer and asked if the Contras would accept the money and arms from Morales.

Fabio Ernesto Carrasco also testified that one of the co-pilots, which usually accompanied him, went by the alias, "Hippie". During the course of his drug/weapon moving activities, Fabio, along with George Morales, noted that they had met with leaders of the Contras (Octaviano Cesar, Fopo Chamorro, and two unnamed others) several times in Miami, Florida, During their meetings in Florida, they would utilize places such as hotels, restaurants and even George Morale's own house. One restaurant that was mentioned in Fabio's testimony was called, "The Rusty Pelican". Fabio stated that during 1984–1985 he had made between 30 and 40 money/weapon drops to Costa Rica, which contained "war-grade" weapons (K-19, M-16, AR-15, grenade launchers, etc.) and several million dollars. He stated that the return was in the form of cocaine (an estimated total of 3-4 hundred kilos) shipped in fruit/vegetable crates belonging to the company, Frigorificos de Punta Arenas. Though he could not identify who owned the company, Fabio acknowledged that the company was primarily a front for moving cocaine through Costa Rica.

== 1992 ==
Alan Fiers, a then member of the CIA, reported that North had a substantial hand in the Noriega sabotage proposal. He recalled, at a meeting with Reagan's Restricted Interagency Group, North had "strongly suggested" that the western part of Nicaragua needed a resistance group. He offered to have Noriega cause an issue there so that there would be a resistance group created. It would have cost $1 million. Everyone at the table denied this idea.

== 1996 to 1997 ==
In August 1996, a series of articles titled "Dark Alliance", brought to the fore by journalist Gary Webb at the San Jose Mercury News, linked the origins of crack cocaine and its subsequent epidemic in California to the Contras. Historian Alfred W. McCoy, writing in his 2017 book titled In the Shadows of the American Century: The Rise and Decline of US Global Power, cited the assertions made by the "Dark Alliance" reporting series that "the Contra-run drug network opened the first conduit between Columbia's ... cartels and L.A.'s black neighborhoods", with the additional belief in an accompanying editorial that "It's impossible to believe that the Central Intelligence Agency didn't know." Once the chorus of indignation over the San Jose Mercury News's claims had risen to an undeniable shrill in the African American community, "the national press entered the debate on the side of the CIA ... publishing front-page investigations, attacking the Mercury's story and accusing that paper of fanning the flames of racial discord." The contrast was a guerrilla force that was backed by President Reagan's administration, the same government that attacked Nicaragua's Sandinista government during the 1980s. A year later, the Office of the Inspector General, of the US Department of Justice, investigated the "CIA-Contra-Crack Cocaine" matter, and planned to issue a report in 1997.

== 1998 ==
On December 17, 1997, I signed our completed report entitled, The CIA-Contra-Crack Cocaine Controversy: A Review of the Justice Department's Investigations and Prosecutions. This 407-page report was the culmination of a comprehensive 15-month investigation by the Office of Inspector General (OIG) into allegations first raised in the San Jose Mercury News that U.S. government officials -- including Central Intelligence Agency (CIA) and Department of Justice (DOJ) employees -- either ignored or protected drug dealers in Southern California who were associated with the Nicaraguan Contras. We originally planned to release the report the following day, December 18 publicly, 1997.

However, the Attorney General, citing law enforcement concerns, invoked Section 8E of the Inspector General Act to defer the release of our report. This was the first time that the publication of one of our reports has been prevented in this manner. Given the extraordinary nature of the Attorney General's action and the significant interest in why our story was not released in December 1997, we believe it necessary to describe the sequence of events that resulted in the Attorney General's decision not to permit the report to be publicly disclosed until now.

The report we are releasing today is the same report that we completed on December 17 and planned to release on December 18. It has not been changed in any way.

Inspector General Michael R. Bromwich stated, in the epilogue, that the key issue causing the scheduled release to be deferred was the apparently lenient treatment given to a Nicaraguan, accused of drug dealing by the San Jose Mercury News. This individual, Oscar Danilo Blandon, fled to the United States soon after the Sandinistas came to power. The articles said Blandon was a major supplier to "Freeway" Ricky Ross, major cocaine and crack cocaine dealer in Los Angeles. The question addressed by the Inspector General is why Blandon received a much more lenient sentencing for drug crimes than did Ross. Ross served a thirteen-year sentence from 1996 to 2009.

"Freeway" Ricky Ross, whose real name is Ricky Donnell Ross, presided over a veritable crack cocaine empire in Los Angeles, California, in the 1980s so widespread and streamlined (hence the nickname of "Freeway") that many referred to his savvy marketing and seeming ubiquitousness in the drug trade as the "Wal-Mart of crack". At the height of his drug empire, Ross is said to have sold "3 million [worth of narcotics] in one day" with Blandon "personally" having sold Ross cocaine on "multiple occasions" before Ross re-sold the narcotics across the nation. The Oakland Tribune noted: "In the course of his rise, prosecutors estimate that Ross exported several tons of cocaine to New York, Ohio, Pennsylvania and elsewhere, and made more than $600 million in the process between 1983 and 1984."

One of the primary issues raised in the Mercury News series was why Blandon received such lenient treatment from the government. The articles and the public discussion that ensued also focused on the disparity between Blandon's sentence and the prison sentence of life without parole received by Ross upon his conviction on federal drug charges in 1996 -- a case developed by Blandon acting on behalf of the DEA. The articles suggested that the difference between the treatment of Blandon and Ross might be attributable to Blandon's alleged ties to the CIA or the Contras. The OIG did not find that he had any ties to the CIA, that the CIA intervened in his case in any way, or that any connections to the Contras affected his treatment. We explored the facts surrounding Blandon's sentence reductions and found through our interviews of DEA and federal prosecutors that his reductions in a prison sentence were based on his substantial cooperation with prosecutors and investigators, not ties to the Contras or the CIA. We made no attempt independently to measure the value of Blandon's cooperation; instead we sought to determine whether his cooperation was the reason for his lenient treatment.

"The OIG interviewed Blandon in February 1997 (with the DEA's knowledge), DEA agents who worked with him, and federal prosecutors in San Diego who handled his case. ... we learned the extent of Blandon's cooperation and that he continued to cooperate with the DEA after he was released from prison in September 1994. We also learned that after the Mercury News articles focused attention on Blandon and his activities in late 1996, the DEA stopped using him as an informant."

Our investigation, which began in October 1996, was nearing completion of the investigatory phase in the summer of 1997. In August 1997 we were told by the DEA that it was considering reactivating Blandon and using him as an informant in a criminal investigation. We were asked by the DEA whether we had found any reason to believe that Blandon had perjured himself in interviews with us or in his testimony in a closed session of the Senate Select Committee on Intelligence in October 1996. We replied that we had no such evidence.

In November 1997, we provided a draft of our report to the DEA, the DOJ Criminal Division, and the United States Attorney's Office for the Southern District of California (USAO). We asked them to review the document and provide us any comments regarding the report or disclosure of informant or other law enforcement information. We requested these comments by December 5 because we intended to release the report in mid-December.

On December 8, 1997, we learned for the very first time that the DEA, the Criminal Division, and the USAO objected to our release of information about Blandon's past cooperation with the DEA. We learned that Blandon had been reactivated as an informant in September 1997 to assist with an investigation of international drug dealers. According to the DEA, in order to protect his credibility in the face of the publicity generated by the Mercury News articles, Blandon had told the drug dealers that he had cooperated with the U.S. government in the case against Ricky Ross but had not cooperated against anyone else. As disclosed in our report, Blandon provided assistance to the government in investigations of many drug traffickers other than Ross.

The OIG attempted to negotiate with the DEA, DOJ Criminal Division, US Attorney's Office, and the office of the Deputy Attorney General. They objected on the grounds of the risk to Blandon and the DEA investigation. Since the OIG said that it was already known that Blandon had cooperated with law enforcement was a matter of public record, and publication would cause him no additional risk. "We also argued that the report dealt with a matter of substantial public interest, and we expressed our concern that preventing release of the report would simply add fuel to the allegation that the Department was involved in a cover-up."

"the Deputy Attorney General decided to recommend that release of our report be deferred while the DEA pursued its drug investigation. On January 23, 1998, the Attorney General issued a letter invoking her authority under the Inspector General Act to delay public release of our report based on those same representations. On July 14, 1998, the Attorney General wrote us a letter stating "the law enforcement concerns that caused me to make my determination no longer warrant deferral of the public release of your report." Her letter stated that we could therefore release the report. We are doing so now, with no changes from the original.

We believe that the decision to reactivate Blandon as an informant was undertaken without adequate notice or consultation about its impact on our ability to discuss in the report the critical issue of Blandon's past cooperation with the government. This was an important part of our investigation and report.

According to the OIG, the order to defer the release was based on the Attorney General's assessment of the risk to the investigation and Blandon "versus the benefit of timely release of a report that addressed a topic of significant public concern."

== See also ==
- CIA involvement in Contra cocaine trafficking
