= Legislation for Peace and Security =

The legislation for peace and security (Japanese: 平和安全法制, Hepburn: Heiwa anzen hōsei) is a package of legislation that enables Japan to exercise the right to collective self-defence in certain situations. In 2014, an advisory panel formed by Prime Minister Shinzo Abe recommended that Article 9 of the Japanese Constitution, which prohibits the use of military force to resolve international disputes, be reinterpreted to allow Japan to mobilise the Japan Self-Defence Forces to assist an allied country that has come under attack. Legislation to facilitate this change was submitted to the Japanese parliament in May 2015. Despite some public opposition, the law was passed by the House of Representatives in July 2015, and the House of Councillors in September 2015, coming into effect in March 2016.

== Legislative history ==
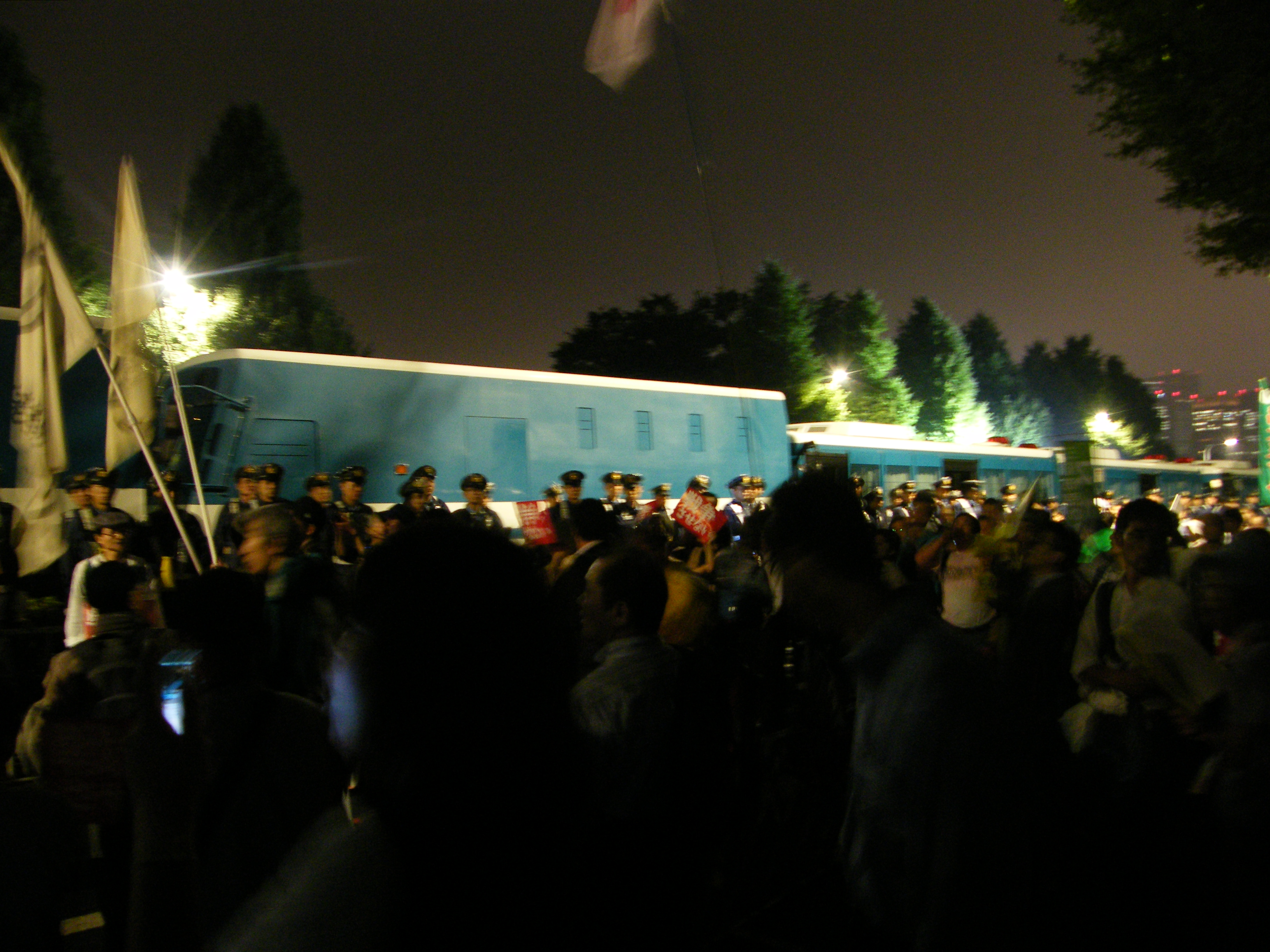
Demonstrators and police buses outside the Japanese National Diet on 18 September 2015 during a debate in the House of Councillors shortly before the Japanese military legislation was passed in the early hours of 19 September.

Shinzo Abe established the Advisory Panel on Reconstruction of the Legal Basis for Security in 2007 during his first government. The panel recommended taking measures to allow Japan to exercise the right to collective self-defence in 2008. This right is ascribed to all states by the UN Charter, but the Japanese government had previously considered its exercise impossible under Japan's existing legal framework. Permitting collective self-defence would enable Japan to mobilise the Japan Self-Defence Forces to assist an ally that had come under attack.

When Abe returned to government in 2013, the panel was revived. The government proposed a package of legislation, including one new law and revisions to 10 existing laws, to implement the panel's recommendations. This package was given the name "legislation for peace and security", and was accompanied by a reinterpretation of Article 9 of the Japanese Constitution to allow for collective self-defence. Abe originally proposed more expansive changes, but resistance from within the governing Liberal Democratic Party–Komeito coalition and opposition parliamentarians forced him to water down the proposal. The House of Representatives, the lower chamber of the National Diet, began debate on the legislation on 26 May 2015. Debate in the Diet had been scheduled to end in June, but a final vote was later delayed to September.

On 16 July 2015, the House of Representatives passed the legislation, the final version of which allowed the military to provide logistical support to allies overseas as well as armed support in circumstances when inaction would endanger "the lives and survival of the Japanese nation." The vote was passed on the strength of the majority coalition of LDP and Komeito lawmakers; members of the opposition boycotted the vote in protest.

After passage of the bill in the House of Representatives, the House of Councillors, the upper house of the National Diet, debated the bill for two months. It passed in committee on 17 September in a contentious vote in which opposition lawmakers attempted to restrain the committee chairman physically. Then, it moved to the full house for a final vote. Early in the morning on 19 September, the bill passed the full house after a delayed vote in which opposition members used various delaying tactics to draw out the process. In an effort to delay passage until after the Silver Week holiday, Yukio Edano of the Democratic Party of Japan spoke for 104 minutes (having planned to speak for four hours) in support of a no confidence motion against the cabinet, and Tarō Yamamoto of the People's Life Party attempted to delay voting by walking very slowly to the ballot box.

=== Public opposition ===
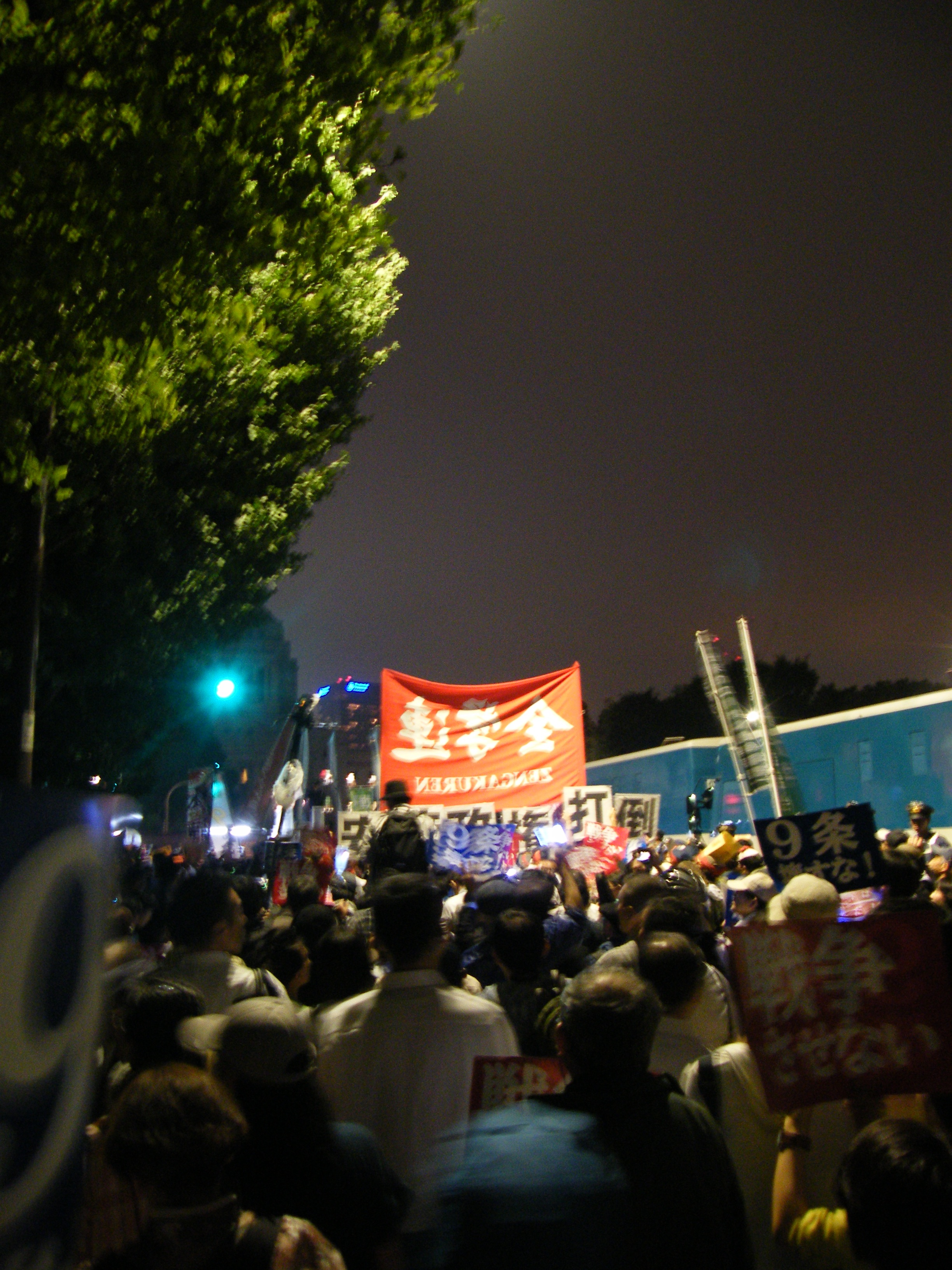
Demonstrators and police buses outside Japan's National Diet on Friday 18 September 2015 during the debate in the House of Councillors shortly before the legislation was passed in the early hours of 19 September. A Zengakuren banner is visible in the middle of the image.

The legislation was controversial within Japan. According to some polls conducted in July, at the time of the legislation's debate in the House of Representatives, two thirds of the Japanese public opposed the bills. A protest on 16 July drew an estimated 100,000 people to the National Diet building. Later protests in September ahead of the House of Councillors vote drew crowds of 10,000 to 30,000. The Abe governments's approval rating fell below its disapproval rating after the House of Representatives passed the legislation in July 2015 and again after it finally approved it in September. A slight majority of poll respondents in September thought that Japan's deterrent capabilities would not be strengthened by the legislation.

Much opposition to the legislation centered on its alleged questionable constitutionality. Repeated surveys of experts in Japan's constitution showed that more than 90% of those surveyed believed it was unconstitutional, and in June, Waseda University professor Yasuo Hasebe, in an address to the Diet with two other constitutional scholars, said that it would "considerably damage the legal stability" of Japan. After its passage, it was expected to be challenged in court, although Japan's legal system has rarely ruled against the government in security matters. A revision of the Japanese constitution to revise Article 9 would require a national referendum, which perceived current public opposition to Abe and the legislation made it thought to be unlikely to succeed in the short term. In defense of the bills, Nihon University professor Akira Momochi argued that the legislation was in keeping with the United Nations Charter, saying that the right to self-defense is "a given for international laws, and that supersedes national laws."

== Provisions ==
=== Existential crisis situation ===
The legislation amended the Armed Attack and Existential Crisis Situations Act to allow Japan to exercise collective self-defence in what is termed an "existential crisis situation" (存立危機事態, Sonritsu kiki jitai). An "existential crisis" is defined as a situation in which "an armed attack against a foreign state that is in a close relationship with Japan occurs, and, as a result, threatens Japan’s survival and poses a clear danger to overturn fundamentally its nationals’ right to life, liberty, and pursuit of happiness." While not directly mentioned in the law, the foreign state in a close relationship is generally considered to be understood to be the United States, which is Japan's only security treaty ally.

=== Other criteria ===
Even in an existential crisis situation, any exercise of collective self-defence must meet the following conditions:

- There is no other appropriate means to repel the attack and ensure Japan's survival and protect its people;
- The use of force must be limited to the minimum extent necessary;
- There must be a request for, or at least consent to, assistance by a foreign country subjected to armed attack;
- Measures taken must be reported to the UN Security Council;
- Measures are to be taken only "until the Security Council has taken the measures necessary to maintain international peace and security."

== Aftermath ==
The legislation has been effective since 29 March 2016. One of the first applications of the legislation was to authorize the Self-Defense Forces peacekeeping team in South Sudan to aid UN or foreign countries' personnel under attack in the country.

While the legislation is expected to allow Japanese and US forces to work more closely together, such as by forming integrated naval task forces to repel an invasion of Japan, Defense Minister Gen Nakatani denied that Japan would always come to the aid of the US, and Prime Minister Abe specifically ruled out the possibility of extending SDF support for the coalition fighting the Islamic State of Iraq and the Levant. It is reported that Tokyo is sending JGSDF officers to participate with the Multinational Force and Observers in April 2019 by using the new law as a basis. In December 2022 the Kishida government announced a $320bn increase in military spending, due in part to the 2022 Russian invasion of Ukraine.

During deliberations in the National Diet on 7 November, Japanese prime minister Sanae Takaichi said that a Chinese attack on Taiwan could constitute a "survival-threatening situation", allowing it to take military action in self-defence. Following these remarks, the Chinese consul general in Osaka, Xue Jian, made figuratively threatening comments against Takaichi on X, triggering a diplomatic row between the countries.

== See also ==
- Coalition of the willing (Iraq War) – Japan's military was involved in the conflict in Iraq
- Japanese Iraq Reconstruction and Support Group
