= Inter-American Conference on Problems of War and Peace =

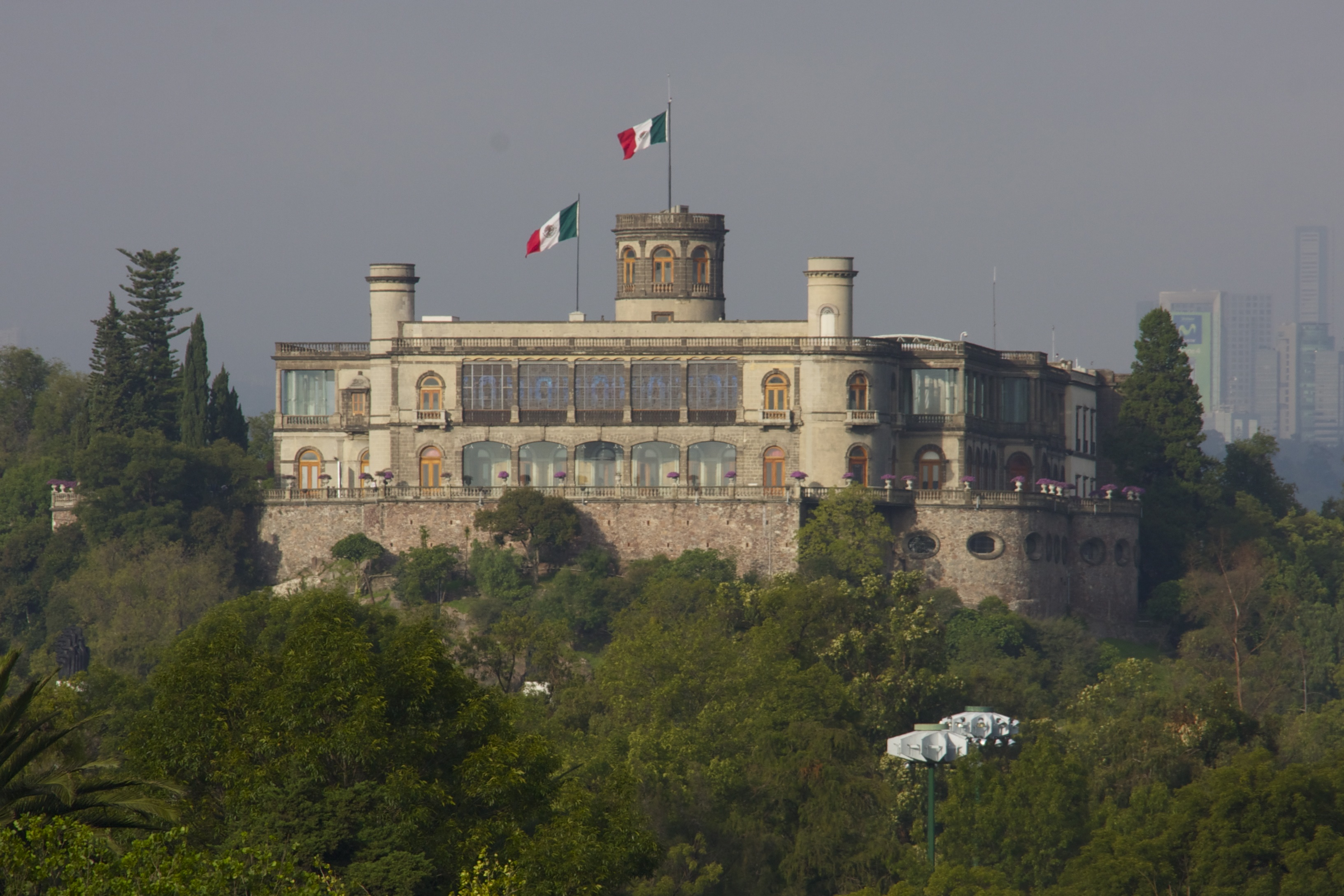
Chapultepec Castle

The Inter-American Conference on Problems of War and Peace informally known as the Chapultepec Conference, was held in Chapultepec Castle in Mexico City on February 21 to March 8, 1945, between the United States and 19 Latin American countries. Argentina was not invited because it had not declared war on the Axis Powers in World War II. The original goals were to discuss the status of Argentina, the role of the United Nations and postwar American economic aid. The second goal was postponed. There was agreement that Argentina could rejoin the inter-American community if it were to declare war on Nazi Germany. The Latin American countries feared that American commitment to the United Nations would in some ways be in conflict with the Pan-American ideals. Therefore, the conference adopted a formal resolution called the Act of Chapultepec which proclaimed the principle of collective self-defense through regional pacts. This policy was adopted by the United Nations and Article 51 of the UN charter, which authorized regional security arrangements. The provisions also provided the basis for the Rio Treaty of 1947, which was an inter-American collective security pact.

== See also ==
- Inter-American Treaty of Reciprocal Assistance of 1947
- Pan-American Conference
