= Inter-American Treaty of Reciprocal Assistance =

1947 collective defense treaty

Rio Treaty
Inter-American Treaty of Reciprocal Assistance
(in other official languages)
Spanish	Tratado Interamericano de Asistencia Recíproca
French	Traité interaméricain d'assistance réciproque
Portuguese	Tratado Interamericano de Assistência Recíproca
- Member states in green with Venezuela in light green. (Note: Venezuela denounced the treaty in 2013. However, the denunciation was disputed during the Venezuelan presidential crisis. As of July 2019, reincorporation was approved by the National Assembly and ratified by the OAS.)
- Signed: 2 September 1947
- Location: Rio de Janeiro
- Effective: 3 December 1948
- Condition: Ratification by two-thirds of the signatory states
- Signatories: 23
- Parties: 18
- Depositary: Pan American Union
- Languages: English, French, Portuguese, and Spanish

The Inter-American Treaty of Reciprocal Assistance (commonly known as the Rio Treaty, the Rio Pact, the Treaty of Reciprocal Assistance, or by the Spanish-language acronym TIAR from Tratado Interamericano de Asistencia Recíproca) is an intergovernmental collective security agreement signed in 1947 in Rio de Janeiro, Brazil, at a meeting of the American states.

The central principle contained in its articles is that an attack against one is to be considered an attack against them all; this was known as the "hemispheric defense" doctrine. Despite this, several members have breached the treaty on multiple occasions.

The treaty was initially created in 1947 and came into force in 1948, in accordance with Article 22 of the treaty. The Bahamas was the most recent country to sign and ratify it in 1982.

== Background ==
The United States maintained a hemispheric defense policy relative to European influence under the Monroe Doctrine from 1823 onward, and became increasingly interventionist following the 1904 promulgation of the Roosevelt Corollary. During the 1930s the United States had been alarmed by Axis overtures suggesting military cooperation with Latin American governments; apparent strategic threats against the Panama Canal were of particular concern. These were discussed in a series of meetings of the International Conference of American States and at the 1936 Inter-American Conference for the Maintenance of Peace. During World War II, the American government had been able to secure support for the Allies from all individual governments in the Americas except Uruguay (which remained neutral until 22 February 1945) and Argentina (which had difficult relations with the Allied powers from 1944 to 1945 but declared war on the Axis on 27 March 1945). Some countries had signed the Declaration by United Nations in early 1942 and more had signed by the end of 1945.

However, Latin American countries were largely sidelined from the Allied discussions of a postwar security order, held at Dumbarton Oaks from August to October 1944. The Brazilian Ambassador to Washington, Carlos Martins Pereira e Souza, "protested the violation of inter-American norms of consultation in the preparation of postwar plans." These protests led to a series of consultations as well as to a Mexican proposal for an inter-American meeting. At the Inter-American Conference on the Problems of War and Peace, at Chapultepec Castle in Mexico City during February and March 1945, discussions of the post-war world order were held by the US Secretary of State and by the foreign secretaries of all the Latin American countries except El Salvador and Argentina, resulting in the Act of Chapultepec of 6 March 1945. The Act included a framework for the negotiation of a regional security treaty. It also shaped Latin American pressure during the United Nations conference in San Francisco for clauses in the UN Charter to facilitate regional collective defense, under Article 51.

Initially, the security conference was planned to be held in Rio de Janeiro in October 1945 but it was postponed to March 1946. The March 1946 date was also postponed indefinitely. Disputes between the United States and Argentina's Juan Perón (President from 4 June 1946) led to the delays. The American concern, alongside that of some countries in South America regarding Peronism raised the possibility of including collective intervention to preserve democracy in the security conference. During the delay, global tensions between the United States and Soviet Union grew. In light of the developing Cold War and following the statement of the Truman Doctrine on 12 March 1947, the United States wished to make those new anti-communist commitments permanent, as did many anti-communist leaders in Latin America.

The following year, in 1948, delegates gathered in Bogotá, Colombia, where they passed the charter of the Organization of American States (OAS). The OAS was created to oversee different functions beyond defense. The OAS functioned through debate and voting instead of the like-mindedness that characterized NATO.

== History ==
=== Signing ===
The Inter-American Treaty of Reciprocal Assistance was the first of many so-called "mutual security agreements", and the formalization of the Act of Chapultepec. The treaty was adopted by the original signatories on 2 September 1947 in Rio de Janeiro (hence the colloquial name "Rio Treaty"). It came into force on 3 December 1948 and was registered with the United Nations on 20 December 1948. With the exceptions of Trinidad and Tobago (1967) and the Bahamas (1982), no countries that became independent after 1947 have joined the treaty; Canada is yet to become a member, though it already has separate defense commitments with the United States.

=== Cold War ===
As revolutionary and nationalist governments spread through Latin America through the 1950s and 1960s, the fear of a shared enemy that was experienced during WWII dissipated and the idea of defensive cooperation became strained. According to Slater, many Latin American governments participating in the Treaty sought "to insulate the hemisphere from rather than involve it in world conflict", though the United States pushed the smaller countries towards confrontation with its ideological adversaries. Latin American governments then began to view inter-American collaboration as bending to the will of the United States, forfeiting their sovereignty. In 1962 American states had found it necessary to break diplomatic relations with the Government of Cuba. The Report of the Inter-American Peace Committee to the Eighth Meeting of Consultation of Ministers of Foreign Affairs suggested that the activity the countries of the Sino-Soviet bloc and the Cuban government had with America was described as a serious violation of fundamental principles of the inter-American system.

Though the Cold War overtones of the Rio Treaty became increasingly evident, during the immediate post-war years, Long argues that it was more closely tied to pre-WWII regional antecedents and, even, Latin American diplomatic pressure. Long states, "Despite many Latin American concerns about the United States' ultimately interventionist nature, Latin American diplomats cited the Monroe Doctrine and United States-led Pan-Americanism in support of a grand bargain that would extend and institutionalize US engagement while restricting unilateralism." However, the United States' often considered adherence to the Treaty's principles of nonintervention as secondary to its Cold War concerns.

Though the action of the United States during the 1954 Guatemalan coup d'état and the 1961 Bay of Pigs Invasion raised questions among Latin American governments, the unilateral approach of the United States invading the Dominican Republic in 1965 during the Dominican Civil War, before the OAS's Inter-American Peace Force was organized, caused many members to believe that the United States did not respect the ideals of multilateralism. Conversely during the Falklands War in 1982, the United States favored the United Kingdom arguing that Argentina had been the aggressor and because Argentina had not been attacked, as did Chile and Colombia. This was seen by most Latin American countries as the final failure of the treaty. Due to this, by the beginning of 1988 sixteen Latin American countries had become full members of the Non-Aligned Movement, while another eight countries were observers and supported to different extents. The sixteen countries were Argentina, Belize, Bolivia, Chile, Colombia, Cuba, Ecuador, Grenada, Guyana, Jamaica, Nicaragua, Panama, Peru, St. Lucia, Suriname, and Trinidad-Tobago. The eight that supported were Barbados, Brazil, Costa Rica, Dominica, El Salvador, Mexico, Uruguay, and Venezuela.

=== 21st century ===
During a speech he made on 7 September 2001, the Mexican president, Vicente Fox Quesada, pointed out the necessity of having a multidimensional and modern security structure that responds to the real needs of the American hemisphere. He pointed out that when the TIAR was created in 1947 it was a result of the conditions from World War II. Since then it has been overtaken by a global system in which the vulnerability of nations does not lie solely in military or ideological threats. In September 2002, citing the Falklands example and anticipating the invasion of Iraq, Mexico formally withdrew from the treaty; after the requisite two years, in September 2004, Mexico ceased to be a signatory. In 2008, the Union of South American Nations (UNASUR) created a new regional security council to manage their own defensive objectives. On 5 June 2012, Bolivarian Alliance for the Americas (ALBA) countries Bolivia, Ecuador, Nicaragua, and Venezuela, under the leadership of leftist governments, initiated the retirement from the TIAR, a decision which the Obama administration described as "unfortunate" but respected. The treaty was officially denounced by Nicaragua on 20 September 2012, Bolivia on 17 October 2012, Venezuela on 14 May 2013, and Ecuador on 19 February 2014.

== Invocations and considerations ==
The treaty was invoked numerous times during the 1950s and 1960s, in particular the unanimous support of the United States' naval blockade during the Cuban Missile Crisis. In 2001, the United States invoked the Rio Treaty after the September 11 attacks.

In 2019, during a presidential crisis in Venezuela between incumbent President Nicolás Maduro and president of the opposition-led National Assembly of Venezuela Juan Guaidó, the latter opened talks on rejoining TIAR. On 11 May, Guaidó sent a letter to Organization of American States (OAS) secretary Luis Almagro requesting that Venezuela be reinstated. On 29 May 2019, the National Assembly approved its return to the Treaty in a preliminary discussion. The National Assembly reiterated its approval to return to the treaty in July 2019. As in 2024, due to the result of the elections in Venezuela, citizens have been collecting signatures to activate the TIAR in view of the crisis being experienced, which is being viewed as fraud.

== Members ==
A clickable Euler diagram showing the relationships between various multinational organizations in the Americas

Current members:

- Argentina (1948–present)
- The Bahamas (1982–present)
- Brazil (1948–present)
- Chile (1948–present)
- Colombia (1948–present)
- Costa Rica (1948–present)
- Dominican Republic (1948–present)
- El Salvador (1948–present)
- Guatemala (1948–present)
- Haiti (1948–present)
- Honduras (1948–present)
- Panama (1948–present)
- Paraguay (1948–present)
- Peru (1948–present)
- Trinidad and Tobago (1967–present)
- United States (1948–present)
- Uruguay (1948–2019, 2020–present) (Note: Uruguay denounced the treaty in 2019. However, the denunciation was withdrawn in 2020.)
- Venezuela (1948–2015, 2019–present)

Suspended members:

- Cuba (1948–1962) (Note: Cuba was suspended from the rights and obligations of the treaty in 1962.)

Former members:

- Bolivia (1948–2014) (Note: Bolivia denounced the treaty in 2012.)
- Ecuador (1948–2016) (Note: Ecuador denounced the treaty in 2014.)
- Mexico (1948–2004) (Note: Mexico denounced the treaty in 2002.)
- Nicaragua (1948–2014) (Note: Nicaragua denounced the treaty in 2012.)

== See also ==
- Americas Counter Cartel Coalition
- Collective Security Treaty Organization
- Inter-American Conference on Problems of War and Peace of 1945
- Inter-American Defense Board
- Inter-American Peace Force
- Latin America–United States relations
- Military alliance
- Mutual Defense Assistance Act
- North Atlantic Treaty Organization
- SICOFAA
