= Nicaragua v. United States =

1986 International Court of Justice case

- Court: International Court of Justice
- Full case name: Case Concerning the Military and Paramilitary Activities in and Against Nicaragua (Nicaragua v. United States of America)
- Decided: June 27, 1986
- Citation: 1986 I.C.J. 14

Court membership
- Judges sitting: Nagendra Singh, Guy Ledreit de Lacharrière, Roberto Ago, Mohammed Bedjaoui, Taslim Olawale Elias, Manfred Lachs, Kéba Mbaye, Ni Zhengyu, Shigeru Oda, José María Ruda, Stephen Schwebel, José Sette-Camara, Robert Jennings, Claude-Albert Colliard (ad hoc)

Case opinions
- Separate Opinion: Nagendra Singh; Separate Opinion: Manfred Lachs; Separate Opinion: José María Ruda; Separate Opinion: Taslim Olawale Elias; Separate Opinion: Roberto Ago; Separate Opinion: José Sette-Camara; Separate Opinion: Ni Zhengyu; Dissent: Shigeru Oda; Dissent: Stephen Schwebel; Dissent: Robert Jennings

The Case Concerning the Military and Paramilitary Activities in and Against Nicaragua (Nicaragua v. United States of America) (1986) was a case where the International Court of Justice (ICJ) held that the U.S. had violated international law by supporting the Contras in their rebellion against the Sandinistas and by mining Nicaragua's harbors. The case was decided in favor of Nicaragua and against the United States with the awarding of reparations to Nicaragua.

The Court had 15 final decisions upon which it voted. The Court found in its verdict that the United States was "in breach of its obligations under customary international law not to use force against another State", "not to intervene in its affairs", "not to violate its sovereignty", "not to interrupt peaceful maritime commerce", and "in breach of its obligations under Article XIX of the Treaty of Friendship, Commerce and Navigation between the Parties signed at Managua on 21 January 1956." In Statement 9, the Court stated that while the U.S. encouraged human rights violations by the Contras by the CIA-authored manual entitled Psychological Operations in Guerrilla Warfare, this did not make such acts attributable to the U.S.

The United States refused to participate in the proceedings, arguing that the ICJ lacked jurisdiction to hear the case. The U.S. also blocked enforcement of the judgment by the United Nations Security Council and thereby prevented Nicaragua from obtaining any compensation. Nicaragua, under the later, post-FSLN government of Violeta Chamorro, withdrew the complaint from the court in September 1992 following a repeal of the law which had required the country to seek compensation.

== Background and history of US intervention in Nicaragua ==
The first armed intervention by the United States in Nicaragua occurred under President William Howard Taft. In 1909, he ordered the overthrow of Nicaraguan President José Santos Zelaya. During August and September 1912, a contingent of 2,300 U.S. Marines landed at the port of Corinto and occupied León and the railway line to Granada. A pro-U.S. government was formed under the occupation. The 1914 Bryan–Chamorro Treaty granted perpetual canal rights to the U.S. in Nicaragua and was signed ten days before the U.S.-operated Panama Canal opened for use, thus preventing anyone from building a competing canal in Nicaragua without U.S. permission.

In 1927, under Augusto César Sandino, a major peasant uprising was launched against both the U.S. occupation and the Nicaraguan establishment. In 1933, the Marines withdrew and left the Nicaraguan National Guard in charge of internal security and elections. In 1934, Anastasio Somoza García, the head of the National Guard, ordered his forces to capture and murder Sandino. In 1937, Somoza assumed the presidency, while still in control of the National Guard, and established a dictatorship that his family controlled until 1979.

The downfall of the regime is attributed to its embezzlement of millions of dollars in foreign aid that was given to the country in response to the devastating 1972 earthquake. Many moderate supporters of the dictatorship began abandoning it in the face of growing revolutionary sentiment. The Sandinista (FSLN) movement organized relief, began to expand its influence and assumed the leadership of the revolution. A popular uprising brought the FSLN to power in 1979. The United States had long been opposed to the socialist FSLN, and after the revolution the Carter administration moved quickly to support the Somocistas with financial and material aid. When Ronald Reagan took office, he augmented the direct support to an anti-Sandinista group, called the Contras, which included factions loyal to the former dictatorship. When Congress prohibited further funding to the Contras, Oliver North continued the funding through arms sales that were also prohibited by Congress.

== Nicaragua's submissions ==
Nicaragua charged:

(a) That the United States, in recruiting, training, arming, equipping, financing, supplying and otherwise encouraging, supporting, aiding, and directing military and paramilitary actions in and against Nicaragua, had violated its treaty obligations to Nicaragua under:

Article 2 (4) of the United Nations Charter;
Articles 18 and 20 of the Charter of the Organization of American States;
Article 8 of the Convention on the Rights and Duties of States;
Article I, Third, of the Convention concerning the Duties and Rights of States in the Event of Civil Strife.

(b) That the United States had breached customary international law by

1. violating the sovereignty of Nicaragua by:

armed attacks against Nicaragua by air, land and sea;
incursions into Nicaraguan territorial waters;
aerial trespass into Nicaraguan airspace;
efforts by direct and indirect means to coerce and intimidate the Government of Nicaragua.

2. using force and the threat of force against Nicaragua.
3. intervening in the internal affairs of Nicaragua.
4. infringing upon the freedom of the high seas and interrupting peaceful maritime commerce.
5. killing, wounding and kidnapping citizens of Nicaragua.

Nicaragua demanded that all such actions cease and that the United States had an obligation to pay reparations to the government for damage to their people, property, and economy.

It is noteworthy that the United States, the respondent party, was the only member that put forward arguments against the validity of the judgment of the court, arguing that it passed a decision that it "had neither the jurisdiction nor the competence to render." Members that sided with the United States in opposing Nicaragua's claims did not challenge the court's jurisdiction, its findings, nor the substantive merits of the case.

== Judgment ==
The lengthy judgment first listed 291 points, among them that the United States had been involved in the "unlawful use of force". The violations included attacks on Nicaraguan facilities and naval vessels, the mining of Nicaraguan ports, the invasion of Nicaraguan air space, and the training, arming, equipping, financing and supplying of forces (the "Contras") and seeking to overthrow Nicaragua's Sandinista government. This was followed by the statements that the judges voted on.

=== Findings ===
The court found evidence of an arms flow between Nicaragua and insurgents in El Salvador between 1979 and 1981. However, there was not enough evidence to show that the Nicaraguan government was imputable for this or that the US response was proportional. The court also found that certain transborder incursions into the territory of Guatemala and Costa Rica, in 1982, 1983 and 1984, were imputable to the Government of Nicaragua. However, neither Guatemala nor Costa Rica had made any request for US intervention; El Salvador did in 1984, well after the US had intervened unilaterally.

"As regards El Salvador, the Court considers that in customary international law the provision of arms to the opposition in another State does not constitute an armed attack on that State. As regards Honduras and Costa Rica, the Court states that, in the absence of sufficient information as to the transborder incursions into the territory of those two States from Nicaragua, it is difficult to decide whether they amount, singly or collectively, to an armed attack by Nicaragua. The Court finds that neither these incursions nor the alleged supply of arms may be relied on as justifying the exercise of the right of collective self-defence."

Regarding human rights violations by the Contras, "The Court has to determine whether the relationship of the contras to the United States Government was such that it would be right to equate the Contras, for legal purposes, with an organ of the United States Government, or as acting on behalf of that Government. The Court considers that the evidence available to it is insufficient to demonstrate the total dependence of the Contras on United States aid. A partial dependency, the exact extent of which the Court cannot establish, may be inferred from the fact that the leaders were selected by the United States, and from other factors such as the organisation, training and equipping of the force, planning of operations, the choosing of targets and the operational support provided. There is no clear evidence that the United States actually exercised such a degree of control as to justify treating the contras as acting on its behalf... Having reached the above conclusion, the Court takes the view that the Contras remain responsible for their acts, in particular the alleged violations by them of humanitarian law. For the United States to be legally responsible, it would have to be proved that that State had effective control of the operations in the course of which the alleged violations were committed."

The Court concluded that the United States was subject to the Court's jurisdiction. The Court had ruled on November 26, 1984 by 11 votes to 1 that it had jurisdiction in the case on the basis of either Article 36 of the Statute of the International Court of Justice or the 1956 Treaty of Friendship, Commerce and Navigation between the United States and Nicaragua. The Charter provides that it is for the Court itself to decide whether it has jurisdiction, and that each member of the United Nations undertakes to comply with the decision of the Court. The Court also ruled by unanimity that the present case was admissible. The United States then announced that it had "decided not to participate in further proceedings in this case." After the Court's jurisdictional decision, the United States withdrew its consent to the Court's compulsory jurisdiction, in part because Nicaragua had not accepted compulsory jurisdiction except for this case, and mostly because few nations ever had (and all who did accept compulsory jurisdiction did so with significant conditions and reservations). The Declaration of acceptance of compulsory jurisdiction of the International Court of Justice terminated after a 6-month notice of termination delivered by the Secretary of State to the United Nations on October 7, 1985.

Although the Court called on the United States to "cease and to refrain" from the unlawful use of force against Nicaragua and stated that the US was "in breach of its obligation under customary international law not to use force against another state" and ordered it to pay reparations, the United States refused to comply. As a permanent member of the Security Council, the U.S. has been able to block any enforcement mechanism attempted by Nicaragua. On November 3, 1986 the United Nations General Assembly passed, by a vote of 94-3 (El Salvador, Israel and the US voted against), a non-binding resolution urging the US to comply.

=== The ruling ===
On June 27, 1986, the Court made the following ruling:

The Court

1. Decides that in adjudicating the dispute brought before it by the Application filed by the Republic of Nicaragua on 9 April 1984, the Court is required to apply the "multilateral treaty reservation" contained in proviso (c) to the declaration of acceptance of jurisdiction made under Article 36, paragraph 2, of the Statute of the Court by the Government of the United States of America deposited on 26 August 1946;
2. Rejects the justification of collective self-defense maintained by the United States of America in connection with the military and paramilitary activities in and against Nicaragua the subject of this case;
3. Decides that the United States of America, by training, arming, equipping, financing and supplying the contra forces or otherwise encouraging, supporting and aiding military and paramilitary activities in and against Nicaragua, has acted, against the Republic of Nicaragua, in breach of its obligation under customary international law not to intervene in the affairs of another State;
4. Decides that the United States of America, by certain attacks on Nicaraguan territory in 1983–1984, namely attacks on Puerto Sandino on 13 September and 14 October 1983, an attack on Corinto on 10 October 1983; an attack on Potosi Naval Base on 4/5 January 1984, an attack on San Juan del Sur on 7 March 1984; attacks on patrol boats at Puerto Sandino on 28 and 30 March 1984; and an attack on San Juan del Norte on 9 April 1984; and further by those acts of intervention referred to in subparagraph (3) hereof which involve the use of force, has acted, against the Republic of Nicaragua, in breach of its obligation under customary international law not to use force against another State;
5. Decides that the United States of America, by directing or authorizing overflights of Nicaraguan territory, and by the acts imputable to the United States referred to in subparagraph (4) hereof, has acted, against the Republic of Nicaragua, in breach of its obligation under customary international law not to violate the sovereignty of another State;
6. Decides that, by laying mines in the internal or territorial waters of the Republic of Nicaragua during the first months of 1984, the United States of America has acted, against the Republic of Nicaragua, in breach of its obligations under customary international law not to use force against another State, not to intervene in its affairs, not to violate its sovereignty and not to interrupt peaceful maritime commerce;
7. Decides that, by the acts referred to in subparagraph (6) hereof the United States of America has acted, against the Republic of Nicaragua, in breach of its obligations under Article XIX of the Treaty of Friendship, Commerce and Navigation between the United States of America and the Republic of Nicaragua signed at Managua on 21 January 1956;
8. Decides that the United States of America, by failing to make known the existence and location of the mines laid by it, referred to in subparagraph (6) hereof, has acted in breach of its obligations under customary international law in this respect;
9. Finds that the United States of America, by producing in 1983 a manual entitled 'Operaciones sicológicas en guerra de guerrillas', and disseminating it to Contra forces, has encouraged the commission by them of acts contrary to general principles of humanitarian law; but does not find a basis for concluding that any such acts which may have been committed are imputable to the United States of America as acts of the United States of America;
10. Decides that the United States of America, by the attacks on Nicaraguan territory referred to in subparagraph (4) hereof, and by declaring a general embargo on trade with Nicaragua on 1 May 1985, has committed acts calculated to deprive of its object and purpose the Treaty of Friendship, Commerce and Navigation between the Parties signed at Managua on 21 January 1956;
11. Decides that the United States of America, by the attacks on Nicaraguan territory referred to in subparagraph (4) hereof, and by declaring a general embargo on trade with Nicaragua on 1 May 1985, has acted in breach of its obligations under Article XIX of the Treaty of Friendship, Commerce and Navigation between the Parties signed at Managua on 21 January 1956;
12. Decides that the United States of America is under a duty immediately to cease and to refrain from all such acts as may constitute breaches of the foregoing legal obligations;
13. Decides that the United States of America is under an obligation to make reparation to the Republic of Nicaragua for all injury caused to Nicaragua by the breaches of obligations under customary international law enumerated above;
14. Decides that the United States of America is under an obligation to make reparation to the Republic of Nicaragua for all injury caused to Nicaragua by the breaches of the Treaty of Friendship, Commerce and Navigation between the Parties signed at Managua on 21 January 1956;
15. Decides that the form and amount of such reparation, failing agreement between the Parties, will be settled by the Court, and reserves for this purpose the subsequent procedure in the case;
16. Recalls to both Parties their obligation to seek a solution to their disputes by peaceful means in accordance with international law.

=== Legal clarification and importance ===
The ruling did in many ways clarify issues surrounding prohibition of the use of force and the right of self-defence. Arming and training the Contra was found to be in breach with principles of non-intervention and prohibition of use of force, as was laying mines in Nicaraguan territorial waters.

Nicaragua's dealings with the armed opposition in El Salvador, although it might be considered a breach with the principle of non-intervention and the prohibition of use of force, did not constitute "an armed attack", which is the wording in article 51 justifying the right of self-defence.

The Court considered also the United States claim to be acting in collective self-defence of El Salvador and found the conditions for this not reached as El Salvador never requested the assistance of the United States on the grounds of self-defence.

In regards to laying mines, "...the laying of mines in the waters of another State without any warning or notification is not only an unlawful act but also a breach of the principles of humanitarian law underlying the Hague Convention No. VIII of 1907."

=== How the judges voted ===
Votes of Judges – Nicaragua v. United States

	Operative Paragraph															
Judge	1	2	3	4	5	6	7	8	9	10	11	12	13	14	15	16
(India) President Nagendra Singh	Yes	Yes	Yes	Yes	Yes	Yes	Yes	Yes	Yes	Yes	Yes	Yes	Yes	Yes	Yes	Yes
(France) Vice-President de Lacharrière	Yes	Yes	Yes	Yes	Yes	Yes	Yes	Yes	Yes	Yes	Yes	Yes	Yes	Yes	Yes	Yes
(Italy) Judge Ago	Yes	Yes	Yes	Yes	Yes	Yes	Yes	Yes	Yes	Yes	Yes	Yes	Yes	Yes	Yes	Yes
(Nigeria) Judge Elias	No	Yes	Yes	Yes	Yes	Yes	Yes	Yes	Yes	Yes	Yes	Yes	Yes	Yes	Yes	Yes
(Poland) Judge Lachs	Yes	Yes	Yes	Yes	Yes	Yes	Yes	Yes	Yes	Yes	Yes	Yes	Yes	Yes	Yes	Yes
(Senegal) Judge Mbaye	Yes	Yes	Yes	Yes	Yes	Yes	Yes	Yes	Yes	Yes	Yes	Yes	Yes	Yes	Yes	Yes
(China) Judge Ni	No	Yes	Yes	Yes	Yes	Yes	Yes	Yes	Yes	Yes	Yes	Yes	Yes	Yes	Yes	Yes
(Japan) Judge Oda	Yes	No	No	No	No	No	Yes	No	No	No	No	No	No	Yes	Yes	Yes
(Argentina) Judge Ruda	No	Yes	Yes	Yes	Yes	Yes	Yes	Yes	Yes	Yes	Yes	Yes	Yes	Yes	Yes	Yes
(United States) Judge Schwebel	Yes	No	No	No	No	No	No	Yes	Yes	No	No	No	No	No	No	Yes
(Brazil) Judge Sette-Camara	No	Yes	Yes	Yes	Yes	Yes	Yes	Yes	Yes	Yes	Yes	Yes	Yes	Yes	Yes	Yes
(United Kingdom) Judge Sir Robert Jennings	Yes	No	No	No	No	No	Yes	Yes	Yes	No	No	No	No	Yes	Yes	Yes
(Nicaragua) Judge ad hoc Colliard	Yes	Yes	Yes	Yes	Yes	Yes	Yes	Yes	Yes	Yes	Yes	Yes	Yes	Yes	Yes	Yes

=== Dissent ===
Judge Schwebel argued that the Sandinista government came to power with support of foreign intervention similar to what it was now complaining about. He argued that the Sandinista government achieved international recognition and received large amounts of foreign aid in exchange for commitments they subsequently violated. He cited evidence that the Sandinista government had supported the rebels in El Salvador and wrote that Nicaragua's own CIA witness contradicted their assertions that they had never at any point supported the rebels in El Salvador. The CIA witness said that there was no evidence of weapon shipments since early 1981, but Schwebel argued that he could not credibly explain why opponents of Contra aid such as Congressman Boland, who also saw the evidence, believed that weapon shipments were ongoing. He further wrote that Daniel Ortega publicly admitted such shipments in statements in 1985 and 1986. He said there was no dispute that the leadership of the rebels operated in Nicaragua from time to time.

He stated that in August 1981 the U.S. offered to resume aid to Nicaragua and to not support regime change in exchange for Nicaraguan commitments to not support the rebels in El Salvador. These proposals were rejected by the Sandinistas, and Schwebel argued that the U.S. was entitled to take action in collective self-defense with El Salvador by authorizing Contra aid in December 1981. He stated that further U.S. proposals to resolve the issue made in early 1982 were also ignored by the Sandinistas. The Sandinista government in 1983 began advancing proposals in which it would undertake not to support the rebels. Schwebel said that these were coupled with demands that the U.S. cease supporting the lawful government of El Salvador. He wrote that since early 1985 the U.S. had increasingly made regime change a primary objective but that this was not inconsistent with self-defense because it was reasonable to believe that Nicaragua would not maintain any commitments unless Sandinista power was diluted.

The judge said that both sides of the wars in Nicaragua and El Salvador had committed atrocities. He said the U.S. mining of Nicaraguan harbors was unlawful in regard to third parties, but not Nicaragua.

== Certain witnesses against the US ==
=== First witness: Commander Luis Carrión ===
The first witness called by Nicaragua was Nicaragua's first Vice Minister of the Interior, Commander Luis Carrion. Commander Carrion had overall responsibility for state security and was in charge of all government operations in the "principal war zone". He was responsible for monitoring United States involvement in military and paramilitary activities against Nicaragua, directing Nicaragua's military and intelligence efforts against the contra guerrillas.

Commander Carrion began by explaining the condition of the contras prior to United States' aid in December 1981. Commander Carrion stated that the contras consisted of insignificant bands of poorly armed and poorly organized members of Somoza's National Guard, who carried out uncoordinated border raids and rustled cattle (presumably for food).

In December 1981, the U.S. Congress authorized an initial appropriation of 19 million dollars to finance paramilitary operations in Nicaragua and elsewhere in Central America. Because of this aid, Commander Carrion stated that the contras began to become centralized and received both training and weapons from the CIA. During 1982 the contra guerrillas engaged the Sandinista armed forces in a series of hit and run border raids and carried out a number of sabotage operations including:

1. the destruction of two key bridges in the northern part of Nicaragua, and
2. the planting of bombs in Nicaraguan civil aircraft in Mexico and in the baggage area of a Nicaraguan port.

The United States Central Intelligence Agency, and Argentine military officers financed by the CIA, were engaged in the training of the contra forces. The guerrillas received both basic infantry training as well as training in specialized sabotage and demolition for "special operation groups".

The U.S. Congress apportioned new funds for the contras to the amount of $30 million at the end of 1982. This made it possible for the contra forces to launch a military offensive against Nicaragua. According to Commander Carrion, the offensive known as "C Plan" had the objective of capturing the Nicaraguan border town of Jalapa in order to install a provisional government, which could receive international recognition. This plan failed.

After the failure of the Jalapa offensive the contras changed their tactics from frontal assaults to economic warfare against State farms, coffee plantations, grain storage centers, road junctions, etc.

The CIA began to support the contras by setting up and coordinating a communications and logistical system. The CIA supplied aircraft and the construction of airfields in the Honduran border area next to Nicaragua. This allowed the contras to carry out deep penetration raids into the more developed and populated areas of the Nicaraguan interior. U.S. Army engineers created this airfield. The purpose of these deep penetration attacks upon economic targets was to weaken the Nicaraguan economy, causing a shortages of goods.

As a part of its training program for the contras, the CIA prepared and distributed a manual entitled Psychological Operations in Guerrilla Warfare. This manual included instructions in the "use of implicit and explicit terror", and in the "selective use of violence for propaganda effects". Commander Carrion explained that the manual was given to the Contras, "All of these terrorist instructions have the main purpose of alienating the population from the Government through creating a climate of terror and fear, so that nobody would dare support the Government". The manual calls for the "neutralization" (i.e. assassination) of Sandinista local government officials, judges, etc. for purposes of intimidation. It was openly admitted by the President Reagan in a press conference that the manual had been prepared by a CIA contract employee.

After the United States Congress approved an additional $24 million aid to the contras in December 1983, a new offensive was launched, named Plan Sierra. This offensive involved approximately 7000 members of the contra forces. As in earlier attacks, the initial objective of this offensive was to capture the border town of Jalapa to install a provisional government, which the CIA informed the contras would be immediately recognized by the United States Government. But this contra offensive was also repulsed by the Nicaraguan government forces.

In the beginning of 1984, the contras made a major effort to prevent the harvesting of the coffee crop, which is one of Nicaragua's most important export products. Coffee plantations and state farms where coffee is grown were attacked, vehicles were destroyed, and coffee farmers were killed.

Commander Carrion testified that the ability of the contras to carry out military operations was completely dependent upon United States funding, training and logistical support. Carrion stated that the U.S. Government supplied the contras with uniforms, weapons, communications equipment, intelligence, training, and coordination in using this material aid.

In September 1983, CIA operatives blew up Nicaragua's only oil pipeline, which was used to transport oil from off-loading facilities to storage tanks on shore. The United States was also directly involved in a large scale sabotage operation directed against Nicaragua's oil storage facilities. This last attack was carried out by CIA contract employees termed by that organization as "Unilaterally Controlled Latin Assets" (UCLAs). The CIA personnel were also directly involved in a helicopter attack on a Nicaraguan army training camp. One of the helicopters was shot down by Nicaraguan ground fire resulting in the death of two U.S. citizens.

Commander Carrion testified that the United States was involved in the mining of Nicaragua's ports between February – April 1984. The mining operation was carried out by CIA ships directing the operation from international waters, while the actual mining was carried out by CIA employees on board speedboats operating inshore. After the mine-laying was completed the speedboats returned to the mother vessel.

Carrion stated that 3,886 people had been killed and 4,731 wounded in the four years since the contras began their attacks. Carrion estimated property damage at $375 million.

Commander Carrion stated if the United States stopped aid, support and training, this would result in the end of the contras military activities within three months. Asked why he was so sure of this, Commander Carrion answered, "Well, because the contras are an artificial force, artificially set up by the United States, that exists only because it counts on United States direction, on United States training, on United States assistance, on United States weapons, on United States everything...Without that kind of support and direction the contras would simply disband, disorganize, and thus lose their military capacity in a very short time".

=== Second witness: Dr. David MacMichael ===
David MacMichael was an expert on counter-insurgency, guerrilla warfare, and Latin American affairs, he was also a witness because he was closely involved with U.S. intelligence activities as a contract employee from March 1981 – April 1983. MacMichael worked for Stanford Research Institute, which was contracted by the U.S. Department of Defense. After this he worked two years for the CIA as a "senior estimates officer", preparing the National Intelligence Estimate. Dr. MacMichael's responsibility was centered upon Central America. He had top-secret clearance. He was qualified and authorized to have access to all relevant U.S. intelligence concerning Central America, including intelligence relating to alleged Nicaraguan support for, and arms shipments to the anti-Government insurgents in El Salvador. He took part in high level meetings of the Latin American affairs office of the CIA. Including a fall 1981 meeting, which submitted the initial plan to set up a 1500-man covert force on the Nicaraguan border, shipping arms from Nicaragua to the El Salvador insurgents. This plan was approved by President Reagan.

"The overall purpose (for the creation of the contras) was to weaken, even destabilize the Nicaraguan Government and thus reduce the menace it allegedly posed to the United States' interests in Central America..."

Contra paramilitary actions would "hopefully provoke cross-border attacks by Nicaraguan forces and thus serve to demonstrate Nicaragua's aggressive nature and possibly call into play the Organization of American States' provisions (regarding collective self-defense). It was hoped that the Nicaraguan Government would clamp down on civil liberties within Nicaragua itself, arresting its opposition, so demonstrating its allegedly inherent totalitarian nature and thus increase domestic dissent within the country, and further that there would be reaction against United States citizens, particularly against United States diplomatic personnel within Nicaragua and thus to demonstrate the hostility of Nicaragua towards the United States".

In response to repeated questions as to whether there was any substantial evidence of the supply of weapons to the guerrilla movement in El Salvador- either directly by the Nicaraguan Government itself-or with the knowledge, approval or authorization of the Nicaraguan Government of either non-official Nicaraguan sources, or by third country nationals inside or outside Nicaragua, using Nicaraguan territory for this purpose, Dr. MacMichael answered that there was no such evidence. In the opinion of the witness it would not have been possible for Nicaragua to send arms to the insurgents in El Salvador in significant amounts (as alleged by the U.S. Government) and over a prolonged period, without this being detected by the U.S. intelligence network in the area...Counsel for Nicaragua, asked the witness several times whether any detection of arms shipments by or through Nicaragua had taken place during the period he was employed by the CIA. (MacMichael) answered repeatedly that there was no such evidence. He also stated that after his employment had terminated, nothing had occurred that would cause him to change his opinion. He termed the evidence that had been publicly disclosed by the U.S. Government concerning Nicaraguan arms deliveries to the El Salvadoran insurgents as both "scanty" and "unreliable". The witness did however state that based on evidence, which had been gathered immediately prior to his employment with the CIA, evidence he had already actually seen, there was substantial evidence that arms shipments were reaching El Salvador from Nicaragua – with the probable involvement and complicity of the Nicaraguan Government – through late 1980 up until the spring of 1981....But this evidence, which most importantly had included actual seizures of weapons, which could be traced to Nicaragua, as well as documentary evidence and other sources, had completely ceased by early 1981. Since then, no evidence linking Nicaragua to shipments of arms in any substantial quantities had resumed coming in.

=== Third witness: Professor Michael Glennon ===
Mr. Glennon testified about a fact-finding mission he had conducted in Nicaragua to investigate alleged human rights violations committed by the Contra guerrillas, sponsored by the International Human Rights Law Group, and the Washington Office on Latin America. Glennon conducted the investigation with Mr. Donald T. Fox who is a New York attorney and a member of the International Commission of Jurists.

They traveled to Nicaragua, visiting the northern region where the majority of contra military operations took place. The two lawyers interviewed around 36 northern frontier residents who had direct experience with the contras. They also spoke with the U.S. Ambassador to Nicaragua, and with senior officials of the U.S. Department of State in Washington after returning to the United States.

No hearsay evidence was accepted. Professor Glennon stated that those interviewed were closely questioned, and their evidence was carefully cross-checked with available documentary evidence. Doubtful "testimonies" were rejected, and the results were published in April 1985.

The conclusions of the report were summarized by Glennon in Court:

We found that there is substantial credible evidence that the contras were engaged with some frequency in acts of terroristic violence directed at Nicaraguan civilians. These are individuals who have no connection with the war effort-persons with no economic, political or military significance. These are Individuals who are not caught in the cross-fire between Government and contra forces, but rather individuals who are deliberately targeted by the contras for acts of terror. "Terror" was used in the same sense as in recently enacted United States law, i.e. "an activity that involves a violent act or an act dangerous to human life that Is a violation or the criminal law, and appears to be intended to intimidate or coerce a civilian population, to Influence the policy of a government by intimidation or coercion, or to affect the conduct of a government by assassination or kidnapping.

In talks with U.S. State Department officials, at those in Managua U.S. Embassy, and with officials in Washington, Professor Glennon had inquired whether the U.S. Government had ever investigated human rights abuses by the contras. Professor Glennon testified that no such investigation had ever been conducted, because in the words of a ranking State Department official who he could not name, the U.S. Government maintained a policy of "intentional ignorance" on the matter. State Department officials in Washington- had admitted to Glennon that "it was clear that the level of atrocities was enormous". Those words "enormous" and "atrocities" were the ranking State Department official's words.

=== Fourth witness: Father Jean Loison ===
Father Jean Loison was a French priest who worked as a nurse in a hospital in the northern frontier region close to Honduras.

Asked whether the contras engaged in acts of violence directed against the civilian population, Father Loison answered:

Yes, I could give you several examples. Near Quilali, at about 30 kilometers east of Quilali, there was a little village called El Coco. The contras arrived, they devastated it, they destroyed and burned everything. They arrived in front of a little house and turned their machinegun fire on it, without bothering to check if there were any people inside. Two children, who had taken fright and hidden under a bed, were hit. I could say the same thing of a man and woman who were hit, this was in the little co-operative of Sacadias Olivas. It was just the same. They too had taken fright and got into bed. Unlike El Coco, the contras had just been on the attack, they had encountered resistance and were now in flight. During their flight they went into a house, and seeing that there were people there, they threw grenade. The man and the woman were killed and one of the children was injured.

About contra kidnappings:

I would say that kidnappings are one of the reasons why some of the peasants have formed themselves into groups. Here (indicates a point on the map) is Quilali. Between Quilali and Uilili, in this region to the north, there are hardly any peasants left of any age to bear arms, because they have all been carried off.

Father Loison described many examples of violence, mostly indiscriminate, directed at the civilian population in the region where he resides. The picture that emerges from his testimony is that the contras engage in brutal violation of minimum standards of humanity. He described murders of unarmed civilians, including women and children, rape followed in many instances by torture or murder, and indiscriminate terror designed to coerce the civilian population. His testimony was similar to various reports including the International Human Rights Law Group, Amnesty International, and others.

=== Fifth witness: William Hüper ===
William Hüper was Nicaragua's Minister of Finance. He testified about Nicaragua economic damage, including the loss of fuel as a result of the attack in the oil storage facilities at Corinto, the damage to Nicaragua's commerce as a result of the mining of its ports, and other economic damage.

== UN voting ==
After five vetoes in the Security Council between 1982 and 1985 of resolutions concerning the situation in Nicaragua, the United States made one final veto on 28 October 1986 (France, Thailand, and United Kingdom abstaining) of a resolution calling for full and immediate compliance with the judgment.

Nicaragua brought the matter to the U.N. Security Council, where the United States vetoed a resolution (11 to 1, 3 abstentions) calling on all states to observe international law. Nicaragua also turned to the General Assembly, which passed a resolution 94 to 3 calling for compliance with the World Court ruling. Two states, Israel and El Salvador, joined the United States in opposition. At that time, El Salvador was receiving substantial funding and military advice from the U.S., which was aiming to crush a Sandinista-like revolutionary movement by the FMLN. At the same session, Nicaragua called upon the U.N. to send an independent fact-finding mission to the border to secure international monitoring of the borders after a conflict there; the proposal was rejected by Honduras with U.S. backing. A year later, on November 12, 1987, the General Assembly again called for "full and immediate compliance" with the World Court decision. This time only Israel joined the United States in opposing adherence to the ruling.

In both 2023 and 2024, Nicaragua sent a letter to the United Nations still arguing for the obligation of the United States to compensate Nicaragua for the reparations from the 1986 ICJ court ruling.

== U.S. defense and response ==
The United States refused to participate in the merits phase of the proceedings, but the Court found that the US refusal did not prevent it from deciding the case. The Court also rejected the United States defense that its action constituted collective self-defense. The United States argued that the Court did not have jurisdiction, with U.S. ambassador to the United Nations Jeane Kirkpatrick dismissing the Court as a "semi-legal, semi-juridical, semi-political body, which nations sometimes accept and sometimes don't."

The United States had signed the treaty accepting the Court's decision as binding, but with the exception that the court would not have the power to hear cases based on multilateral treaty obligations unless it involved all parties to the treaty affected by that decision or the United States specially agreed to jurisdiction. The court found that it was obliged to apply this exception and refused to take on claims by Nicaragua based on the United Nations Charter and Organization of American States charter, but concluded that it could still decide the case based on customary international law obligations with 11-4 majority.

When a similar but crucially non-binding resolution was brought before the United Nations General Assembly on 3 November it was passed. Only El Salvador and Israel voted with the U.S. against it. El Salvador's ruling junta was at that time receiving substantial funding and military advisement from the U.S., which was aiming to crush a Sandinista-like revolutionary movement by the FMLN. In spite of this resolution, the U.S. still chose not to pay the fine.

In response to the ICJ's decision that US aid to the contra rebels violated international law, US State Department lawyer, Abraham Sofaer, said that the US would no longer recognize the ICJ's 'compulsory jurisdiction' authority. Sofaer said "We felt the Nicaragua case was an unfortunate signal to us that we should be concerned about our security interests and about the use of the court for political-public relations purposes. . . . The President does not want the court used for those purposes--at the same time, he and others in this Administration want to continue to use the court for its intended purposes". Paul Reichler, one of the lawyers representing Nicaragua in the case, said: "It's another indication that this Administration has no regard for international law--when international law conflicts with a foreign policy objective of the Administration, they will throw international law into the waste basket".

== Significance ==
=== Third-party interpretations ===
Professor of International Law, Anthony D'Amato, writing for the American Journal of International Law (Vol. 80, 1986), commented on this case, stating that "law would collapse if defendants could only be sued when they agreed to be sued, and the proper measurement of that collapse would be not just the drastically diminished number of cases but also the necessary restructuring of a vast system of legal transactions and relations predicated on the availability of courts as a last resort. There would be talk of a return to the law of the jungle." The author also notes that the case resulted in an unusual candor. A month after the announced withdrawal, Secretary of State Shultz suggested, and President Reagan later confirmed in a press conference, that the goal of U.S. policy was to overthrow the Sandinista Government of Nicaragua. Although this was what Nicaragua had alleged to be the U.S. goal, while the case was actively pending, the United States could not concede that goal without serious risk of undermining its litigating position.

== See also ==
- Iran–Contra affair
- List of International Court of Justice cases
- Psychological Operations in Guerrilla Warfare
- Hybrid warfare
