= U.S. Army and CIA interrogation manuals =

School of Americas training manual titles
Spanish titles	No. of pages	English titles
Manejo de Fuente	174	Handling of Sources
Contrainteligencia	310	Counterintelligence
Guerra Revolucionaria e Ideología Comunista	128	Revolutionary War and Communist Ideology
Terrorismo y Guerrilla Urbana	175	Terrorism and the Urban Guerrilla
Interrogacion	150	Interrogation
Inteligencia de Combate	172	Combat Intelligence
* Analisis I	90	* Analysis I
Total pages:	1169	
* No questionable or objectionable statements found.

The U.S. Army and CIA interrogation manuals are seven controversial military training manuals which were declassified by the Pentagon in 1996. In 1997, two additional CIA manuals were declassified in response to a Freedom of Information Act (FOIA) request filed by The Baltimore Sun. The manuals in question have been referred to by various media sources as the "torture manuals".

== Army manuals ==
These manuals were prepared by the U.S. military and used between 1987 and 1991 for intelligence training courses at the U.S. Army School of the Americas (SOA). Some of the material was similar to the older CIA manuals described below. The manuals were also distributed by Special Forces Mobile Training Teams to military personnel and intelligence schools in Colombia, Ecuador, El Salvador, Guatemala and Peru.

The Pentagon press release accompanying the release stated that a 1991–92 investigation into the manuals concluded that "two dozen short passages in six of the manuals, which total 1169 pages, contained material that either was not or could be interpreted not to be consistent with U.S. policy."

The Latin America Working Group criticized this: "The unstated aim of the manuals is to train Latin American militaries to identify and suppress anti-government movements. Throughout the eleven hundred pages of the manuals, there are few mentions of democracy, human rights, or the rule of law. Instead, the manuals provide detailed techniques for infiltrating social movements, interrogating suspects, surveillance, maintaining military secrecy, recruiting and retaining spies, and controlling the population. While the excerpts released by the Pentagon are a useful and not misleading selection of the most egregious passages, the ones most clearly advocating torture, execution and blackmail, they do not provide adequate insight into the manuals' highly objectionable framework. In the name of defending democracy, the manuals advocate profoundly undemocratic methods."

After this 1992 investigation, the Department of Defense discontinued the use of the manuals, directed their recovery to the extent practicable, and destroyed the copies in the field. U.S. Southern Command advised governments in Latin America that the manuals contained passages that did not represent U.S. government policy, and pursued recovery of the manuals from the governments and some individual students. Notably, David Addington and Dick Cheney retained personal copies of the training manuals.

Soon after, the U.S. Army issued the FM 34-52 Intelligence Interrogation manual, which was used until September 2006, when it was superseded by FM 2-22.3, Human Intelligence Collector Operations.

== CIA manuals ==
The U.S. Senate report on CIA torture, which detailed the contests of the manuals

The first manual, "KUBARK Counterintelligence Interrogation", dated July 1963, is the source of much of the material in the second manual. KUBARK was a U.S. Central Intelligence Agency cryptonym for the CIA itself. The cryptonym KUBARK appears in the title of a 1963 CIA document KUBARK Counterintelligence Interrogation which describes interrogation techniques, including, among other things, "coercive counterintelligence interrogation of resistant sources". This is the oldest manual, and describes the use of abusive techniques, as exemplified by two references to the use of electric shock, in addition to use of threats and fear, sensory deprivation, and isolation.

The second manual, "Human Resource Exploitation Training Manual – 1983", was used in at least seven U.S. training courses conducted in Latin American countries, including Honduras, between 1982 and 1987. According to a declassified 1989 report prepared for the Senate intelligence committee, the 1983 manual was developed from notes of a CIA interrogation course in Honduras.

Both manuals deal exclusively with interrogation. Both manuals have an entire chapter devoted to "coercive techniques". These manuals recommend arresting suspects early in the morning by surprise, blindfolding them, and stripping them naked. Suspects should be held incommunicado and should be deprived of any kind of normal routine in eating and sleeping. Interrogation rooms should be windowless, soundproof, dark and without toilets.

The manuals advise that torture techniques can backfire and that the threat of pain is often more effective than pain itself. The manuals describe coercive techniques to be used "to induce psychological regression in the subject by bringing a superior outside force to bear on his will to resist." These techniques include prolonged constraint, prolonged exertion, extremes of heat, cold, or moisture, deprivation of food or sleep, disrupting routines, solitary confinement, threats of pain, deprivation of sensory stimuli, hypnosis, and use of drugs or placebos.

Between 1984 and 1985, after congressional committees began questioning training techniques being used by the CIA in Latin America, the 1983 manual went through substantial revision. In 1985 a page advising against using coercive techniques was inserted at the front of Human Resource Exploitation Training Manual. Handwritten changes were also introduced haphazardly into the text. For example, "While we do not stress the use of coercive techniques, we do want to make you aware of them and the proper way to use them", has been altered to, "While we deplore the use of coercive techniques, we do want to make you aware of them so that you may avoid them." (p. A-2) But the entire chapter on coercive techniques is still provided with some items crossed out.

The same manual states the importance of knowing local laws regarding detention but then notes, "Illegal detention always requires prior HQS [headquarters] approval." (p. B-2)

The two manuals were completely declassified and released to the public in May 2004, and are now available online.

=== The 1983 manual and Battalion 3-16 ===
In 1983, the Human Resource Exploitation Training Manual – 1983 methods were used by the U.S.-trained Honduran Battalion 3-16.

On January 24, 1997, KUBARK Counterintelligence Interrogation and Human Resource Exploitation Training Manual - 1983 were declassified in response to a FOIA request filed by the Baltimore Sun in 1994. The Baltimore Sun was investigating "kidnapping, torture and murder" committed by the Honduran Battalion 3-16 death squad. The documents were released only after the Baltimore Sun had threatened to sue the CIA.

In the June 11 to 18, 1995 four-part series, The Baltimore Sun printed excerpts of an interview with Florencio Caballero, a former member of Battalion 3-16. Caballero said CIA instructors taught him to discover what his prisoners loved and what they hated, "If a person did not like cockroaches, then that person might be more cooperative if there were cockroaches running around the room" The methods taught in the 1983 manual and those used by Battalion 3-16 in the early 1980s show unmistakable similarities. In 1983, Caballero attended a CIA "human resources exploitation or interrogation course," according to declassified testimony by Richard Stolz, who was the deputy director for operations at the time, before the June 1988 Senate Select Committee on Intelligence. The manual advises an interrogator to "manipulate the subject's environment, to create unpleasant or intolerable situations."

The manual gives the suggestion that prisoners be deprived of sleep and food, and made to maintain rigid positions, such as standing at attention for long periods. Ines Consuelo Murillo, who spent 78 days in Battalion 3-16's secret jails in 1983, said she was given no food or water for days, and one of her captors entered her room every 10 minutes and poured water over her head to keep her from sleeping.

The "Human Resource Exploitation Training Manual -- 1983" gives the suggestion that interrogators show the prisoner letters from home to give the prisoner the impression that the prisoner's relatives are in danger or suffering.

The Baltimore Sun reported that former Battalion 3-16 member Jose Barrera said he was taught interrogation methods by U.S. instructors in 1983: "The first thing we would say is that we know your mother, your younger brother. And better you cooperate, because if you don't, we're going to bring them in and rape them and torture them and kill them."

== See also ==
- Project MKUltra
- Psychological Operations in Guerrilla Warfare
- Simple Sabotage Field Manual
- Torture and the United States
- Western Hemisphere Institute for Security Cooperation
- White torture
