= Collective self-defence =

Concept in international law

International law recognises a right to collective self-defence. This allows a state to come to the aid of another state that has come under attack by a foreign power, in an exception to the prohibition on the use of force in international relations. Collective self-defence is enumerated as an inherent right in the Chapter VII, Article 51 of the Charter of the United Nations.

== Concept ==
Collective self-defence refers to a situation in which one or more states take military action to assist another state that has come under attack by a foreign power. Chapter VII, Article 51 of the UN Charter enumerates an inherent right to both individual and collective self-defence, in an exception to the general prohibition on the use of force in international relations.

Nothing in the present Charter shall impair the inherent right of collective or individual self-defence if an armed attack occurs against a member of the United Nations, until the Security Council has taken the measures necessary to maintain international peace and security. Measures taken by members in exercise of this right of self-defence shall be immediately reported to the Security Council and shall not in any way affect the authority and responsibility of the Security Council under the present Charter to take at any time such action as it deems necessary in order to maintain or restore international peace and security.

— Chapter VII, Article 51 of the UN Charter

Any legal exercise of the right to collective self-defence must meet two conditions: the state to be assisted must make a legitimate request for aid, and must have suffered an armed attack. No formal treaty need exist between the requesting state and the assisting state. The term "armed attack" refers to a "qualitatively grave use of force"; only a use of force of sufficient gravity can qualify as an armed attack. While the requesting state must have been subject to an armed attack for any exercise of collective self-defence to be legal, the assisting state need not have come under attack. As confirmed in Nicaragua v. United States, any exercise of collective self-defence must be both necessary – i.e. a last resort – and proportionate.

== History ==
While collective self-defence as a concept existed prior to the UN Charter's drafting in 1945, the term itself was a new creation. It was incorporated into the UN Charter to assuage Latin American countries, which were concerned that a permanent member of the United Nations Security Council could use its veto power to invalidate the Act of Chapultepec, a regional collective security arrangement.
