= Director of Intelligence =

Director of Intelligence may refer to:

- head of the Directorate of Intelligence (United Kingdom)
- Director of Military Intelligence (Ireland)
- Director of the Central Intelligence Agency
- Director of National Intelligence
