= José Sette Câmara Filho =

Brazilian jurist and diplomat

José Sette Camara Filho
- Born: April 14, 1920; Alfenas, Minas Gerais
- Died: August 30, 2002 (aged 82); Rio de Janeiro
- Occupations: lawyer, diplomat, politician

José Sette Câmara Filho (14 April 1920, Alfenas – 30 August 2002, Rio de Janeiro) was a Brazilian lawyer, diplomat, and politician. He served as Judge of the International Court of Justice 1979 to 1988. From 1982 to 1985, he was Vice President of the Court.

Câmara Filho graduated from the Faculty of Law of the Federal University of Minas Gerais in 1945 and pursued graduate studies at the University of McGill. He was Permanent Representative of Brazil to the United Nations in both Geneva and New York. He also served as member of the International Law Commission.

== Works ==
- Pollution of International Rivers in Collected Courses of the Hague Academy of International Law (The Hague 1985)
- Methods of Obligatory Settlement of Disputes. in: Mohammed Bedjaoui: International Law: Achievements and Prospects. (Boston 1991)
