= José María Ruda =

Argentine jurist

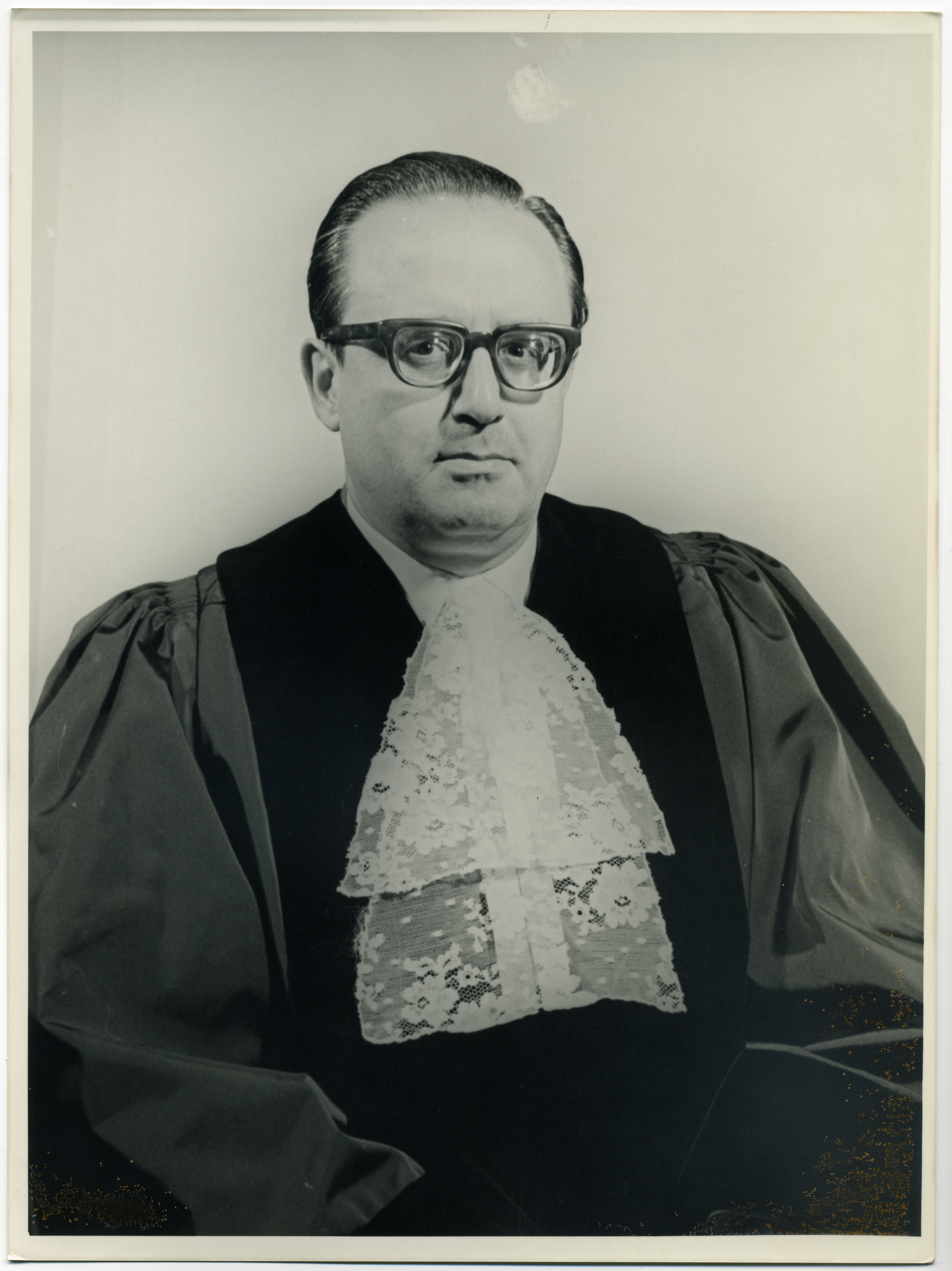

President of the International Court of Justice
- In office 1988–1991
- Preceded by: Nagendra Singh
- Succeeded by: Robert Jennings

Judge of the International Court of Justice
- In office 1973–1991

Personal details
- Born: 8 September 1924 Buenos Aires, Argentina
- Died: 7 July 1994 (aged 69) Spain
- Education: University of Buenos Aires; New York University

José María Ruda (8 September 1924 – 7 July 1994) was an Argentine jurist and is most well-known for the 1964 Ruda Statement, an 8,000 word speech to the UN Special Committee on Decolonization. It primarily argued that the Falkland Islands (Islas Malvinas) were an integral part of Argentina and that Great Britain's occupation was a colonial issue requiring bilateral negotiation.

Between 1964 and 1972 he held a seat on the United Nations International Law Commission. He also served as the Argentine ambassador to the United Nations between 1966 and 1970. He then served as a judge on International Court of Justice ("World Court") from 1973 to 1991. During this period he served as the president of the International Court of Justice between 1988 and 1991.

== Biography ==
He was born in Buenos Aires in 1924 and graduated from the University of Buenos Aires Faculty of Law in 1949. He obtained a Master of Laws in 1955 from New York University.

== Publications (selection) ==
- 1976: Instrumentos internacionales, Tipográfica Editora Argentina, Buenos Aires
- 1990: Presente y futuro del Tribunal Internacional de Justicia, Universidad de Granada.
- 1994: Derecho internacional público, Tipográfica Editora Argentina, Buenos Aires.
