= Psychological Operations in Guerrilla Warfare =

CIA manual written for the Contras

- Author: John Kirkpatrick
- Translator: Edgar Chamorro
- Language: English
- Subject: How "Armed Propaganda Teams" could build political support in Nicaragua for the Contra cause through deceit, intimidation, and violence
- Publication date: Late 1983
- Publication place: United States
- Pages: 90

Psychological Operations in Guerrilla Warfare (Operaciones sicológicas en guerra de guerrillas) was a manual written by the Central Intelligence Agency (CIA) for the Nicaraguan Contras, who were involved in a civil war with the Nicaraguan government. It was revealed by the Associated Press on October 15, 1984. The ninety-page book of instructions focused mainly on how "Armed Propaganda Teams" could build political support in Nicaragua for the Contra cause through deceit, intimidation, and violence. The manual also discussed assassinations. The International Court of Justice case Nicaragua v. United States found that the publication of this manual had "encouraged acts ... contrary to general principles of humanitarian law." However, the CIA claimed that the purpose of the manual was to "moderate" the extreme violence already being used by the Contras.

== Authorship ==
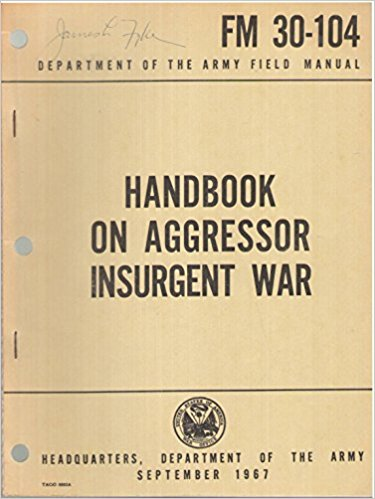
Cover of the US Army's Handbook on Aggressor Insurgent War (1967)

The manual was written in October 1983 by a CIA contract employee who used the alias John Kirkpatrick, who "was a U.S. Army counterinsurgency specialist, with experience in the Vietnam War-era Phoenix Program, working under contract to the CIA's International Activities Division." Duane Clarridge, who oversaw the writing of the manual, claimed in his 2009 book that John Kirkpatrick was brought in to prepare a course for the Contras on how to interact with the civilian population and outline the rule of engagement, and that he also produced a manual consisting of this curriculum material. Kirkpatrick based his work off of existing US Army manuals, particularly 1968 Green Beret lesson plans used at the John F. Kennedy Special Warfare Center and School, the Green Berets' Lesson Plan 643, Armed Psyop: Implicit and Explicit Terror (April 1968), and US Department of the Army (September 1967). Field Manual 30–104: Handbook on Aggressor Insurgent War. US Government Printing Office. Collaborators on developing the manual included CIA Contra coordinator Ray Doty, Nicaraguan Democratic Force director of communications Edgar Chamorro, Noel Ortiz, and Laura Ortiz.

== Publication history ==
The manual was written in English, and then translated into Spanish by Edgar Chamorro. It was printed in ninety pages under the pseudonym Tayacán in late 1983. Chamorro objected to two portions in the document, namely the sections on hiring professional criminals for special jobs and killing colleagues to create martyrs for the cause. He arranged for these two pages to be physically torn out from 2000 copies. However, 5000 copies were printed, so some commentators have reasoned that some copies were distributed with these sections intact.

== Political reaction ==
An official of President Ronald Reagan privately explained that the manual had been written by an "overzealous" independent low-level employee under contract to the CIA. Further, the manual had not been cleared for publication, was "clearly against the law", and that it violated Reagan's 1981 Executive Order banning political assassinations. On October 18, 1984, Reagan ordered CIA Director William Casey to initiate an investigation by the agency's Inspector General. "Whoever is guilty [of preparing the manual]," Reagan said, "we will deal with that situation and they will be removed."

In a news conference on November 7, a day after being reelected, Reagan dismissed the entire controversy as "much ado about nothing". Shortly thereafter, a White House spokesman said Reagan had approved the Inspector General's report recommending discipline of several mid-level officials. Five mid-level CIA employees received punishments ranging from written reprimands to suspension without pay for "poor judgment and lapses in oversight" because of the manual. In 1987, it was found that Casey blocked any punishment of the two senior CIA officials involved with producing and distributing the manual, including one, Duane Clarridge, who after initially denying that he had anything to do with the manual, admitted he was "fully responsible" for the document. In closed testimony to a congressional committee, Casey reportedly declared, "There's no reason to discipline them for one little slip-up." Under political pressure to remove Clarridge from his role, he was promoted to chief of the CIA's European operations.

== Contents ==
The manual recommended "selective use of violence for propagandistic effects" and to "neutralize" (i.e., kill) government officials. Nicaraguan Contras were taught to:

[lead] demonstrators into clashes with the authorities, to provoke riots or shootings, which lead to the killing of one or more persons, who will be seen as the martyrs; this situation should be taken advantage of immediately against the Government to create even bigger conflicts.

The manual also recommended:

selective use of armed force for PSYOP [psychological operations] effect. ... Carefully selected, planned targets — judges, police officials, tax collectors, etc. — may be removed for PSYOP effect in a UWOA [unconventional warfare operations area], but extensive precautions must ensure that the people "concur" in such an act by thorough explanatory canvassing among the affected populace before and after conduct of the mission.

Full text at Wikisource.

== Nicaragua v. United States ==
The manual was one of the issues the International Court of Justice (ICJ) analyzed in the Nicaragua v. United States 1986 ICJ 1 case. The court's jurisdiction for this case was disputed by the United States when it was first brought in 1984, a claim which the ICJ rejected months later, leading the United States to withdraw from the case in protest in 1985. The court eventually ruled in Nicaragua's favor in 1986.

The ICJ statements included: "Finds that the United States of America, by producing in 1983 a manual entitled Operaciones sicológicas en guerra de guerrillas, and disseminating it to contra forces, has encouraged the commission by them of acts contrary to general principles of humanitarian law; but does not find a basis for concluding that any such acts which may have been committed are imputable to the United States of America as acts of the United States of America."

"The Court has to determine whether the relationship of the contras to the United States Government was such that it would be right to equate the contras, for legal purposes, with an organ of the United States Government, or as acting on behalf of that Government. The Court considers that the evidence available to it is insufficient to demonstrate the total dependence of the contras on United States aid. A partial dependency, the exact extent of which the Court cannot establish, may be inferred from the fact that the leaders were selected by the United States, and from other factors such as the organisation, training and equipping of the force, planning of operations, the choosing of targets and the operational support provided. There is no clear evidence that the United States actually exercised such a degree of control as to justify treating the contras as acting on its behalf."

"Having reached the above conclusion, the Court takes the view that the contras remain responsible for their acts, in particular the alleged violations by them of humanitarian law. For the United States to be legally responsible, it would have to be proved that that State had effective control of the operations in the course of which the alleged violations were committed."

== See also ==
- The Freedom Fighter's Manual
- U.S. Army and CIA interrogation manuals
- U.S. Army Field Manual 30-31B
- United States involvement in regime change

== Bibliography ==
- Tayacán (1983). Psychological Operations in Guerrilla Warfare . Central Intelligence Agency..
- Clarridge, Duane R.; Diehl, Digby (2009). A Spy For All Seasons: My Life in the CIA. Scribner. ISBN 978-1-4391-8847-7.
- LeoGrande, W.M. (2009). Our Own Backyard: The United States in Central America, 1977-1992. University of North Carolina Press. ISBN 978-0-8078-9880-2.
- Sklar, H. (1988). Washington's War on Nicaragua. Latina/O and Latin American Studies. South End Press. ISBN 978-0-89608-295-3.
- "Cold War Episode 18: Backyard". CNN. Archived from the original on February 10, 2006.
- "The CIA's murder manual" (PDF). Washington Post. 21 October 1984. p. C6. (HTML transcription)
- Case Concerning Military and Paramilitary Activities in and Against Nicaragua (Nicaragua v. United States of America). The Hague: International Court of Justice. 2000. ISBN 9210708261. Archived from the original on 2009-01-22. "[The] manual, several thousand which were produced, was distributed ordering political assassinations, hiring of criminals and other forms of terrorism. Some of it was excised; but the part dealing with political terrorism was continued. (p. 178)"
- Leogrande, William M. (1 February 2000). "Peace Offensive". Our Own Backyard: The United States in Central America, 1977–1992. University of North Carolina Press. p. 363. ISBN 0-8078-4857-3.
- Lisa Haugaard. "Military Training Manuals, Latin America Working Group". Archived from the original on June 13, 2006.
- Emanuel Pietrobon; Elham Makdoum (2025). Operazioni psicologiche nella guerra di guerriglia. MasiraX.
