= List of wars involving Cuba =

This is a list of wars involving the Republic of Cuba and predecessor states.

Cuban defeat
Cuban victory
Another result (e.g. a treaty or peace without a clear result, status quo ante bellum, result of civil or internal conflict, result unknown or indecisive)

== List ==
- Anglo-Spanish War (1585–1604): Battle of Pinos (1596), Raid on Santiago de Cuba (1603)
- Eighty Years' War, 1621–1648 (Eighty Years' War and Thirty Years' War): Battle in the Bay of Matanzas (1628)
- Invasion of Cuba (1741) – 1741 – War of Jenkins' Ear (War of the Austrian Succession)
- Battle of Santiago de Cuba (1748) – 1748 – War of Jenkins' Ear (War of the Austrian Succession)
- Battle of Havana (1748) – 1748 – War of Jenkins' Ear (War of the Austrian Succession)
- Battle of the Windward Passage – 1760 – Seven Years' War
- Siege of Havana – 1762 – Anglo-Spanish War (1762–1763) (Seven Years' War)
- Action of 17 February 1783 – 1783 – American Revolutionary War
- Action of 23 August 1806 – 1806 – Anglo-Spanish War (1796–1808) (French Revolutionary and Napoleonic Wars)
- Spanish–American War: Battle of San Juan Hill (1898), battle of Santiago de Cuba (1898)

Conflict	Combatant 1	Combatant 2	Result	President	Prime Minister
Lopez Expedition (1850-1851)	Filibusters	Captaincy General of Cuba	Spanish Cuba victory: Filibuster leaders executed	None	None
Ten Years' War (1868–1878)	Republic of Cuba in Arms; Cuban Liberation Army; Supported by: American, Puerto Rican, Dominican and Mexican volunteers	Spanish Empire: Captaincy General of Cuba	Pact of Zanjón	None	None
Little War (Cuba) (1879–1880)	Cuban Rebels	Spain	Spanish victory		None
Cuban War of Independence (1895–1898)	Republic of Cuba in Arms: Mambises; Cuban Liberation Army	Spanish Empire: Captaincy General of Cuba	American intervention; independence granted in 1902: Treaty of Paris; United States governance of Cuba; Cuban independence		None
Cuban Pacification (1906)	(Cuba) Conservatives	(Cuba) Liberals	Liberal victory: Subsequent US occupation of Cuba	Tomás Estrada Palma	None
War of 1912 (1912)	Cuba; United States	(Cuba) Cuban Partido Independiente de Color	Rebellion suppressed: Dissolution of the Partido Independiente de Color (PIC)	José Miguel Gómez	None
Chambelona War (1917)	Cuba; United States	Liberal Party of Cuba	Rebellion suppressed	Mario García Menocal	None
Sugar Intervention (1917–1922)	(Cuba) Conservatives; United States	(Cuba) Liberals	Conservative victory: Uprising quelled, US occupation of Cuba	Mario García Menocal	None
World War I (1917–1918)	Allied Powers: France; United Kingdom; and Empire: Australia; Canada; Ceylon; Egypt; Newfoundland; New Zealand; India; South Africa; Russia (until 1917) (Note: The Russian Empire during 1914–1917, the Russian Republic during 1917. The Bolsheviks signed an armistice followed by a separate peace shortly after their armed seizure of power.); Italy (from 1915); United States (from 1917); Japan; Cuba; and others ...	Central Powers: Germany; Austria-Hungary; Ottoman Empire; Bulgaria (from 1915); and others ...	Allied Powers victory (see Aftermath of World War I): Partition of the Ottoman Empire, dissolution of Austria-Hungary, transfer of German colonies and territories to other countries; Formation of new countries in Europe and the Middle East, such as Poland, Yugoslavia, Weimar Germany, Soviet Russia and Soviet Union, Lithuania, Estonia, Latvia, Austria, Hungary, Czechoslovakia, Turkey, Hejaz, and Yemen	Mario García Menocal	None
Sugar Intervention (1917–1922)	(Cuba) Conservatives; United States	(Cuba) Liberals	Conservative victory: Uprising quelled, US occupation of Cuba	Mario García Menocal	None
World War II (1941–1945)	Allies; United States; Soviet Union; United Kingdom; China; France; Poland; Canada; Australia; New Zealand; India; South Africa; Yugoslavia; Greece; Denmark; Norway; Netherlands; Belgium; Luxembourg; Czechoslovakia; Brazil; Mexico; Panama; Costa Rica; El Salvador; Guatemala; Honduras; Nicaragua; Dominican Republic; Cuba	Axis; Germany; Japan; Italy; Hungary; Romania; Bulgaria; Croatia; Slovakia; Finland; Thailand; Manchukuo; Mengjiang	Allied victory (see Aftermath of World War II): Collapse of the German Reich; Fall of Japanese and Italian Empires; Creation of the United Nations; Emergence of the United States and the Soviet Union as superpowers; Beginning of the Cold War	Fulgencio Batista	Carlos Saladrigas Zayas
American theater of World War II (1941–1945)	Allies: United States (from 1941); Canada; United Kingdom: Newfoundland; Free France; Netherlands; Panama (from 1941); Costa Rica (from 1941); Dominican Republic (from 1941); El Salvador (from 1941); Haiti (from 1941); Honduras (from 1941); Nicaragua (from 1941); Cuba (from 1941); Guatemala (from 1941); Mexico (from 1942); Brazil (from 1942); Bolivia (from 1943); Colombia (from 1943); Ecuador (from 1945); Paraguay (from 1945); Peru (from 1945); Uruguay (from 1945); Venezuela (from 1945); Argentina (from 1945); Chile (from 1945)	Axis: Germany; Italy; Japan (from 1941) Vichy France	Allied victory: Axis objectives failed or did not affect the outcome of the conflict.	Fulgencio Batista	Carlos Saladrigas Zayas
Cuban Revolution (1953–1959)	Cuba: Cuban Constitutional Army	26th of July Movement; Revolutionary Directorate of March 13th; Second National Front of Escambray	Revolutionary victory: Overthrow of Fulgencio Batista's government; Establishment of a government led by Fidel Castro; Beginning of the Escambray rebellion	Fulgencio Batista	Andrés Domingo
Escambray rebellion (1959–1965)	Government of Cuba; Soviet Union	Insurgents: Anti-communists; Batistianos; United States	Cuban government victory	Osvaldo Dorticós Torrado	Fidel Castro
Cuban invasion of Panama (1959)	Cuba (Panama) Revolutionary Action Movement (Panama) May 22nd Youth Revolutionary Movement	Panama; United States; Guatemala	Cuban expedition failed	Osvaldo Dorticós Torrado	Fidel Castro
Invasion of the Dominican Republic (1959)	Cuba	Dominican Republic	Cuban invasion failed	Osvaldo Dorticós Torrado	Fidel Castro
Bay of Pigs Invasion (1961)	Cuba	United States; Cuban DRF	Cuban government victory: US–Opposition failure to topple the Cuban government; All surviving counter revolutionaries captured; Increased cooperation between Cuba and the Soviet Union	Osvaldo Dorticós Torrado	Fidel Castro
Sand War (1963–1964)	Algeria; Support: Egypt; Cuba	Morocco; Support: France	Military stalemate: The closing of the border south of Figuig, Morocco/Béni Ounif, Algeria.; Morocco abandoned its attempts to control Béchar and Tindouf after OAU mediation.; Demilitarized zone established; No territorial changes	Osvaldo Dorticós Torrado	Fidel Castro
Congo Crisis (1963-1965)	1963–1965: Kwilu and Simba rebels; Supported by: Soviet Union; China; Cuba	1963–1965: Democratic Republic of the Congo; United States; Belgium; Malaysia; Supported by: (United Nations) ONUC (1964)	Defeat: The Congo established as an independent unitary state under the authoritarian presidency of Mobutu Sese Seko.	Osvaldo Dorticós Torrado	Fidel Castro
Guinea-Bissau War of Independence (1963–1974)	PAIGC; Supported by: Soviet Union; China; Cuba; North Korea; Algeria; Guinea; Senegal	Portugal	Algiers Accord: Independence of Guinea-Bissau and Cape Verde from Portugal	Osvaldo Dorticós Torrado	Fidel Castro
South African Border War (1966–1990)	SWAPO (PLAN); MPLA (FAPLA); Cuba; SWANU; ANC (MK); Zambia; Military advisers and pilots: Soviet Union; East Germany	South Africa: TGNU (1985–1989); Portugal (until 1974); UNITA (from 1975); FNLA (1975)	Military stalemate: Angolan Tripartite Accord, leading to: Withdrawal of South African forces from Namibia; withdrawal of Cuban forces from Angola; 1989 Namibian parliamentary elections; SWAPO government assuming power in Namibia; South West Africa gains independence from South Africa as the Republic of Namibia	Osvaldo Dorticós Torrado	Fidel Castro
Ñancahuazú Guerrilla (1966–1967)	ELN; Cuba	Bolivia; United States; Supported by: Brazil	Bolivian government victory: Che Guevara executed	Osvaldo Dorticós Torrado	Fidel Castro
Machurucuto raid (1967)	Revolutionary Left Movement; Cuban guerrillas Supported by: Cuba	Venezuelan National Guard; Venezuelan Army	Venezuelan government victory	Osvaldo Dorticós Torrado	Fidel Castro
War of Attrition (1967-1970)	Egypt; Soviet Union; Kuwait; PLO; Jordan; Syria; Cuba	Israel	Inconclusive: See aftermath	Osvaldo Dorticós Torrado	Fidel Castro
Yom Kippur War (1973)	Egypt; Syria; Expeditionary forces Saudi Arabia Algeria Jordan Libya Iraq Kuwait Tunisia Morocco Cuba North Korea	Israel	Defeat: See § Aftermath; At the final ceasefire: Egyptian forces held 1,200 km^{2} (460 sq mi) on the eastern bank of the canal.; Israeli forces held 1,600 km^{2} (620 sq mi) on the western bank of the canal.; Israeli forces held 500 km^{2} (193 sq mi) of the Syrian Bashan region of the Golan Heights.	Osvaldo Dorticós Torrado	Fidel Castro
Operation Independence (1975-1977)	ERP; Montoneros Supported by: Cuba	Argentina; Supported by: United States; Bolivia; Brazil; Chile; Paraguay; Uruguay	Argentine government victory	None	Fidel Castro
Cuban intervention in Angola (1975–1991)	Cuba; MPLA; Soviet Union; SWAPO	UNITA; FNLA (until 1978); South Africa; FLEC	Stalemate: Cuban and South African withdrawal in 1991	Fidel Castro	Fidel Castro
Cabinda War (1975–1991)	Angola; Cuba (until 1991); RPD Angola (1991); UNITA (joint operations, 1991); Military advisers and pilots: East Germany (until 1989); Soviet Union (until 1989)	FLEC; FLEC-FAC; CCC; Republic of Cabinda (1975–1976, 1999); Democratic Front of Cabinda; Zaire (1975)	Cuban withdrawal: War is Ongoing	Fidel Castro	Fidel Castro
Angolan Civil War (1975–1989)	People's Republic of Angola/Republic of Angola: MPLA; Cuba (1975–1989); SWAPO (1975–1989); ANC (1975–1989); FLNC (1975–1978) Military advisers and pilots: Soviet Union (1975–1989); East Germany (1975–1989); North Korea (1980s) (Note: The North Korean Military Mission in Angola had about 1,500 personnel attached to FAPLA in 1986, most likely advisers, although their exact duties are uncertain. Their presence in Angola may have been indirectly subsidised by the Soviet Union. Up to 3,000 North Korean military personnel served in Angola throughout the 1980s.)	Democratic People's Republic of Angola: UNITA; FNLA (1975–1983); South Africa (1975–1989); Zaire (1975–1978); FLEC Military advisers: United States (1975–1989)	MPLA victory: Withdrawal of all foreign forces in 1989.; Resistance of FLEC continued to this day	Fidel Castro	Fidel Castro
Ogaden War (1977–1978)	Ethiopia; Cuba; Soviet Union; South Yemen	Somalia; WSLF	Victory: Soviet and Cuban intervention leads to Somali withdrawal; Somalia breaks all ties with the Soviet Bloc and the Second World (except China and Romania).; Beginning of the Somali Rebellion	Fidel Castro	Fidel Castro
Eritrean War of Independence (1977–1991)	1974; Ethiopian Empire 1974–1991; Derg (1974–1987); PDR Ethiopia (1987–1991) Military advisers: Soviet Union (1974–1990); Cuba (1974–1990); Israel (1990–1991)	ELF (until 1981) EPLF (since 1973) (Tigray Region) TPLF (since 1975)	EPLF victory: ELF defeated by EPLF during the Eritrean Civil Wars; EPLF overthrew the Derg regime; Eritrea gains de facto independence from Ethiopia in 1991 under EPLF rule, and de jure independence after the referendum held in 1993 under UN auspices; Independence of Eritrea; Ethiopia becomes a landlocked country.	Fidel Castro	
Ethiopian Civil War (1977–1991)	Derg (1974–1987); PDR Ethiopia (1987–1991) Military advisers: Soviet Union (1974–1990); Cuba (1974–1990); Israel (1990–1991)	(Tigray Region) TPLF; EPLF (Amhara Region) EPDM; EPRP; MEISON; EDU; OLF; WSLF; ONLF; ALF; IFLO	EPLF/TPLF rebel victory: Fall of the Ethiopian Empire and subsequent implementation of military rule; Creation, then collapse, of the People's Democratic Republic of Ethiopia by the Derg; Installation of the TPLF-led transitional government which would later become the EPRDF government in Ethiopia; Installation of the EPLF-established PFDJ government in Eritrea after independence from Ethiopia; Independence of Eritrea; Ethiopia becomes a landlocked country.	Fidel Castro	
Nicaraguan Revolution (1961-1990)	Sandinista National Liberation Front: Junta of National Reconstruction/Nicaraguan Government (from 1979); Sandinista Popular Army; MAP-ML (1978–1979); MILPAS; Panama (1978–1979, under Omar Torrijos) Supported by: Cuba: Dirección de Inteligencia; Soviet Union Other supporters: East Germany (until 1989); Yugoslavia; Hungary (until 1989); Libya; North Korea; Bulgaria; Czechoslovakia (until 1989); Palestine Liberation Organization; Poland (until 1989); Algeria; France; Costa Rica (1978–1982); Sweden (medical support); Canada (1984–1990, developmental aid); Venezuela (1978–1979); Chile (1970-1973)	(Nicaragua) Somoza regime (1961–1979): National Guard; Contras (1981–1990): FDN; UDN; ARDE; MILPAS; Fifteenth of September Legion; KISAN/YATAMA; Supported by: United States: CIA; Honduras (from 1981) Other supporters: El Salvador; Guatemala (from 1983); Costa Rica (1982–1986); Panama (1981–1987, under Manuel Noriega); Chile (from 1973); Argentina (1976–1983); Israel; Saudi Arabia; Imperial State of Iran (until 1979); Islamic Republic of Iran (from 1979, indirectly); People's Republic of China (allegedly); Poland (allegedly); Romania; Taiwan; Colombia; Brazil; Portugal; Brunei	Inconclusive: Anastasio Somoza Debayle resigns and flees to the United States in July 1979, relinquishing control of the government.; A five-member provisional government takes its place.; The right-wing Contras begin an armed insurgency against the Sandinistas in 1981 which continues until 1990.; The Tela Accord is signed in 1989 and the Sandinista party is defeated in the 1990 election, bringing the armed revolution to an end.; Sandinistas led by Daniel Ortega are re-elected in 2006 and remain in power until today.	Fidel Castro	
United States invasion of Grenada (1983)	Grenada (PRG); People's Revolutionary Army	United States; Grenadian Opposition: Caribbean Peace Force: Barbados; Jamaica; Organisation of Eastern Caribbean States; Antigua and Barbuda; Dominica; Saint Kitts and Nevis; Saint Lucia; Saint Vincent and the Grenadines	American–CPF & Grenadian Opposition victory: Grenadian People's Revolutionary Government toppled; Hudson Austin deposed; Nicholas Brathwaite sworn into office; Cuban and Soviet forces expelled		None
2026 United States intervention in Venezuela (2026)	Venezuela; Cuba	United States; United States Armed Forces; United States Army; 160th Special Operations Aviation Regiment; Delta Force; United States Navy; United States Marine Corps; United States Coast Guard; United States Air Force; United States Cyber Command; United States Space Command; Central Intelligence Agency; United States Department of Justice; Drug Enforcement Administration; Federal Bureau of Investigation; Hostage Rescue Team	Defeat: Nicolás Maduro and Cilia Flores captured by the US military and prosecuted; Vice president Delcy Rodríguez sworn in as acting president of Venezuela; Amnesty bill and 621 political prisoners detained in Venezuela released (as of 8 March); 2026 Cuban crisis; Lift of US sanctions on oil trade and privatization of Venezuela oil industry	Miguel Díaz-Canel	Manuel Marrero Cruz

== Bibliography ==
- Brown, Jonathan (2017). "The bandido counterrevolution in Cuba, 1959–1965". Nuevo Mundo Mundos Nuevos. doi:10.4000/nuevomundo.71412.
- Clodfelter, Micheal (2017). Warfare and Armed Conflicts: A Statistical Encyclopedia of Casualty and Other Figures, 1492–2015, 4th ed. McFarland. ISBN 978-0-786-47470-7.
- Dinges, John (1990). Our Man in Panama. Random House. ISBN 978-0-8129-1950-9.
- Gleijeses, Piero (2002). Conflicting Missions: Havana, Washington and Africa, 1959–1976. Chapel Hill, NC: University of North Carolina Press. ISBN 978-0-807-82647-8.
- Latell, Brian (24 April 2012). Castro's Secrets: Cuban Intelligence, The CIA, and the Assassination of John F. Kennedy. St. Martin's Press. ISBN 978-1-137-00001-9.
- Morris, Benny (2001). Righteous Victims: A History of the Zionist-Arab Conflict, 1881-2001. New York: Vintage Books. ISBN 978-0-679-42120-7.
- O'Ballance, Edgar (1978). No Victor, No Vanquished: The Yom Kippur War. Presidio Press. ISBN 978-0-89141-017-1.
- Ottaway, David (1970), Algeria: The Politics of a Socialist Revolution, Berkeley, California: University of California Press, ISBN 978-0-520-01655-2
- Rabinovich, Abraham (2004). The Yom Kippur War: The Epic Encounter That Transformed the Middle East. New York: Schocken Books. ISBN 978-0-8052-4176-1.
- Shazly, Lieutenant General Saad el (2003). The Crossing of the Suez, Revised Edition (revised ed.). American Mideast Research. ISBN 978-0-9604562-2-2.

== See also ==
- Military interventions of Cuba
