= Édgar Chamorro =

Nicaraguan Contra (born 1931)

Édgar Chamorro Coronel (born 23 July 1931) is a Nicaraguan former politician and military officer. He was a leader of the Contras but later became a critic of the rebels and their Central Intelligence Agency sponsors, even cooperating with the Sandinista government in their World Court case, Nicaragua v. United States. He is a member of the prominent Chamorro family that provided five of Nicaragua's past presidents.

== Early life ==
Édgar Chamorro is the son of Julio Chamorro Benard and Dolores "Lola" Coronel Urtecho, the paternal grandson of Filadelfo Chamorro Bolaños and Bertha Benard Vivas and great-grandson of Pedro Joaquín Chamorro y Alfaro, 39th President of Nicaragua, and María de la Luz Bolaños Bendaña. He has six brothers and four sisters, and is the nephew of intellectual José Coronel Urtecho. In 1950, 19-year-old Chamorro began studying for the Jesuit priesthood, earning degrees from Ecuador's Catholic University (B.A., magna cum laude), Saint Louis University (M.Th., summa cum laude), and Marquette University (M.Ed.). Chamorro joined the faculty of the Jesuit-run University of Central America, eventually becoming a full professor and Dean of the School of Humanities before leaving the priesthood in 1969. He received a masters degree in education from Harvard University in 1972, and later joined a public relations and marketing firm, Creative Publicity, in Managua. In 1977, Anastasio Somoza Debayle appointed him to a figurehead post as a special ambassador to the United Nations General Assembly for a year.

== Activities during Nicaraguan civil war ==
During the Sandinista Revolution, Chamorro sympathized with the rebels, at one point hiding Sergio Ramírez from the National Guard. But as the civil war's climax brought fierce fighting to the capital itself, fears for his family's safety led him to leave for Miami, Florida on 17 June 1979. Somoza fell a month later, but after visiting Nicaragua in September, Chamorro decided to remain in Miami.

By late 1979, Chamorro had become involved in the anti-Sandinista activities of the Miami exile community. He joined the Nicaraguan Democratic Union (UDN), formed the next year by José Francisco Cardenal, which merged into the Nicaraguan Democratic Force (FDN) in August 1981. He served on the FDN's political executive committee, which decided to replace Cardenal with a new political directorate. Chamorro was tapped to be a member of the directorate, unveiled at a 8 December 1982 press conference. With his public relations experience, he took on a spokesman role for the FDN, and based himself in Tegucigalpa, Honduras to liaison with journalists covering the war. Chamorro claimed that the CIA prepped him before press conferences and told him to deny that the group had received any funding from the US government.

Chamorro was miffed when the FDN directorate, at the CIA's prompting, appointed Adolfo Calero as its president in October 1983. His not-so-private grumblings that his Chamorro lineage was more illustrious than Calero's did not help their deteriorating relations. Chamorro was forced out in November 1984, in the fallout from the furor over the CIA's Psychological Operations in Guerrilla Warfare, labeled by the press a "murder manual." He turned against the rebel movement, even submitting an affidavit for the Sandinista government before the International Court of Justice in Nicaragua v. United States.

== After the war ==
Chamorro is author of Packaging the Contras: A Case of C.I.A. Disinformation (1987). He has served as a teacher of Spanish, Latin and Latin American Studies at Bard College at Simon's Rock since 1990 (full-time to 2003), and the John Dewey Academy in Great Barrington, Massachusetts since 2005.
