= Joseph F. Fernandez =

CIA Station chief (1937–2020)

Joseph F. Fernandez (1937 – December 3, 2020) was an American intelligence official who was the Central Intelligence Agency station chief in Costa Rica (operating under the pseudonym Tomás Castillo) and a figure in the Iran-Contra Affair.

Fernandez, a Cuban-American, was a protégé of Duane Clarridge in the early years of the Contra operation. When Clarridge was replaced by Alan Fiers as the CIA's Central American point man, Fernandez allied himself with the National Security Council's Oliver North rather than Fiers. North and Fernandez sought to revive the anti-Sandinista cause in the south, blaming Edén Pastora's erratic leadership for the Democratic Revolutionary Alliance's moribund state. In early 1986, Fernandez convinced Pastora's field commanders to join Fernando "El Negro" Chamorro, who had allied with the northern-based Nicaraguan Democratic Force. However, his efforts with North to build a strong Contra Southern Front, including aerial resupply of rebel forces in the south by Richard Secord's "Enterprise," enmeshed him in the Iran-Contra Affair.

Fernandez was originally indicted June 20, 1988 on four counts of obstruction and false statements. The indictment of Fernandez represented the first time that a CIA chief of station had been charged with crimes committed in the course of his duties as a CIA officer. Following a venue change, a new indictment was made April 24, 1989. The case was dismissed November 24, 1989 when Attorney General Richard L. Thornburgh refused to declassify information needed for his defense.

After charges were dropped, he founded Guardian Technologies International with Oliver North.

Fernandez died on December 3, 2020.

== Sources ==
- Lawrence E. Walsh (August 4, 1993) Chapter 20: United States v. Joseph F. Fernandez. Final Report of the Independent Counsel for Iran/Contra Matters.
