= José Francisco Cardenal =

Nicaraguan businessman

José Francisco Cardenal (born 1940) was a Nicaraguan businessman who became known as one of the most pugnacious opponents of the Somoza and then the Sandinista regimes of Nicaragua, and played an important role in the early days of the Contra rebellion.

In 1980 he fled Nicaragua for Miami where he began to organize the 15th of September Legion to oppose the Somoza regime. On August 11, 1981, his Nicaraguan Democratic Union (UDN) merged with September 15 Legion to form the Nicaraguan Democratic Force (FDN). A political triumvirate was formed, consisting of Cardenal and Mariano Mendoza from the UDN, and Aristides Sánchez from the Legion.

However, the strong-willed Cardenal alienated his compatriots. His dealings with his Argentine patrons, intended to show that this was a Nicaraguan struggle to which they were only advisors, they found insulting and ungrateful. His assertions of civilian primacy over the military seemed to the high command to be interference in matters in which he was unqualified. He also had contempt for the FDN's political executive committee in Miami, regarding them as a clique of corrupt, bickering petty politicians, who it turn began seeing him as a would-be caudillo. When he declared them disbanded, they in turn dismissed him.

Cardenal still enjoyed good relations with the CIA, and they agreed to fund an effort However, the Agency severed funding after he publicly mentioned his plans to create an Internal Front in an interview. His network had been penetrated by Sandinista intelligence from its inception, and they now rolled it up. After this, Cardenal gave up on rebel politics and began selling life insurance in Miami. However, he did not turn on the movement, and when Congress approved $100 million in aid to the Contras in 1986, he appeared at a press conference with the UNO (United Nicaraguan Opposition) leaders to join in the celebrations.
