= Aristides Sánchez =

Nicaraguan contra

José Aristides Sánchez Herdocia served as a key political figure among the Nicaraguan Contras. Early on, he joined Enrique Bermúdez in efforts to start a rebel opposition to the new Sandinista government, a hand-picked choice of the CIA for this position. As the conduit between political leader Adolfo Calero in Miami and rebel base camps in Honduras, he spent more time in the camps than other Contra politicians and had the trust of the rebel field commanders. After working largely behind the scenes, in 1987 he joined the directorate of the Nicaraguan Resistance.

Sánchez's Contra career embodied striking contrasts. He was the key ally of the Contra leaders most favored by the CIA and on the agency's payroll, yet he himself was detested by the CIA. Unlike many Contra political leaders, chosen for their ability to woo American Congressmen, he did not speak English. He has been characterized as a Somocista oligarch, but also as an anti-American nationalist.

Sánchez came from a family that had been prominent in Nicaragua's Liberal Party early in the 20th century. Exiled by the 1979 Sandinista Revolution, he joined Enrique Bermúdez in recruiting for the 15th of September Legion.

When the 15th of September Legion merged with the Nicaraguan Democratic Union in August 1981 to form the Nicaraguan Democratic Force, he joined the FDN's political triumvirate along with the UDN's José Francisco Cardenal and Mariano Mendoza. But when the FDN replaced the triumvirate with a directorate in late 1982, the CIA's hostility forced Sánchez to recede into background roles.

Sánchez became the key link between the political and military leadership of the FDN. He served as Calero's political enforcer in Honduras, while Bermúdez counted on him to be the military's advocate in the political councils of Miami. The tight alliance between the three men became known as the "iron triangle," but privately Sánchez felt he came from a more prominent family than Calero and resented serving under him.

In May 1987, he and Calero were elected to the directorate of the new rebel umbrella group, the Nicaraguan Resistance. Now on a more equal footing with Calero, he became a rival for power. As the "iron triangle" collapsed, he opposed Calero's effort to remove Bermúdez in 1988.

On November 15, 1990, the day after a clash between police and former rebels at the Sébaco bridge, he was arrested. He filed a complaint with the Inter-American Commission on Human Rights, charging that he had been coerced by torture and the withholding of medicine into signing false statements.

Sánchez died on September 6, 1993, at age 50, after battling cancer for two years. His widow, Cecilia, has continued to support the cause of demobilized resistance fighters.
