= Nicaraguan Democratic Union =

The Nicaraguan Democratic Union (UDN, Unión Democrática Nicaragüense) was founded in late 1980 by José Francisco Cardenal, an early leader of the anti-Sandinista rebel movement that became known as the Nicaraguan Contras. The UDN was based in Miami, Florida, among its growing community of exiles from Nicaragua's middle class. It established an armed wing, the Nicaraguan Revolutionary Armed Forces (FARN, Fuerzas Armadas Revolucionarias Nicaragüenses).

The UDN attracted interest from the steadfastly anti-Sandinista Reagan Administration and also received limited funding from Argentina's military junta. However, they conditioned further aid on the UDN unifying its efforts with those of former National Guardsmen who had served the Somoza regime.

Cardenal accepted, creating a merged organization known as the Nicaraguan Democratic Force (FDN). Dissenters broke away over the issue and continued to call themselves the UDN-FARN. The FDN would grow into the dominant Contra organization, but Cardenal himself soon fell out of power after alienating his allies in the Contra movement. The breakaway UDN-FARN, under Fernando "El Negro" Chamorro, remained a small force throughout the war.

== UDN to FDN ==
An armed wing, the Nicaraguan Revolutionary Armed Forces (FARN), was created under Edmundo Chamorro. Orlando Bolaños served as chief of staff, and by February 1981, Raúl Arana was in Tegucigalpa as coordinator of combat operations. Around May 1981, Edmundo Chamorro received $50,000 from the Argentine government.

On August 11, 1981, Raúl Arana and Orlando Bolaños from the UDN met with Legion leader Enrique Bermúdez in Guatemala City, and agreed to unite in a new organization, the Nicaraguan Democratic Force. The Chamorro brothers refused to accept the merger, and split off their faction, retaining the UDN-FARN name.

A three-man political commission was established for the FDN, with Cardenal as its coordinator, his ally Mariano Mendoza from the UDN, and Aristides Sánchez from the Legion. The FDN's executive committee in Miami also included many who had been involved in the UDN.

== Chamorro's UDN-FARN ==
In April 1981, El Negro's old friend, Edén Pastora publicly made his break with the Sandinistas. The UDN-FARN became a founding member of the rebel organization that Pastora was forming in Costa Rica, the Democratic Revolutionary Alliance (ARDE), on September 23, 1981. However, Pastora and his advisers sought to initiate talks with the Sandinistas rather than immediately launching an armed struggle. By March, El Negro's impatience led him to break with Pastora and ally with the FDN.

FARN's tiny force, estimated at thirty men, participated in the FDN's Operation Marathon in late September 1983. Despite instructions not to attack the border post at El Espino, which would have risked offending Honduran authorities who denied that Nicaraguan rebels were based on their soil, they did so. The fighting crossed over the border, leading the Honduran government to expel El Negro.

Back in Costa Rica, UDN-FARN joined the new rebel umbrella group, the United Nicaraguan Opposition (UNO), in June 1985. UNO/FARN began competing for the loyalties of Pastora's ARDE remnants. In early 1986, most of Pastora's commanders agreed to align with Chamorro, and in May, Pastora quit the struggle with a handful of remaining followers. However, FDN leaders were always ambivalent about supporting UNO/South. In January 1987, the Southern Front withdrew from UNO, citing broken promises. The Southern Front was brought back on board for the Nicaraguan Resistance in May.
