= Nicaraguan Indigenous organizations =

Since the mid-twentieth century, Indigenous organizations in Nicaragua have historically formed in response to economic, political, and cultural injustices and to create infrastructure for self-governance. They often represent their motives and goals as pan-Indigenous and do not employ Marxist or Leninist ideas or language of class struggles. Although many organizations stress Miskitu ethnicity, language, and history, most major Nicaraguan Indigenous organizations have generally advocated for Indigenous peoples.

== Nicaraguan Indigenous groups ==
Indigenous organizations are composed of persons belonging to several Indigenous groups that live in Nicaragua. These include the Miskitu, the Sumu (also known as the Mayangna and the Sumo), the Ulwa, the Sutiava (also known as the Xiu), the Garifuna, the Nahoa (also known as Nicarao), the Cacaopera (also known as the Matagalpa), the Chorotega (also known as Mange), and the Rama. Most Indigenous persons either live in the North Caribbean Coast Autonomous Region (RACCN) or the South Caribbean Coast Autonomous Region (RACCS). However, almost all Indigenous groups can be found across all departments and autonomous regions of Nicaragua.

=== Chart of Indigenous Populations by Department / Autonomous Region ===
Indigenous Group	National Population	Population in RACCN	Population in RACCS	Population in Boaco	Population in Carazo	Population in Chinandega	Population in Chontales	Population in Estelí	Population in Granada	Population in Jinotega	Population in León	Population in Madriz	Population in Managua	Population in Masaya	Population in Matagalpa	Population in Nueva Segovia	Population in Río San Juan	Population in Rivas
Cacaopera	15,240	238	17	2	8	15	3	20	7	269	11	43	199	25	14,341	8	1	33
Chorotega	46,002	85	216	15	31	495	14	167	54	6,595	54	25,415	272	7,233	1,060	4,204	2	90
Garifuna	3,721	89	1,095	76	78	170	67	126	85	160	141	42	625	109	218	104	38	48
Miskitu	120,817	102,806	7,398	4	36	86	55	64	19	8,139	79	7	1,754	62	152	72	51	33
Nahoa	11,113	31	33	24	20	167	28	30	30	248	103	22	588	824	186	24	-	8,755
Rama	4,185	208	1,239	71	73	179	79	107	65	158	130	83	989	148	238	143	223	52
Sumu	9,756	6,786	89	31	29	54	33	26	28	2,201	53	17	189	68	91	33	10	18
Sutiava	19,949	16	21	-	5	132	6	19	4	29	19,347	9	228	63	40	10	3	17
Ulwa	698	49	7,398	28	22	50	21	24	42	46	48	13	146	39	51	25	10	16

== Nicaraguan Indigenous organizations ==
=== Prior to the Sandinista Revolution (1962-1978) ===
==== Association of Agricultural Clubs of the Río Coco: 1967-1972 ====
Organized in the midst of the Somoza Dynasty as a response to deflated prices for agricultural products and international reform initiatives, the Association of Agricultural Clubs of the Río Coco (ACARIC) was organized by Miskitu farmers living within communities along the Río Coco to strengthen their local economies and to structure community collaboration efforts. ACARIC originally received funding from both Nicaraguan organizations, such as the National Development Institute (INFONAC), and United States organizations, most notably United States Agency for International Development (USAID) and Catholic Relief Services (CRS). While most organizational efforts were directed at collectively setting prices to sell and buy food products from—generally—non-indigenous merchants, liberation theological methodologies were utilized by Gregorio Smutko and other Capuchin missionaries within newly developed educational curricula to develop singularity among the Miskitu.

==== Alliance for the Progress of the Miskito and Sumu: 1974-1979 ====
After the decline of the ACARIC, Miskitu Moravian ministers assembled |Alliance for the Progress of the Miskito and Sumu (ALPROMISU) as a liberation theology-based indigenous organization aimed at community capacity building, resource management, and allocating power away from Creole religious officials and to the Miskitu people while continuing to structure market prices for Miskitu and Sumu farmers. With the end of kampani taim and the subsequent loss of income, religious networks became vital to support a broken indigenous economy. Rural Moravian churches became common venues for ALPROMISU meetings; by not congregating in urban centers, assemblies remained homogeneously indigenous. Gregorio Smutko and other educated ministers continued to train Miskitu religious officials and others to appropriate Christian and Hebrew religious narratives as their own by infusing Miskitu culture into local doctrines. "Imagined community" building by ALPROMISU and religious networks eventually developed passed a strictly Miskitu nation to a larger pan-indigenous movement as they joined the World Council of Indigenous Peoples (WCIP). Even with international support, directors of ALPROMISU were not able to effectively organize to achieve indigenous rights under the Somoza dynasty.

=== During the Sandinista Revolution and the Contra War (1979-1990) ===
==== Miskitu, Sumo, Rama, Sandinista All Together: 1979-1986 ====
Immediately following the successful overthrow of the Somoza state by the Sandinista National Liberation Front (FSLN), ALPROMISU issued a declaration of demands to Daniel Ortega, the head of the new Sandinista government. ALPROMISU sought to obtain self-governance and the incorporation of indigenous language into educational reform programs. Soon after, however, ALPROMISU would be reorganized and renamed Miskitu, Sumo, Rama, Sandinista All Together (MISURASATA) under the new leadership of General Director Steadman Fagoth and Brooklyn Rivera, although Fagoth, with tremendous public support, would exercise control over MISURASATA.

MISURASATA would soon publish General Directions (1980), outlining indigenous people's place in Nicaragua and a strong sense of unity with the Sandinistas against exploitative foreign powers. However, MISURASATA was determined to establish autonomy for indigenous peoples and commissioned a mapping project so that indigenous lands and resources could be defined. Following the publication of the map in MISURASATA's next publication, Plan of Action 1981, MISURASATA leadership were arrested. Soon after, two militant factions separated from MISURASATA: MISURA, led by Steadman Fagoth, and Los Astros.

In the absence of Fagoth, Rivera became leader and spokesperson of MINSURASATA. Rivera, framing the Nicaraguan indigenous movement in terms of international human rights, continued to negotiate for indigenous land holdings. His actions were not seen as aligned with the national agenda and was subsequently seen as an enemy of the state after the Contra War broke out in December 1981. In part to garner forces for MISURA, Fagoth condemned Rivera on the radio by accusing him of working for the Sandinistas; within months, Rivera would leave Nicaragua for Honduras. By 1982 RIvera and other MINSURASATA members were fighting the FSLN with other forces, including the United States funded Revolutionary Democratic Alliance (ARDE) based in Costa Rica and led by Edén Pastora.

===== Los Astros: 1981-1982 =====
Approximately 60 Miskitu men left MISURASATA in response to Fagoth's leadership practices and created Los Astros. In December 1981, they fire the first gunshots against Sandinista military. Although they were not funded by the United States, the FSLN believed that they—and the other indigenous groups—had aligned with the United States to overthrow them. Consequently, the FSLN would send troops up to the Río Coco to attack indigenous rebel groups, resulting in the displacement of over 10,000 Miskitu. The military response would later be known as Navidad Roja, or Red Christmas.

===== Miskitu, Sumo, Rama Unity: 1981-1985 =====
After release from prison, Fagoth was allowed to go to the Caribbean coast to see his parents before leaving to study in Bulgaria. Instead, he fled to Honduras where he would recruit Miskitu men over the radio to join his newly formed counterinsurgency group, Miskitu, Sumo, Rama Unity (MISURA). The Central Intelligence Agency (CIA), supportive of Fagoth's anti-communist rhetoric would fund his efforts to overthrow the Sandinista government. The Nicaraguan Democratic Force (FDN) also supported MISURA.
