= Pantasma =

Valley in Northern Nicaragua

Coordinates: 13°22′N 85°57′W

Pantasma is a region in the north of Nicaragua. In the Miskito language the word Pantasma means small humans or flat head. The Spanish word Fantasma (Galician: Pantasma) origins from the Greek Phantasma and means ghost.

The Valle de Pantasma, also called the "Crater of Pantasma", is a circular valley over 12 km in diameter situated in Nicaragua. It is passed by the Rio Pantasma, a tributary of the Rio Coco (also called Rio Segovia). In its center lies the village of Las Praderas, the principal place of the community of Santa Maria de Pantasma with about 40,000 inhabitants in the province of Jinotega. In the poor, but fertile and agricultural intensely used valley corn, grain, fruit, and coffee are cultivated and cattle is bred.

The town is the site of one of the most famous actions of the civil war between the Sandinista government and the rebel Contras. On October 18, 1983, the Nicaraguan Democratic Force's Task Force Diriangén, under Comandante "Mike Lima," launched a surprise attack on the town, overrunning a battalion headquarters, detonating a munitions depot, robbing a state bank, and destroying a police station, a school, and all other government offices and facilities, leaving 47 defenders and residents dead. The assault was condemned as a "criminal action" by the Nicaraguan Ambassador to the United Nations in a letter to the UN Security Council, calling it "barbaric and inhumane" and is still seen as a symbol of Contra atrocities.

== Impact crater hypothesis ==
Some have hypothesized that the crater at Pantasma was formed when a large meteorite struck into the Tertiary effusive layers of the volcanic mountains in the north of Nicaragua. The circular shape of the crater, the skew of its floor according to the spacious mountain slope and its apparently arbitrary situation supports the thesis of a meteorite impact. A central uplift is missing or may already be covered with sediments. An ejection ring is not recognizable clearly in the rough landscape. The size and the shape of the crater are similar to the 10 km large and about one million years old crater of Lake Bosumtwi in Ghana.

In 2011, Povenmire et al. suggested that Central America is home to a tektite strewn field centered around Pantasma. The authors estimated the Central American strewn field to encompass portions of Honduras, Nicaragua, Guatemala, Belize, and southern Mexico. A 2019 study reported evidence for an impact origin of Pantasma, including the presence of melt-bearing breccia, impact glasses containing lechatelierite, coesite, the high-pressure silicon dioxide polymorph coesite, and extraterrestrial chromium isotope ratios. Argon dating of impact glasses suggests a crater age of $815 \pm 11$kyr, which is consistent with the age of impact-produced tektites in Belize, 530 km from Pantasma. The impact hypothesis is further supported by measurements showing that the elemental and isotopic compositions of Belize tektites match the composition of material from Pantasma. In 2022, Koeberl et al. emphasized that while the composition of Belize glasses could be consistent with an impact origin, the geochemical evidence is not conclusive; based on chemistry alone, a volcanic origin is also plausible. However, their low water content, presence of lechatelierite, and absence of crystalline phases indicate that the Belize glasses were formed by an impact.
