= Arturo Cruz =

Nicaraguan diplomat and politician (1923–2013)

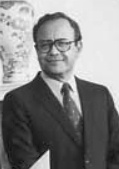
Arturo Cruz, 1981

Arturo José Cruz Porras (December 18, 1923 – July 9, 2013), sometimes called Arturo Cruz Sr. to distinguish him from his son, was a Nicaraguan banker and technocrat. He became prominent in politics during the Sandinista (FSLN) era. After repeatedly resigning from positions in protest, opinion divided between those who lauded him as a statesman and man of principle, and those who derided him as an ineffectual hand-wringer.

== Somoza opponent ==
Cruz grew up in Jinotepe, Nicaragua. His father Arturo Cruz Sánchez despised Anastasio Somoza García, despite the family's traditional Liberal loyalties. Cruz graduated from the military academy in 1944, but refused his commission rather than serve Somoza's dictatorship. He went on to attend Georgetown University in the United States. Cruz participated in a 1947 coup plot against Somoza, for which he was imprisoned for four months. After joining the April Rebellion of 1954, together with his brother-in-law, Adolfo Báez Bone, and Pedro Joaquín Chamorro Cardenal, he was jailed again for about a year, while Báez was executed. However, his wife persuaded him not to join Edmundo and Fernando "El Negro" Chamorro in their November 1960 rising, which included an attack on the Jinotepe barracks. He would avoid rebel politics for nearly two decades.

In 1969, Cruz became an official at the Inter-American Development Bank in Washington, D.C. There, he was approached by the FSLN in 1977. He became a member of Los Doce, the Group of Twelve establishment figures who voiced support for the Sandinista struggle against dictator Anastasio Somoza Debayle. Their backing of the Sandinistas' popular front convinced many Nicaraguans that the FSLN's appeal had broadened beyond its communist roots, and moved the country towards the full-scale insurrection that toppled the régime in July 1979.

== Sandinista opponent ==
Cruz was appointed head of the Central Bank of Nicaragua in post-Somoza Nicaragua. When the non-communist moderates resigned from the Junta of National Reconstruction in April 1980, after finding that the real power lay with the FSLN National Directorate, he joined the Junta as a replacement moderate on May 18. He too became frustrated with his impotence, but agreed to leave gracefully by becoming ambassador to the United States. The arrangement was announced on March 4, 1981.

Cruz continued to clash with Sandinista policies, and resigned as ambassador in November 1981, returning to the IADB. However, he was a major ghostwriter for the speech delivered by Sandinista hero Edén Pastora at his press conference of April 15, 1982, in which Pastora declared his break with the FSLN National Directorate. Pastora's speech helped convince his son, Arturo Cruz Jr., who was not then aware of his father's role, to also move from supporting the Sandinistas to joining Pastora's camp.

When the Sandinistas announced in January 1984 that they would hold elections in November, the right-wing opposition umbrella group, the Coordinadora Democrática Nicaragüense, settled on Cruz as the only candidate acceptable to all factions. However, in the end he boycotted the election, saying it would not be free and fair. Years later he admitted that his decision not to run was a mistake and that he was on the payroll of the CIA.

Afterwards, Cruz drifted deeper into the politics of the rebel Contras. He was a primary drafter of the San José Declaration of March 1, 1985, signed by many rebel leaders. The declaration evolved into the formation of the rebel umbrella group United Nicaraguan Opposition (UNO) on June 12, with Alfonso Robelo and the Nicaraguan Democratic Force's Adolfo Calero. However, with Calero's FDN comprising the great majority of UNO's forces, he found himself in another figurehead position. He continually threatened to resign unless he and Robelo were given real power. Despite Calero's eventual resignation in February 1987, he quit anyway on March 9.

In 1999, he issued a statement asking the United States and Honduran governments to release all information about the death of his nephew, David Arturo Báez Cruz, a naturalized American citizen and former Green Beret who returned to Nicaragua to serve in Sandinista military intelligence, and died while acting as a military advisor with Honduran guerrillas.
