= Fernando "El Negro" Chamorro =

Nicaraguan Contra (1933–1994)

Fernando Chamorro Rappaccioli (1933 – 6 September 1994), known as "El Negro" ("Blackie") for his dark complexion, was a Nicaraguan rebel fighting both the Somoza and Sandinista regimes. Efforts to build a Contra Southern Front around him played a part in the Iran–Contra affair.

== Somoza opponent ==
Chamorro, a descendant of Nicaragua's pre-eminent Conservative Party family, inherited a tradition of opposition to Somoza's Liberal-based regime. Beginning in the 1950s, he and his brother Edmundo waged sporadic actions against Somoza. Fernando participated in the April Rebellion of 1954 and the Olama y Mollejones invasion of 1959. The highlight of these early battles came with the seizure of the Diriamba and Jinotepe barracks on 11 November 1960.

In 1977, after his friend Edén Pastora rejoined the Sandinista National Liberation Front (FSLN), Chamorro met with Sandinista strategist Humberto Ortega and agreed to cooperate in the fight against Somoza. On 20 July 1978, Chamorro fired two rockets at Somoza's bunker from the InterContinental Hotel. Captured by the National Guard, he was among around fifty prisoners exchanged for hostages a month later, after Pastora seized the National Palace. During the civil war, Chamorro served with Pastora's southern front forces.

== Sandinista opponent ==
After the revolution, El Negro worked as a car salesman and affiliated with the new Social Democratic Party, before going into exile in July 1981. His brother Edmundo had already become a key figure in the military wing of the exile Nicaraguan Democratic Union (UDN), the Nicaraguan Revolutionary Armed Forces. Virulently opposed to the UDN's decision in August 1981 to merge with the former National Guardsmen of the 15th of September Legion into the Nicaraguan Democratic Force, they formed a breakaway that retained the UDN-FARN name.

In late February 1982, an assailant blew the door of his San José, Costa Rica apartment with explosives and fired inside, wounding his son, Fernando Chamoro Gonzalez, and two others.

El Negro and FARN became founding constituents of Edén Pastora's Democratic Revolutionary Alliance (ARDE) in September 1982. However, Pastora and his advisers sought to begin talks with the Sandinistas rather than immediately initiating armed struggle. By March, El Negro's impatience led him to break with Pastora and ally with the FDN. "The word 'dialogue' does not exist in our dictionary," he declared.

During the FDN's Operation Marathon in late September 1983, Chamorro led the FARN in an action at El Espino. The fighting crossed over the border, leading the Honduran government to expel El Negro.

Later, his forces moved back to Costa Rica, with the goal of absorbing the remnants of the ARDE into the Southern Front of UNO. Despite the rivalry, he and Pastora remained drinking buddies. In early 1986, most of Pastora's commanders agreed to align with Chamorro, and Pastora quit the struggle with a handful of remaining followers. By January 1987, however, Chamorro broke with UNO, and retired from the struggle in March. Chamorro returned to Nicaragua on 29 January 1988, under a government amnesty program, but did not repudiate the armed resistance.

Chamorro died on Tuesday, 6 September 1994, from an embolism he suffered two years before.
