= ARDE =

ARDE can refer to:

- Democratic Revolutionary Alliance, (Alianza Revolucionaria Democrática), a Contra group of the Southern Front guerrillas in Nicaragua that fought against the Marxist elements of the original Sandinista revolution in 1979
- Armament Research and Development Establishment, An Indian national defense laboratory under DRDO, located in Pune
- UK Armament Research and Development Establishment, created in 1955 and renamed Royal Armament Research and Development Establishment (RARDE) in 1962
- The Aspect Ratio Dependent Etching effect found in Deep reactive-ion etching.
