= El Almendro, Nicaragua =

El Almendro
- Municipality
- Location in Nicaragua
- Coordinates: 11°41′N 84°42′W
- Country: Nicaragua
- Department: Río San Juan

Area
  - Land: 390 sq mi (1,009 km^{2})

Population (2023 estimate)
  - Total: 15,242

El Almendro (meaning "The Almond Tree") is a municipality in the Río San Juan Department of southeastern Nicaragua. It occupied an area of 1,009 km^{2} (390 sq mi), and as per 2023 estimate, the municipality has a population of 15,242 individuals. The settlement was founded in 1892 by rubber tappers, while the municipality was officially created on 4 July 1974.

== History ==
During the Spanish colonial occupation, the location was used as a port on the Tepenaguasapa River to reach Lake Nicaragua. El Almendro was founded in 1892, when rubber tappers (huleros) and Ipecacuanha gatherers (raicilleros), including Nery López, Perfecto Romero Acosta, Francisco González, and others arrived in search of natural resources and settled permanently in the area. Over time, it attracted migrants from other parts of Nicaragua. During the late 19th and early 20th centuries, the local economy was strongly based on the extraction of rubber and raicilla (ipecacuanha root), and these products were traded extensively, with rubber production contributing significantly to the national exports. These activities declined after the mid-20th century, and by the 1960s, livestock rearing had become the dominant economic activity.

The municipality was officially created on 4 July 1974 as a result of the territorial separation from the municipality of Morrito. El Almendro was used as a resettlement area for former combatants of the Nicaraguan Resistance after the end of the Nicaraguan Revolution in 1990, and were provided land parcels as part of a national reintegration and reconciliation process.

== Geography and demographics ==
El Almendro is a municipality in the Río San Juan Department of southeastern Nicaragua. It occupied an area of 1,009 km^{2} (390 sq mi). As per 2023 estimate, the municipality has a population of 15,242 individuals of whom 7,969 were males and 7,273 were females. The rural population was 11,434 (75%) and the rest of the 25% was classified as urban.
