= Alfonso Robelo =

Nicaraguan businessman

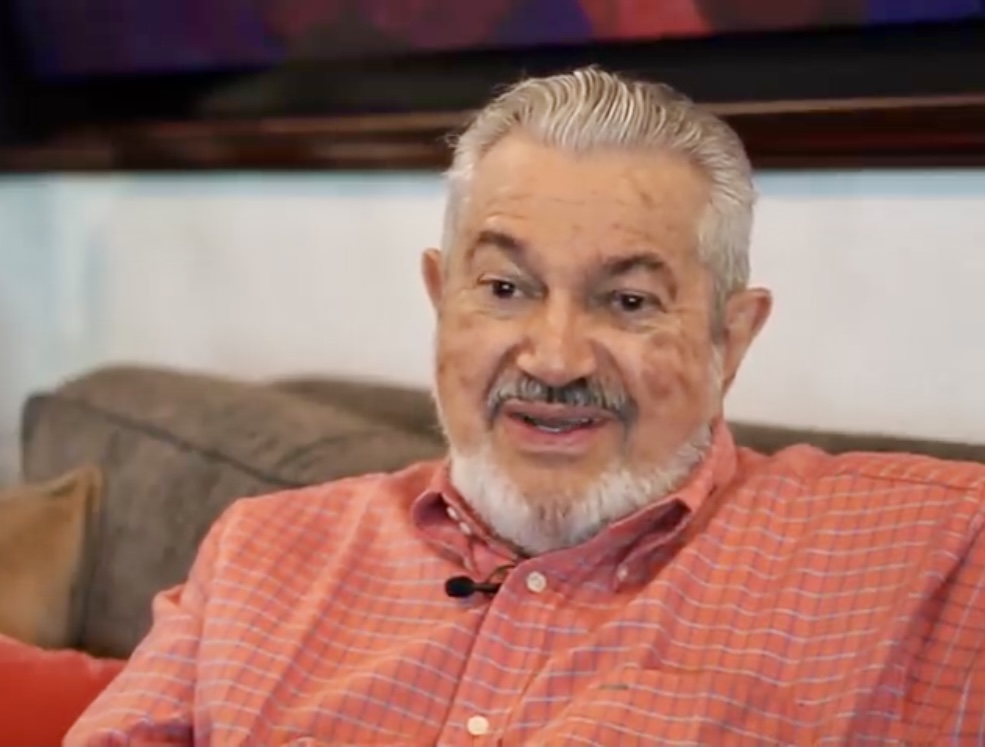
- Robelo in 2020
- Born: October 11, 1939 (age 86); Leon, Nicaragua
- Education: Rensselaer Polytechnic Institute
- Occupations: Politician, businessman

Luis Alfonso Robelo Callejas (born October 11, 1939), is a Nicaraguan businessman, was the founder of the Nicaraguan Democratic Movement (MDN).

== Early life and education ==
Luis Alfonso Robelo Callejas was born in Leon, Nicaragua on October 11, 1939. He grew up in a wealthy family and inherited a profitable vegetable oil company. He earned a degree in chemical engineering at Rensselaer Polytechnic Institute in Troy, New York in 1961. He is a member of the Latino fraternity Phi Iota Alpha, the oldest inter-collegiate Greek-letter organization established for Latino Americans.

== Career ==
Robelo was rector of the University of Central America from 1970 to 1972 and President of the Nicaraguan Chamber of Commerce until 1975. He then headed the Nicaraguan Development Institute, long active in the development of independent agricultural and small business cooperatives.

=== Political engagement ===
Following the assassination of La Prensa editor Pedro Joaquin Chamorro Cardenal in 1978, which turned sympathies against the Somoza regime, Robelo cofounded the Nicaraguan Democratic Movement, a social-democratic political party of businessmen, industrialists, and professionals opposed to the current government. A leader and main spokesman for FAO working openly against the regime, he was arrested and publicly labeled a "subversive" by Somoza.

Following the revolution, Robelo was one of the "moderates" on the five-member Junta of National Reconstruction intended rule Nicaragua after the overthrow of Anastasio Somoza Debayle. However, Robelo found that the real power lay with the FSLN National Directorate.

He resigned in April 1980 because of the Marxist tendencies in the FSLN-dominated government and the growing Cuban influence in the country. Became President of the Democratic Coordinating Board. Harassed by the FSLN after his resignation from the junta and detained by the Sandinistas when he sought to travel abroad in 1982, he was finally forced into exile later that year, and his property was confiscated. In 1982, he joined with Edén Pastora and others in founding the ARDE, seeking to achieve the original democratic goals of the revolution.

After resigning from the Junta on April 22, 1981, Robelo went into exile in 1982. He brought his MDN into Edén Pastora's rebel Democratic Revolutionary Alliance. Later, he split with Pastora, and joined the United Nicaraguan Opposition (UNO) with Arturo Cruz, and Adolfo Calero of the Nicaraguan Democratic Force. After UNO's collapse, he joined the directorate of the new Contra umbrella group, the Nicaraguan Resistance, in May 1987.

Following the Esquipulas accord, President Oscar Arias of Costa Rica announced in January 1988 that Contra leaders could no longer live in his country. With his pregnant wife opposing a move from Costa Rica, he resigned from the directorate in early 1988.

The post-Sandinista government of Violeta Chamorro appointed Robelo to be ambassador to Costa Rica. In 1993, he was taken hostage during a standoff at the embassy.

== Personal life ==
During the political turmoil, Robelo's first marriage, to Indiana Cardenal Caldera, ended in divorce. They had four children: Indiana Margarita, Luis Alfonso (who died at a year and a half old), Eliza, and Alejandra. He remarried a Costa Rican.
