= Junta of National Reconstruction =

1979–1985 government of Nicaragua

- Formation: 16 June 1979
- Extinction: 10 January 1985
- Jurisdiction: Nicaragua

Legislative branch
- Legislature: Interim Council of State (1980–1984)

Executive branch
- Leader: Coordinator of the Junta

The Junta of National Reconstruction (Spanish: Junta de Gobierno de Reconstrucción Nacional) was the provisional government of Nicaragua from the fall of the President Somoza in July 1979 until January 1985, with the election of Daniel Ortega (FSLN) as president of Nicaragua.

== Overview ==
The Sandinista rebels announced the Junta as its provisional government on June 16, 1979, as the civil war against Anastasio Somoza Debayle entered its final phase. It was composed of five members: a member of the FSLN directorate, Daniel Ortega, two left-wing activists, Sergio Ramírez and Moisés Hassan Morales, and two right-wing representatives, Alfonso Robelo and Violeta Barrios de Chamorro.

In the first half of July, United States government envoy William Bowdler pressured the Sandinistas to broaden the junta by adding more members, such as Adolfo Calero, Ismael Reyes, and Mariano Fiallos.

After the fall of Somoza, it quickly became apparent to Robelo and Chamorro that they did not have any real power and Chamorro resigned on April 19, 1980, followed by Robelo three days later. On May 18, they were replaced by Arturo Cruz and Rafael Córdova Rivas. Cruz would resign in March 1981, though he agreed for a time to be ambassador to the United States.

On March 4, Cruz's appointment to Washington was announced, together with Hassan's departure for the Council of State and Ortega's promotion to Coordinator of the now three-member junta. While the junta may have offered little authority to its non-Sandinista members, the public role did help to solidify Ortega's primacy within the FSLN directorate and enhance Ramírez's prominence.

The revolutionary government decided, in December 1981, to carry out the forced relocation of 42 Miskito indigenous communities from the border strip of the Coco River with Honduras to the interior of the country in new communities known as Tasba Pri ("Free Land"), in order to prevent them from providing logistical support to the Contras, This operation became known by the nickname Red Christmas. Opposition groups to the Sandinista government such as the Nicaraguan Democratic Force, much of the Catholic ecclesiastical hierarchy and the United States, as well as the indigenous organizations MISURASATA and MISURA, accused the Sandinistas of causing dozens of Miskito deaths during the process,

By the end of 1981, opposition to the Sandinista government consisted only of small groups of former members of the defeated National Guard and groups of former revolutionaries with thoughts and ideals different from those with which the FSLN wished to govern; these groups were mostly based in Honduras. From that point onward, however, these forces received military training from Argentine officers and covert support from the United States. Edén Pastora, a former revolutionary who defected from the government, established his guerrilla force on the border with Costa Rica, from where he experienced the La Penca bombing.

On November 4, 1984, a presidential election was held, which was won by leading junta member and revolutionary Daniel Ortega and his running mate, Sergio Ramírez as vice president. However, some opposition parties boycotted it, claiming unfair conditions. While the Reagan administration and many mainstream United States media outlets alleged the election would be neither free nor fair, numerous electoral watchers affiliated with Western European governments, as well as United States non-governmental organizations, declared the results legitimate. Ortega took office on January 10, 1985, and the junta was dissolved.

== See also ==
- Sandinista National Liberation Front
- Fidel Castro
- Revolutionary Government Junta of El Salvador

Political offices
Preceded by Francisco Urcuyo	Presidency of Nicaragua; July 18, 1979 – January 10, 1985	Succeeded by Daniel Ortega
