= Contras =

1979–1990 anti-Marxist Nicaraguan rebels

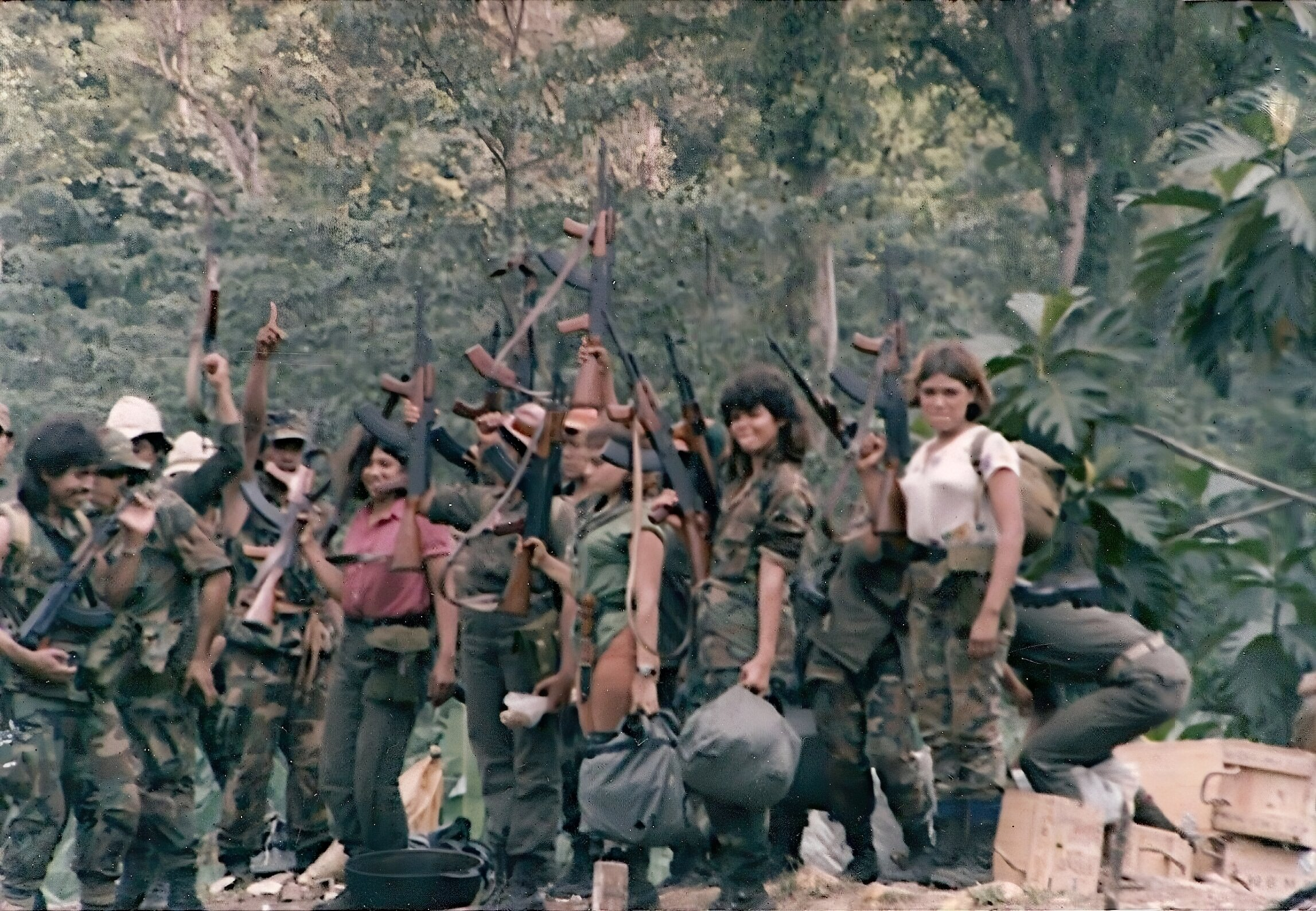
- The Nicaraguan Contras in Nueva Guinea in 1987
- Leaders: Adolfo Calero; Enrique Bermúdez; Comandante Franklin (FDN); Cúpula of 6 regional commanders (ARDE and Frente Sur (Note: lit. 'Southern Front")); Comandante Blas (YATAMA); Steadman Fagoth (MISURA)
- Dates active: 1979–1990
- Groups: FDN, ARDE, Frente Sur, YATAMA, MISURA
- Active regions: Nicaragua (Note: All rural areas of Nicaragua, especially the highland departments of Matagalpa, Jinotega, Nueva Segovia, and Chontales. Also including the departments of Río San Juan and western Zelaya. Excluding some Pacific regions like Managua and Granada.)
- Ideology: Anti-communism; Right-wing populism; Conservatism; Capitalism
- Political position: Right-wing
- Size: 16,000 (1986)
- Wars: Cold War: Contra war

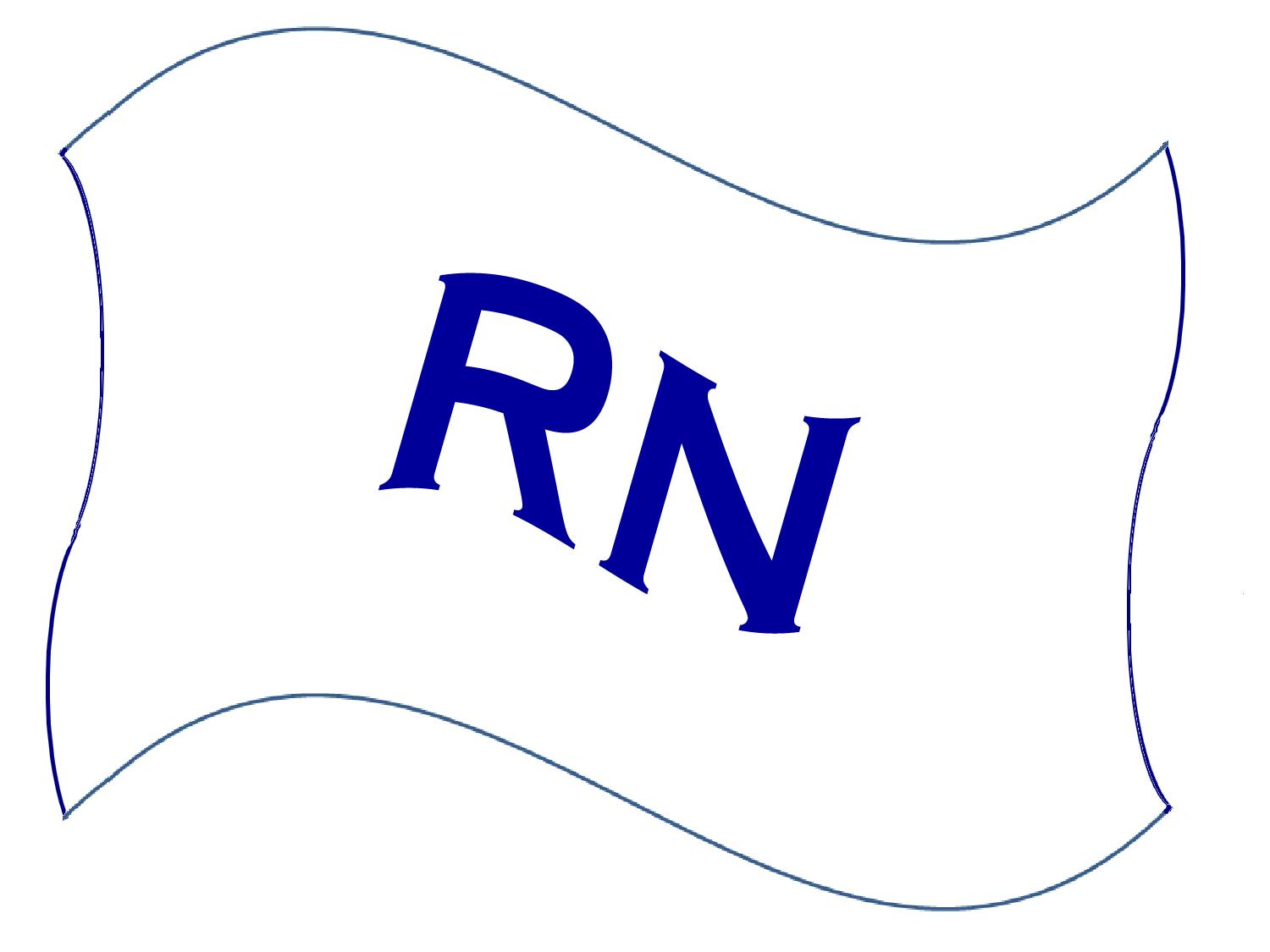
Flag used by the Contras, RN stands for Resistencia nicaragüense.

The Contras (from Spanish: contrarrevolucionarios, lit. 'counter-revolutionaries') were the anti-communist rebels who waged a guerrilla war against the Marxist Sandinista National Liberation Front (FSLN) and the Junta of National Reconstruction, which came to power after the Nicaraguan Revolution in 1979. The insurgency against the Sandinista government lasted from 1979 until 1990, and was one of the highest profile conflicts of the Cold War.

In July 1979, the FSLN took control of the capital Managua after weeks of heavy fighting. The president at the time, Anastasio Somoza Debayle, fled the country and relinquished control of the central government, leaving the Sandinistas in power. The Sandinistas created a junta that acted as an interim government immediately after. Various groups were created in response to this, consisting of dissidents of the new government and members of the former National Guard. These groups would regularly meet and establish the Contras in 1980.

During the insurgency, the United States and several other countries provided military assistance and financial aid to the Contras. In 1981, the CIA and Argentina's Secretariat of Intelligence persuaded several Contra groups to unite into the larger Nicaraguan Democratic Force (FDN).

In 1982, the Boland Amendment was passed to end U.S. aid to the Contras; yet the Reagan administration continued to illegally fund the Contras, which resulted in a scandal known as the Iran–Contra affair. By 1987, most of the Contra militias had united into the Nicaraguan Resistance, within which the Nicaraguan Democratic Force was the largest group.

During the war, the Contras' tactics featured terrorism and human rights violations against civilians. The Reagan administration contended that the Contras' tactics did not include deliberate attacks against civilians. The CIA said that Contra terrorism resulted from "the poor discipline characteristic of irregular forces", that terrorism was not an official military doctrine of the Contras, and that the Contra leader responsible, Comandante Suicida, was executed. The Global Terrorism Database reports that Contras carried out more than 1,300 terrorist attacks.

After a cutoff in U.S. military support, and with both sides facing international pressure to bring an end to the conflict, the contras agreed to negotiations with the FSLN. With the help of five Central American presidents, including Daniel Ortega (then-President of Nicaragua), the sides agreed that a voluntary demobilization of the Contras should start in early December 1989. They chose this date to facilitate free and fair elections in Nicaragua in February 1990.

== History ==
=== Origins ===
The Contras were not a monolithic group, but a combination of three distinct elements of Nicaraguan society:

- Ex-guardsmen of the Nicaraguan National Guard and other right-wing figures who fought in Anastasio Somoza García's government before Somoza's government collapsed in 1979. The guardsmen later comprised a significant portion of the Nicaraguan Democratic Force (FDN), the largest Contra organization. Remnants of the Guard later formed groups such as the Fifteenth of September Legion, the Anti-Sandinista Guerrilla Special Forces, and the National Army of Liberation. Initially however, these groups were small and conducted little active raiding into Nicaragua.
- Anti-Somoza activists who supported the revolution but felt betrayed by the Sandinista government, such as Édgar Chamorro, a member of the FDN's political directorate, and José Francisco Cardenal, who briefly served in the Council of State before leaving Nicaragua following a disagreement with the Sandinista government's policies and founding the Nicaraguan Democratic Union (UDN), an opposition group of Nicaraguan exiles based in Miami. Another example was MILPAS (Milicias Populares Anti-Sandinistas), a peasant militia led by disillusioned Sandinista veterans from the northern mountains. Founded by Pedro Joaquín González, known as "Dimas", the Milpistas were also known as chilotes (green corn). Following Dimas' death, MILPAS bands emerged in 1980 and 1981. The Milpistas were composed largely of campesino (peasant) highlanders and rural workers.
- Nicaraguans who had avoided direct involvement in the revolution but opposed the Sandinistas.

=== Main groups ===
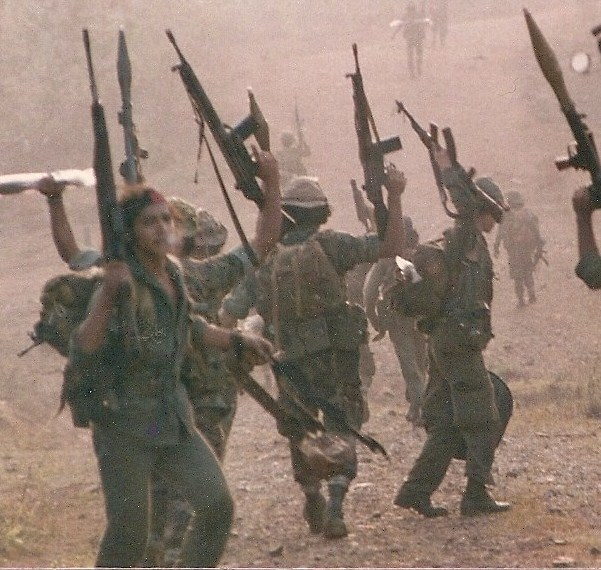
Contra Commandos from FDN and ARDE in the Nueva Guinea region of Nicaragua in 1987

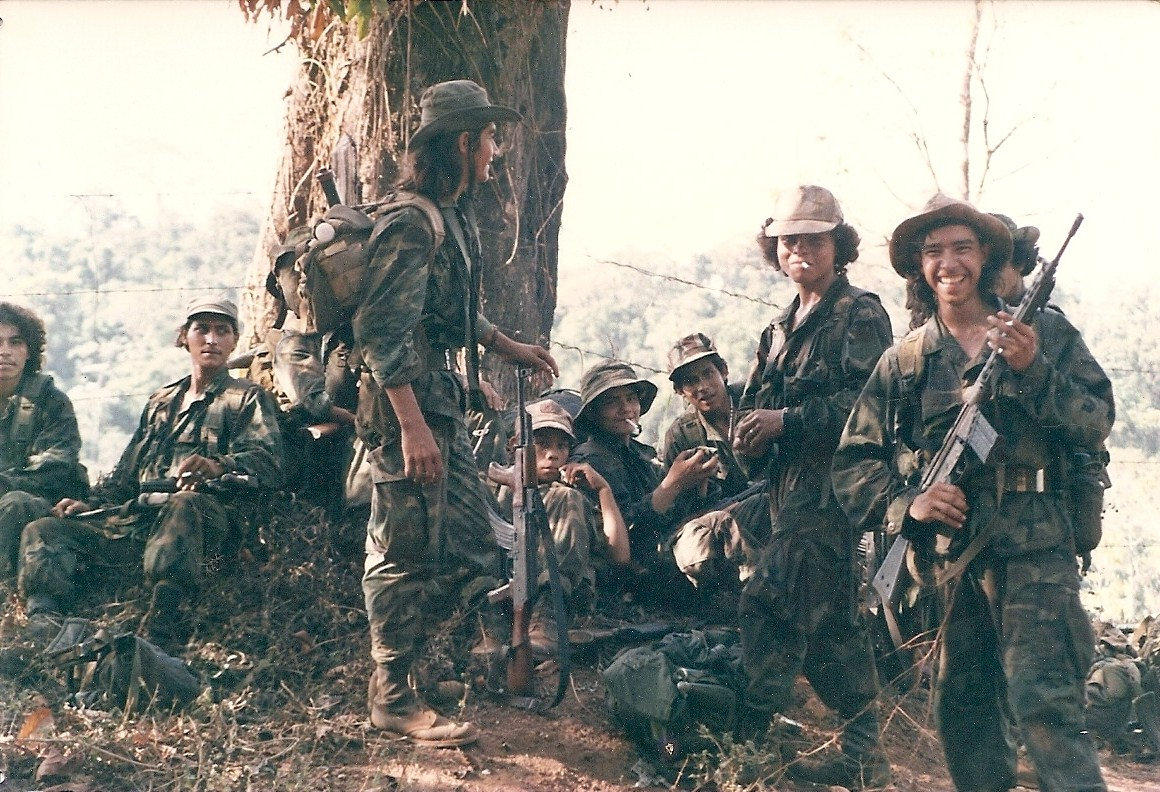
Members of ARDE

In September 1981, the CIA and Argentina's intelligence agency, seeking to unify the anti-Sandinista cause before initiating large scale aid, persuaded 15 September Legion, the UDN, and several former smaller groups to merge as the Nicaraguan Democratic Force, which was known in Spanish as Fuerza Democrática Nicaragüense and was often referred to as FDN, a Spanish acronym.

The FDN was led by Enrique Bermudez, its military commander, who led its war efforts against the Sandinistas, and Adolfo Calero Portocarrero, a Nicaraguan businessman who opposed the Somoza regime and led its political directorate. Édgar Chamorro later said that the UDN opposed working with the Guardsmen and that the merging only took place because of insistence by the CIA.

Based in Honduras, Nicaragua's northern neighbor, under the command of former National Guard Colonel Enrique Bermúdez, the new FDN began recruiting other smaller insurgent forces in the north. Largely financed, trained, equipped, armed and organized by the U.S., it emerged as the largest and most active Contra group.

In April 1982, Edén Pastora (Comandante Cero), one of the heroes in the fight against Somoza, organized the Sandinista Revolutionary Front (FRS) – embedded in the Democratic Revolutionary Alliance (ARDE) – and declared war on the Sandinista government. Himself a former Sandinista who had held several high posts in the government, he had resigned abruptly in 1981 and defected, believing that the newly found power had corrupted the Sandinistas' original ideas. A popular and charismatic leader, Pastora initially saw his group develop quickly. He confined himself to operate in the southern part of Nicaragua; after a press conference he was holding on 30 May 1984 was bombed, he "voluntarily withdrew" from the Contra struggle.

A third force, Misurasata, appeared among the Miskito, Mayangna and Rama Amerindian peoples of Nicaragua's Atlantic coast, who in December 1981 found themselves in conflict with the authorities following the government's efforts to nationalize Indian land. In the course of this conflict, forced removal of at least 10,000 Indians to relocation centers in the interior of the country and subsequent burning of some villages took place. The Misurasata movement split in 1983, with the breakaway Misura group of Stedman Fagoth Muller, which aligned more closely with the FDN, and the rest accommodating themselves with the Sandinistas: on 8 December 1984 a ceasefire agreement known as the Bogota Accord was signed by Misurasata and the Nicaraguan government. A subsequent autonomy statute in September 1987 largely defused Miskito resistance.

=== Unity efforts ===
In June 1985 most of the groups reorganized as the United Nicaraguan Opposition (UNO), under the leadership of Adolfo Calero, Arturo Cruz, and Alfonso Robelo, each of whom opposed the Sandinista revolution. After UNO's dissolution early in 1987, the Nicaraguan Resistance (RN) was organized along similar lines in May.

== U.S. military and financial assistance ==
In front of the International Court of Justice, the Nicaraguan government claimed that the Contras were altogether a creation of the U.S. This claim was rejected but the evidence of a very close relationship between the Contras and the United States was considered overwhelming and incontrovertible. The U.S. played a very large role in financing, training, arming, and advising the Contras over a long period, and it is unlikely that the Contras would have been capable of carrying out significant military operations without this support, given the large amount of training and weapons shipments that the Sandinistas had received from Cuba and the Soviet Union.

=== Political background ===
The U.S. government viewed the leftist Sandinistas as a threat to economic interests of American corporations in Nicaragua and to national security. U.S. President Ronald Reagan stated in 1983 that "The defense of [the USA's] southern frontier" was at stake. "In spite of the Sandinista victory being declared fair, the United States continued to oppose the left-wing Nicaraguan government." and opposed its ties to Cuba and the Soviet Union. Ronald Reagan, who had assumed the American presidency in January 1981, accused the Sandinistas of importing Cuban-style socialism and aiding leftist guerrillas in El Salvador. The Reagan administration continued to view the Sandinistas as undemocratic despite the 1984 Nicaraguan elections being generally declared fair by foreign observers. Throughout the 1980s the Sandinista government was regarded as "Partly Free" by Freedom House, an organization financed by the U.S. government.

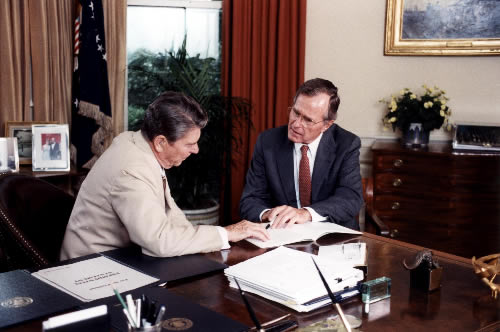
U.S. President Ronald Reagan and Vice President George Bush in 1984. Under the Reagan Doctrine, the Reagan administration provided overt and covert assistance to the Contras.

On 4 January 1982, Reagan signed the top secret National Security Decision Directive 17 (NSDD-17), giving the CIA the authority to recruit and support the Contras with $19 million in military aid. The effort to support the Contras was one component of the Reagan Doctrine, which called for providing military support to movements opposing Soviet-supported, communist governments.

By December 1981, the United States had already begun to support armed opponents of the Sandinista government. From the beginning, the CIA was in charge. The arming, clothing, feeding, and supervision of the Contras became the most ambitious paramilitary and political action operation mounted by the agency in nearly a decade.

In the fiscal year 1984, the U.S. Congress approved $24 million in aid to the Contras. After this, since the Contras failed to win widespread popular support or military victories within Nicaragua, opinion polls indicated that a majority of the U.S. public was not supportive of the Contras, the Reagan administration lost much of its support regarding its Contra policy within Congress after disclosure of CIA mining of Nicaraguan ports, and a report of the Bureau of Intelligence and Research commissioned by the State Department found Reagan's allegations about Soviet influence in Nicaragua "exaggerated", Congress cut off all funds for the Contras in 1985 by the third Boland Amendment. The Boland Amendment had first been passed by Congress in December 1982. At this time, it only outlawed U.S. assistance to the contras "for the purpose of overthrowing the Nicaraguan government", while allowing assistance for other purposes. In October 1984, it was amended to forbid action by not only the Defense Department and the Central Intelligence Agency but all U.S. government agencies.

Nevertheless, the case for support of the Contras continued to be made in Washington, D.C., by both the Reagan administration and the Heritage Foundation, which argued that support for the Contras would counter Soviet influence in Nicaragua.

On 1 May 1985 President Reagan announced that his administration perceived Nicaragua to be "an unusual and extraordinary threat to the national security and foreign policy of the United States", and declared a "national emergency" and a trade embargo against Nicaragua to "deal with that threat". It "is now a given; it is true", the Washington Post declared in 1986, "the Sandinistas are communists of the Cuban or Soviet school"; that "The Reagan administration is right to take Nicaragua as a serious menace—to civil peace and democracy in Nicaragua and to the stability and security of the region"; that we must "fit Nicaragua back into a Central American mode" and "turn Nicaragua back toward democracy", and with the "Latin American democracies" "demand reasonable conduct by regional standard."

Soon after the embargo was established, Managua re-declared "a policy of nonalignment" and sought the aid of Western Europe, who were opposed to U.S. policy, to escape dependency on the Soviet Union. Since 1981 U.S. pressures had curtailed Western credit to and trade with Nicaragua, forcing the government to rely almost totally on the Eastern bloc for credit, other aid, and trade by 1985. In his 1997 study on U.S. low intensity warfare, Kermit D. Johnson, a former Chief of the U.S. Army Chaplains, contends that U.S. hostility toward the revolutionary government was motivated not by any concern for "national security", but rather by what the world relief organization Oxfam termed "the threat of a good example":

It was alarming that in just a few months after the Sandinista revolution, Nicaragua received international acclaim for its rapid progress in the fields of literacy and health. It was alarming that a socialist-mixed-economy state could do in a few short months what the Somoza dynasty, a U.S. client state, could not do in 45 years! It was truly alarming that the Sandinistas were intent on providing the very services that establish a government's political and moral legitimacy.

The government's program included increased wages, subsidized food prices, and expanded health, welfare, and education services. And though it nationalized Somoza's former properties, it preserved a private sector that accounted for between 50 and 60 percent of GDP.

=== Atrocities ===
The United States began to support Contra activities against the Sandinista government by December 1981, with the CIA at the forefront of operations. The CIA supplied the funds and the equipment, coordinated training programs, and provided intelligence and target lists. While the Contras had little military successes, they did “prove adept at carrying out CIA guerrilla warfare strategies from training manuals which advised them to incite mob violence, "neutralize" civilian leaders and government officials and attack "soft targets"”. The agency added to the Contras' sabotage efforts by blowing up refineries and pipelines, and mining ports. (Note: As recounted by Holly Sklar, the CIA manual, Tayacan, advises the paramilitaries "to neutralize carefully selected and planned targets, such as court judges etc." In the section entitled "Implicit and Explicit Terror", the manual states that it is necessary to "kidnap all officials or agents of the Sandinista government" or "individuals in tune with the regime", who then should be removed from the town "without damaging them publicly".) Finally, according to former Contra leader Edgar Chamorro, CIA trainers also gave Contra soldiers large knives. "A commando knife [was given], and our people, everybody wanted to have a knife like that, to kill people, to cut their throats". In 1985 Newsweek published a series of photos taken by Frank Wohl, a conservative student admirer traveling with the Contras, entitled "Execution in the Jungle":

The victim dug his own grave, scooping the dirt out with his hands ... He crossed himself. Then a contra executioner knelt and rammed a k-bar knife into his throat. A second enforcer stabbed at his jugular, then his abdomen. When the corpse was finally still, the contras threw dirt over the shallow grave—and walked away.

The CIA officer in charge of the covert war, Duane "Dewey" Clarridge, admitted to the House Intelligence Committee staff in a secret briefing in 1984 that the Contras were routinely murdering "civilians and Sandinista officials in the provinces, as well as heads of cooperatives, nurses, doctors and judges". But he claimed that this did not violate President Reagan's executive order prohibiting assassinations because the agency defined it as just 'killing'. "After all, this is war—a paramilitary operation", Clarridge said in conclusion. Edgar Chamorro explained the rationale behind this to a U.S. reporter. "Sometimes terror is very productive. This is the policy, to keep putting pressure until the people cry 'uncle'". The CIA manual for the Contras, Tayacan, states that the Contras should gather the local population for a public tribunal to "shame, ridicule and humiliate" Sandinista officials to "reduce their influence". It also recommends gathering the local population to witness and take part in public executions. These types of activities continued throughout the war.

In April 1987, an American aid worker named Benjamin Linder was killed by Contras. After the signing of the Central American Peace Accord in August 1987, the year war related deaths and economic destruction reached its peak, the Contras eventually entered negotiations with the Sandinista government (1988), and the war began to deescalate.

By 1989 the war and economic isolation had inflicted severe economic suffering on Nicaraguans. Nicaraguans had been exhausted from the war, which had cost 30,865 lives. By the late 1980s Nicaragua's internal conditions had changed radically. A united opposition of 14 political parties organized into the National Opposition Union (Unión Nacional Oppositora, UNO) with the support of the United States National Endowment for Democracy. UNO presidential nominee Violeta Chamorro was received by President George H. W. Bush at the White House.

The Contra war escalated over the year before the election. The U.S. promised to end the economic embargo should Chamorro win.

The UNO scored a decisive victory on 25 February 1990. Chamorro won with 55 percent of the presidential vote as compared to Daniel Ortega's 41 percent. Of 92 seats in the National Assembly, UNO gained 51, and the FSLN won 39. On 25 April 1990, Chamorro assumed presidency from Ortega.

=== Illegal covert operations ===
With Congress blocking further aid to the Contras, the Reagan administration sought to arrange funding and military supplies by means of third countries and private sources. Between 1984 and 1986, $34 million from third countries and $2.7 million from private sources were raised this way. The secret Contra assistance was run by the National Security Council, with officer Lieutenant Colonel Oliver North in charge. With the third-party funds, North created an organization called The Enterprise, which served as the secret arm of the NSC staff and had its own airplanes, pilots, airfield, ship, operatives, and secret Swiss bank accounts. It also received assistance from personnel from other government agencies, especially from CIA personnel in Central America. This operation functioned, however, without any of the accountability required of U.S. government activities. The Enterprise's efforts culminated in the Iran–Contra Affair of 1986–1987, which facilitated Contra funding through the proceeds of arms sales to Iran.

According to the London Spectator, U.S. journalists in Central America had long known that the CIA was flying in supplies to the Contras inside Nicaragua before the scandal broke. No journalist paid it any attention until the alleged CIA supply man, Eugene Hasenfus, was shot down and captured by the Nicaraguan army. Similarly, reporters neglected to investigate many leads indicating that Oliver North was running the Contra operation from his office in the National Security Council.

According to the National Security Archive, Oliver North had been in contact with Manuel Noriega, the military leader of Panama later convicted on drug charges, whom he personally met. The issue of drug money and its importance in funding the Nicaraguan conflict was the subject of various reports and publications. The contras were funded by drug trafficking, of which the United States was aware. Senator John Kerry's 1988 Committee on Foreign Relations report on Contra drug links concluded that "senior U.S. policy makers were not immune to the idea that drug money was a perfect solution to the Contras' funding problems".

The Reagan administration's support for the Contras continued to stir controversy well into the 1990s. In August 1996, San Jose Mercury News reporter Gary Webb published a series titled Dark Alliance, alleging that the Contras contributed to the rise of crack cocaine in California.

Gary Webb's career as a journalist was subsequently discredited by the leading U.S. papers, The New York Times, the Washington Post, and the Los Angeles Times. An internal CIA report, entitled, "Managing a Nightmare", shows the agency used "a ground base of already productive relations with journalists" to help counter what it called "a genuine public relations crisis." In the 1980s, Douglas Farah worked as a journalist, covering the civil wars in Central America for the Washington Post. According to Farah, while it was common knowledge that the Contras were involved in cocaine trafficking, the editors of the Washington Post refused to take it seriously:

If you're talking about our intelligence community tolerating – if not promoting – drugs to pay for black ops, it's rather an uncomfortable thing to do when you're an establishment paper like the Post. If you were going to be directly rubbing up against the government, they wanted it more solid than it could probably ever be done.

An investigation by the United States Department of Justice also stated that their "review did not substantiate the main allegations stated and implied in the Mercury News articles." Regarding the specific charges towards the CIA, the DOJ wrote "the implication that the drug trafficking by the individuals discussed in the Mercury News articles was connected to the CIA was also not supported by the facts." The CIA also investigated and rejected the allegations.

=== Propaganda ===
During the time the U.S. Congress blocked funding for the contras, the Reagan government engaged in a campaign to alter public opinion and change the vote in Congress on contra aid. For this purpose, the NSC established an interagency working group, which in turn coordinated the Office of Public Diplomacy for Latin America and the Caribbean (managed by Otto Reich), which conducted the campaign. The S/LPD produced and widely disseminated a variety of pro-contra publications, arranged speeches and press conferences. It also disseminated "white propaganda"—pro-Contra newspaper articles by paid consultants who did not disclose their connection to the Reagan administration.

On top of that, Oliver North helped Carl Channell's tax-exempt organization, the National Endowment for the Preservation of Liberty, to raise $10 million, by arranging numerous briefings for groups of potential contributors at the premises of the White House and by facilitating private visits and photo sessions with President Reagan for major contributors. Channell in turn, used part of that money to run a series of television advertisements directed at home districts of Congressmen considered swing votes on Contra aid. Out of the $10 million raised, more than $1 million was spent on pro-Contra publicity.

=== International Court of Justice ruling ===
In 1984 the Sandinista government filed a suit in the International Court of Justice (ICJ) against the United States (Nicaragua v. United States), which resulted in a 1986 judgment against the United States. The ICJ held that the U.S. had violated international law as well as a 1956 treaty by supporting the contras in their rebellion against the Nicaraguan government and by mining Nicaragua's harbors. Regarding the alleged human rights violations by the contras, however, the ICJ took the view that the United States could be held accountable for them only if it would have been proven that the U.S. had effective control of the Contra operations resulting in these alleged violations. Nevertheless, the ICJ found that the U.S. encouraged acts contrary to general principles of humanitarian law by producing the manual Psychological Operations in Guerrilla Warfare (Operaciones sicológicas en guerra de guerrillas) and disseminating it to the Contras. The manual, amongst other things, advised on how to rationalize killings of civilians and recommended to hire professional killers for specific selective tasks.

The United States, which did not participate in the merits phase of the proceedings, maintained that the ICJ's power did not supersede the Constitution of the United States and argued that the court did not seriously consider the Nicaraguan role in El Salvador, while it accused Nicaragua of actively supporting armed groups there, specifically in the form of supply of arms. The ICJ had found that evidence of a responsibility of the Nicaraguan government in this matter was insufficient. The U.S. argument was affirmed, however, by the dissenting opinion of ICJ member U.S. Judge Schwebel, who concluded that in supporting the Contras, the United States acted lawfully in collective self-defence in El Salvador's support. The U.S. blocked enforcement of the ICJ judgment by the United Nations Security Council and thereby prevented Nicaragua from obtaining any actual compensation. The Nicaraguan government finally withdrew the complaint from the court in September 1992 (under the later, post-FSLN, government of Violeta Chamorro), following a repeal of the law requiring the country to seek compensation.

== Human rights violations ==
Americas Watch, which subsequently became part of Human Rights Watch, accused the Contras of:

- targeting health care clinics and health care workers for assassination
- kidnapping civilians
- torturing civilians
- executing civilians, including children, who were captured in combat
- raping women
- indiscriminately attacking civilians and civilian houses
- seizing civilian property
- burning civilian houses in captured towns.

Human Rights Watch released a report on the situation in 1989, which stated: "[The] contras were major and systematic violators of the most basic standards of the laws of armed conflict, including by launching indiscriminate attacks on civilians, selectively murdering non-combatants, and mistreating prisoners."

In his affidavit to the World Court, former contra Edgar Chamorro testified that "The CIA did not discourage such tactics. To the contrary, the Agency severely criticized me when I admitted to the press that the FDN had regularly kidnapped and executed agrarian reform workers and civilians. We were told that the only way to defeat the Sandinistas was to ...kill, kidnap, rob and torture".

Contra leader Adolfo Calero denied that his forces deliberately targeted civilians: "What they call a cooperative is also a troop concentration full of armed people. We are not killing civilians. We are fighting armed people and returning fire when fire is directed at us."

=== Controversy ===
Several articles were published by the U.S. press, including by The Wall Street Journal and The New Republic, accusing Americas Watch and other bodies of ideological bias and unreliable reporting. The articles alleged that Americas Watch gave too much credence to alleged Contra abuses and systematically tried to discredit Nicaraguan human rights groups, such as the Permanent Commission on Human Rights, which blamed most human rights abuses on the Sandinistas.

In 1985, The Wall Street Journal reported:

Three weeks ago, Americas Watch issued a report on human rights abuses in Nicaragua. One member of the Permanent Commission for Human Rights commented on the Americas Watch report and its chief investigator Juan Mendez: "The Sandinistas are laying the groundwork for a totalitarian society here and yet all Mendez wanted to hear about were abuses by the contras. How can we get people in the U.S. to see what's happening here when so many of the groups who come down are pro-Sandinista?"

Human Rights Watch, the umbrella organization of Americas Watch, replied to these allegations: "Almost invariably, U.S. pronouncements on human rights exaggerated and distorted the real human rights violations of the Sandinista regime, and exculpated those of the U.S.-supported insurgents, known as the contras ... The Bush administration is responsible for these abuses, not only because the contras are, for all practical purposes, a U.S. force, but also because the Bush administration has continued to minimize and deny these violations, and has refused to investigate them seriously."

== Military successes and election of Violeta Chamorro ==
By 1986 the Contras were besieged by charges of corruption, human-rights abuses, and military ineptitude. A much-vaunted early 1986 offensive never materialized, and Contra forces were largely reduced to isolated acts of terrorism. In October 1987, however, the contras staged a successful attack in southern Nicaragua. Then on 21 December 1987, the FDN launched attacks at Bonanza, Siuna, and Rosita in Zelaya province, resulting in heavy fighting. ARDE Frente Sur attacked at El Almendro and along the Rama road. These large-scale raids mainly became possible as the contras were able to use U.S.-provided Redeye missiles against Sandinista Mi-24 helicopter gunships, which had been supplied by the Soviets. Nevertheless, the Contras remained tenuously encamped within Honduras and were not able to hold Nicaraguan territory.

There were isolated protests among the population against the draft implemented by the Sandinista government, which even resulted in full-blown street clashes in Masaya in 1988. However, a June 1988 survey in Managua showed the Sandinista government still enjoyed strong support but that support had declined since 1984. Three times as many people identified with the Sandinistas (28%) than with all the opposition parties put together (9%); 59% did not identify with any political party. Of those polled, 85% opposed any further US aid to the Contras; 40% believed the Sandinista government to be democratic, while 48% believed it to be not democratic. People identified the war as the largest problem but were less likely to blame it for economic problems compared to a December 1986 poll; 19% blamed the war and US blockade as the main cause of economic problems while 10% blamed the government. Political opposition groups were splintered and the Contras began to experience defections, although United States aid maintained them as a viable military force.

After a cutoff in U.S. military support, and with both sides facing international pressure to bring an end to the conflict, the contras agreed to negotiations with the FSLN. With the help of five Central American presidents, including Ortega, the sides agreed that a voluntary demobilization of the contras should start in early December 1989. They chose this date to facilitate free and fair elections in Nicaragua in February 1990 (even though the Reagan administration had pushed for a delay of contra disbandment).

In the resulting February 1990 elections, Violeta Chamorro and her party the UNO won an upset victory of 55% to 41% over Daniel Ortega. Opinion polls leading up to the elections divided along partisan lines, with 10 of 17 polls analyzed in a contemporary study predicting an UNO victory while seven predicted the Sandinistas would retain power.

Possible explanations include that the Nicaraguan people were disenchanted with the Ortega government as well as the fact that already in November 1989, the White House had announced that the economic embargo against Nicaragua would continue unless Violeta Chamorro won. Also, there had been reports of intimidation from the side of the Contras, with a Canadian observer mission claiming that 42 people were killed by the Contras in "election violence" in October 1989. Sandinistas were also accused of intimidation and abuses during the election campaign. According to the Puebla Institute, by mid-December 1989, seven opposition leaders had been murdered, 12 had disappeared, 20 had been arrested, and 30 others assaulted. In late January 1990, the OAS observer team reported that "a convoy of troops attacked four truckloads of UNO sympathizers with bayonets and rifle butts, threatening to kill them." This led many commentators to conclude that Nicaraguans voted against the Sandinistas out of fear of a continuation of the Contra war and economic deprivation.

Maps of rebel militias in Nicaragua (1984 – 1988)
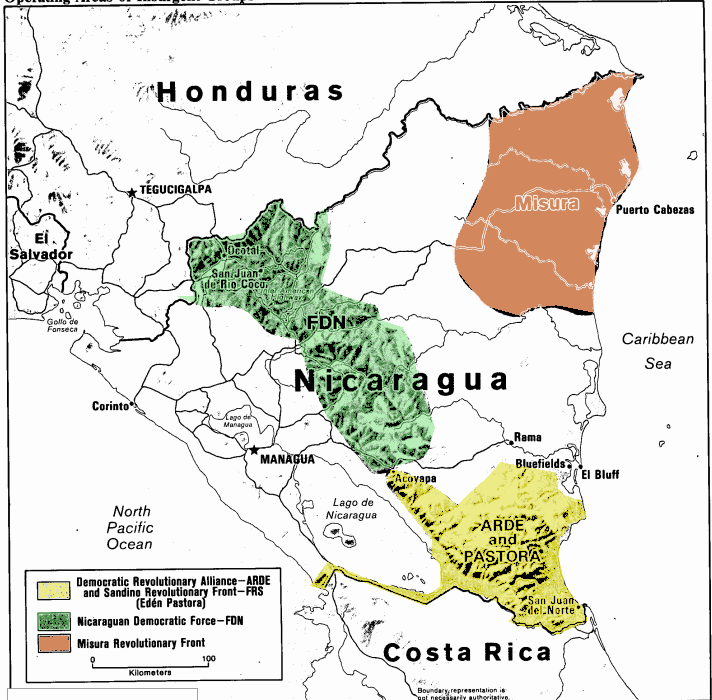
1984

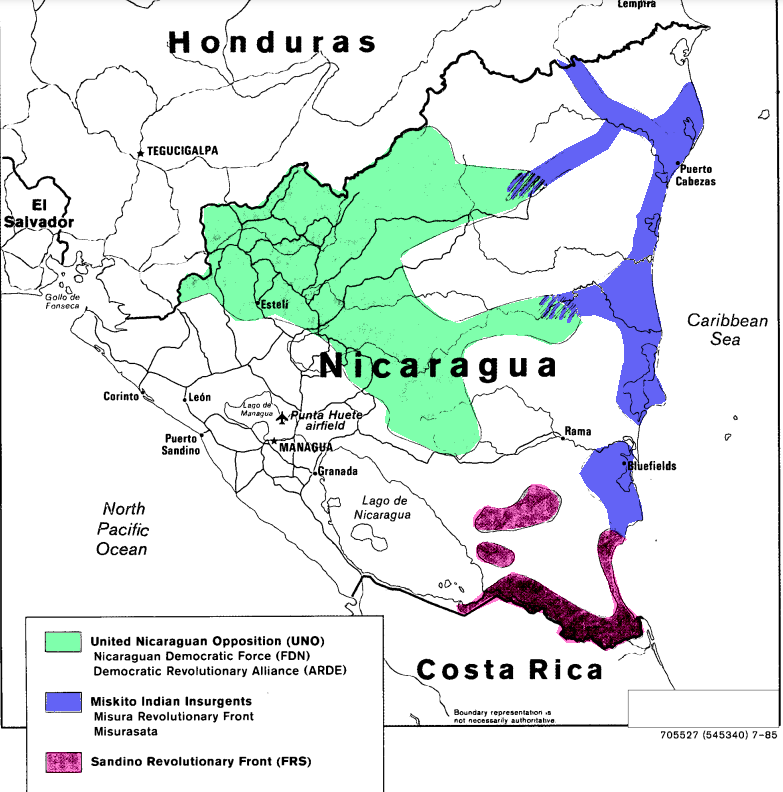
1985

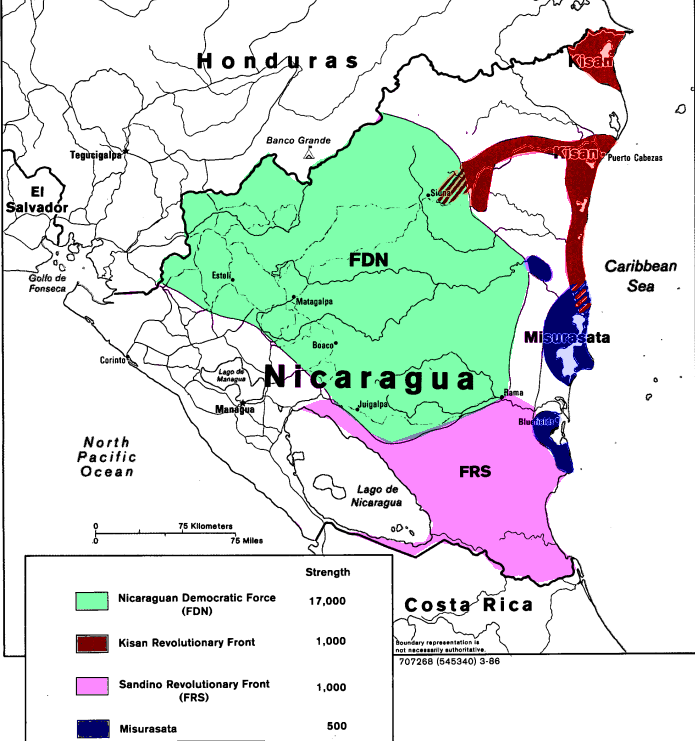
1986

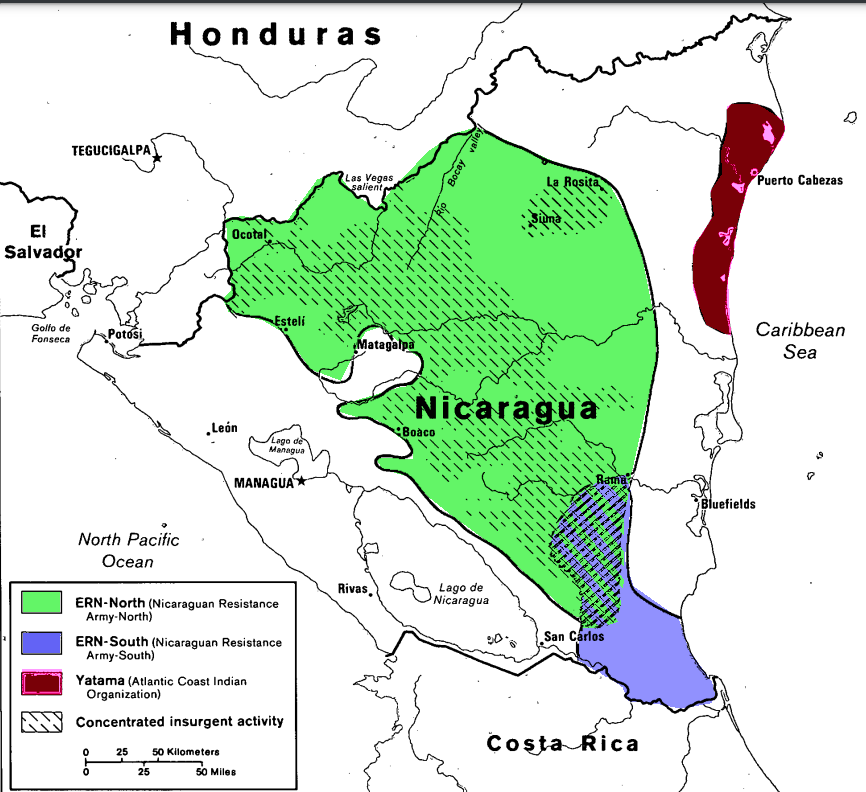
1988

== See also ==
- Anti-communism
- Central American Crisis
- CIA involvement in Contra cocaine trafficking
- Cold War
- Foreign interventions by the United States
- Latin America–United States relations
- Nicaraguan Revolution
- Psychological Operations in Guerrilla Warfare
- Reagan Doctrine
- Role of women in the Nicaraguan Revolution
- United States and state-sponsored terrorism
- United States involvement in regime change in Latin America

== Bibliography ==
- Asleson, Vern. (2004) Nicaragua: Those Passed By. Galde Press ISBN 1-931942-16-1
- Belli, Humberto. (1985). Breaking Faith: The Sandinista Revolution and Its Impact on Freedom and Christian Faith in Nicaragua. Crossway Books/The Puebla Institute.
- Bermudez, Enrique, "The Contras' Valley Forge: How I View the Nicaraguan Crisis", Policy Review, The Heritage Foundation, Summer 1988.
- Brody, Reed. (1985). Contra Terror in Nicaragua: Report of a Fact-Finding Mission: September 1984 – January 1985. Boston: South End Press. ISBN 0-89608-313-6.
- Brown, Timothy. (2001). The Real Contra War: Highlander Peasant Resistance in Nicaragua. University of Oklahoma Press. ISBN 0-8061-3252-3.
- Chamorro, Edgar. (1987). Packaging the Contras: A Case of CIA Disinformation. New York: Institute for Media Analysis. ISBN 0-941781-08-9; ISBN 0-941781-07-0.
- Christian, Shirley. (1986) Nicaragua, Revolution in the Family. New York: Vintage Books.
- Cox, Jack. (1987) Requiem in the Tropics: Inside Central America. UCA Books.
- Cruz S., Arturo J. (1989). Memoirs of a Counterrevolutionary. (1989). New York: Doubleday.
- Dickey, Christopher. (1985, 1987). With the Contras: A Reporter in the Wilds of Nicaragua. New York: Simon & Schuster.
- Garvin, Glenn. (1992). Everybody Had His Own Gringo: The CIA and the Contras. Washington: Brassey's.
- Gill, Terry D. (1989). Litigation strategy at the International Court: a case study of the Nicaragua v United States dispute. Dordrecht. ISBN 978-0-7923-0332-9.
- Gugliota, Guy. (1989). Kings of Cocaine Inside the Medellin Cartel. Simon and Schuster.
- Horton, Lynn. Peasants in Arms: War and Peace in the Mountains of Nicaragua, 1979–1994. (1998). Athens: Ohio University Center for International Studies.
- International Court of Justice (1986) "Military and Paramilitary Activities in and Against Nicaragua (Nicaragua v. United States Of America) – Summary of the Judgment of 27 June 1986". International Court of Justice. Archived from the original on 22 January 2009.
- International Court of Justice (IV) (1986) "Case concerning Military and Paramilitary Activities in and Against Nicaragua (Nicaragua v. United States of America), Vol. IV – pleadings, oral arguments, documents" (PDF). International Court of Justice. Archived from the original (PDF) on 2 December 2011.
- Hamilton, Lee H. et al. (1987) "Report of the Congressional Committees Investigating the Iran/Contra Affair"
- Johns, Michael "The Lessons of Afghanistan: Bipartisan Support for Freedom Fighters Pays Off", Policy Review, Spring 1987.
- Kirkpatrick, Jeane J. (1982) Dictatorships and Double Standards. Touchstone. ISBN 0-671-43836-0
- Miranda, Roger, and William Ratliff. (1993, 1994) The Civil War in Nicaragua: Inside the Sandinistas. New Brunswick, NY: Transaction Publishers.
- Moore, John Norton (1987). The Secret War in Central America: Sandinista Assault on World Order. University Publications of America.
- Pardo-Maurer, Rogelio. (1990) The Contras, 1980–1989: A Special Kind of Politics. New York: Praeger.
- Sklar, H. (1988) "Washington's war on Nicaragua" South End Press. ISBN 0-89608-295-4
