= Fifteenth of September Legion =

Anti-communist guerrilla group

The Fifteenth of September Legion (Legión Quince de Septiembre) was an anti-communist guerrilla group founded in Guatemala by exiled former junior officers of the defeated Nicaraguan National Guard, which was committed to overthrowing the Sandinista National Liberation Front government.

== History ==
Based in Guatemala City, it received some support from Guatemala's National Liberation Movement. Eduardo Román, manager of boxer Alexis Argüello, also convinced Argüello to fund a radio station, Radio 15th of September. To finance itself, the Legion also staged kidnappings for ransom and bank robberies, called "special operations", in Guatemala and El Salvador. Local leftist guerrillas were already financing themselves through these acts, and the Legion rightly figured that leftists would be blamed. Argentina also began providing assistance.

The Legion conducted its first major operation 13 December 1980. At the behest of the Argentine government, Legion commandos attacked Radio Noticias del Continente, a shortwave radio station in Grecia, Costa Rica that was sympathetic to the Montoneros and shared reports of government human rights abuses. They approached the radio station after midnight and attempted to burn it down using Molotov cocktails, but encountered unexpectedly heavy resistance. Unbeknownst to them, the radio station was heavily fortified and equipped with floodlights, defensive walls, and guard dogs. After losing one of their two jeeps to sabotage, they fled to their airstrip in Liberia and waited for a few days for an airlift, but it never arrived. They attempted to flee on a pickup truck but ran into a police blockade, whereupon they decided to surrender.

In August 1981, at the behest of the Argentine junta and the Reagan administration, it merged with the Nicaraguan Democratic Union (UDN) to form the Nicaraguan Democratic Force (FDN). The FDN would eventually grow to become the dominant Contra rebels' faction in the 1980s.

Former Legion head, Lieutenant-colonel Enrique Bermúdez, became the military commander of the FDN's military wing.

== See also ==
- Contras
- Nicaraguan revolution
- Somoza Family
- Sandinista Popular Army
- Mano Blanca
