= President of the Council of State of Nicaragua =

The President of the Council of State of Nicaragua was the presiding officer of Nicaragua's interim legislature.

Name	Period	Party
Bayardo Arce Castaño	May 1980 – 1981	Sandinista National Liberation Front
Carlos Núñez Téllez	1981 – 1984	Sandinista National Liberation Front

== Sources ==
- Carlos Nunez Tellez - Sandinista Leader, 39 - New York Times
