= Nicaraguan Resistance =

Nicaraguan Contra umbrella organization

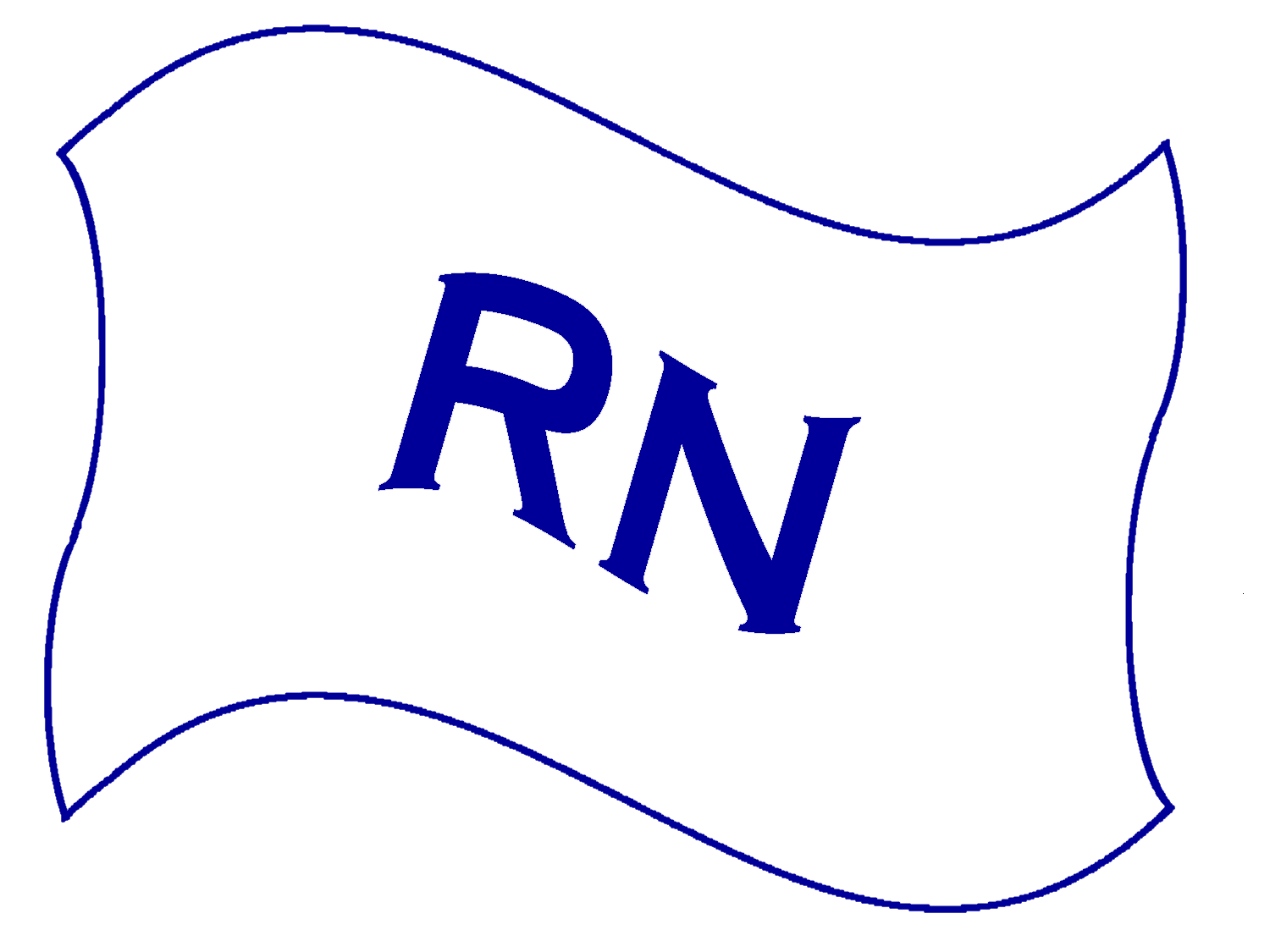
RN flag

The Nicaraguan Resistance (Resistencia Nicaragüense, RN) was the last and arguably most successful effort to unify Nicaragua's rebel Contras into a single umbrella organization. It was established in May 1987, after the United Nicaraguan Opposition (UNO) floundered.

The RN had a 54-member assembly that elected a seven-member directorate. Five seats were allotted to parties, one was elected at-large, and the last was reserved for YATAMA, the Miskito Indian organization. The initial members were Adolfo Calero (Conservative), Aristides Sánchez (Liberal), Alfonso Robelo (Social Democrat), Azucena Ferrey (Social Christian), Alfredo César Aguirre (Southern Opposition Bloc), and Pedro Joaquín Chamorro, Jr. (at-large). The YATAMA seat remained vacant. The Reagan administration supported the guerrilla warfare during the Nicaraguan Resistance in the 1980s with the possibility of it being a threat to the U.S with organizing a guerilla army the "contras".
