= Group of Twelve (Nicaragua) =

El Grupo de los Doce, or Group of Twelve, were a dozen members of the Nicaraguan establishment whose support for the Sandinista National Liberation Front (FSLN) against President Anastasio Somoza Debayle played a pivotal role in the acceptance of the Sandinistas by foreign and domestic opinion.

== Background ==
During the 1970s, debates over strategy split the FSLN, with the Terceristas advocating alliances with the middle and upper class against Somoza. They approached twelve figures from Nicaragua's establishment class, some already secretly Sandinistas, to sign a communiqué in support of the FSLN. On October 18, 1977, following a Tercerista offensive, they issued a manifesto from Costa Rica urging that the Sandinistas must be included in any political process. Their support lent respectability to the Sandinista cause and helped convince many that the rebels were no longer doctrinaire communists.

As Nicaragua moved into crisis following the assassination of Pedro Joaquín Chamorro Cardenal, the Carter administration pressured Somoza to allow the return of Los Doce. Upon their return on July 5, 1978, tens of thousands lined the streets to welcome them. Members would participate in the Broad Opposition Front (FAO) with other internal opponents of Somoza.

== Members ==
The twelve comprised:

- Sergio Ramírez Mercado - writer, FSLN member
- Arturo Cruz Porras - official at the Inter-American Development Bank
- Carlos Tūnnerman Bernheim - university rector
- Miguel D'Escoto Brockmann - Maryknoll priest, official at the World Council of Churches, secret Sandinista member
- Joaquín Cuadra Chamorro - prominent corporate lawyer, whose son, Joaquín Cuadra Lacayo, had joined the FSLN
- Felipe Mántica Abaunza - owner of a supermarket chain, left the group before Somoza's overthrow
- Ricardo Coronel Kautz - plantation owner, son of writer José Coronel Urtecho
- Fernando Cardenal Martínez - a Jesuit priest who, like his brother, Ernesto Cardenal, had secretly joined the FSLN
- Emilio Baltodano Pallais - businessman
- Ernesto Castillo Martínez - lawyer
- Carlos Gutiérrez Sotelo - dental surgeon
- Casimiro Sotelo Rodríguez - architect.
