= MILPAS =

Two different Nicaraquan paramilitaries

There were two armies with the acronym MILPAS in Nicaragua. The first, Milicias Populares Anti-Somocistas, fought alongside the Sandinista National Liberation Front against the regime of Anastasio Somoza Debayle. The second, Milicias Populares Anti-Sandinistas, was one of the earliest rebel groups that would form the contra movement.

== Anti-Somosa ==
Beginning in September 1978, the Frente Obrero and MAP-ML organized the Milicias Populares Anti-Somocistas. In rural areas, they fought in the north with Germán Pomares, "El Danto." They also played important roles in the liberation of Leon, Chinandega and other cities and towns, and in Managua they fought on the barricades put up in the working class barrios, taking part in the final destruction of the National Guard in its last stronghold. Among the hundreds of MILPAS fighters killed was Hernaldo Herrera Tellez, “Nano,” the general secretary of FO and a member of the national leadership of MAP-ML. MAP-ML and FO then dissolved the MILPAS they led on July 25,1979--several days after victory. Thereafter, MAP-ML and FO called upon the former Milicias Populares Anti-Somocistas fighters and others to support and join the Sandinista Popular Army and Militias as the contra war flared up against the new government, with many heeding their call.

== Anti-Sandinista ==
The earliest contras inside Nicaragua were the MILPAS (Milicias Populares Anti-Sandinistas), peasant militias led by disillusioned Sandinistas. Founded by Pedro Joaquín González, whose nom de guerre was "Dimas", the Contra Milpistas were also known as chilotes (green corn). Even after his death, other MILPAS bands sprouted during 1980–1981. The Milpistas were composed largely of the campesino highlanders and rural workers who would later form the rank and file of the rebellion.

This MILPAS assimilated into the Nicaraguan Democratic Force (FDN). By 1985, most of the FDN's regional commands were headed by MILPAS veterans. By late 1987, the ranks of ex-MILPAS regional commanders included:

Encarnación Valdivia (Baldivia) Chavarria, "Tigrillo"	Rafaela Herrera Regional Command
Francisco Valdivia (Baldivia) Chavarria, "Dimas Tigrillo"	Andrés Castro Regional Command
José Danilo Galeano Rodas, "Tiro Al Blanco"	Juan Castro Castro Regional Command
Abelardo Zelaya Chavarria, "Ivan"	Alonso Irias Regional Command
Oscar Manuel Sobalvarro García, "Rubén"	Salvador Perez Regional Command
Anroyce "Rudy" Zelaya Zeledon, "Douglas"	Pedro Joaquín González Regional Command
Justo Pastor Meza Aguilar, "Denis"	Santiago Meza Regional Command
Fremio Isabel Altamirano Montenegro, "Jimmy Leo" ("Jimileo")	Larry McDonald Regional Command
Tirso (Tirzo) Ramón Moreno Aguilar, "Rigoberto"	Jorge Salazar I Regional Command
Israel Galeano Cornejo, "Franklin" ("Franklyn")	Jorge Salazar II Regional Command
Diógenes Hernández Membreño, "Fernando"	Jorge Salazar III Regional Command
Antonio Chavarria Rodríguez, "Dumas"	Jorge Salazar V Regional Command
Luis Adán Fley González, "Jhonson"	15 September Regional Command
Freddy Montenegro Gadea Zeledon, "Coral"	Quilalí Regional Command
