= Adolfo Calero =

Nicaraguan politician (1931–2012)

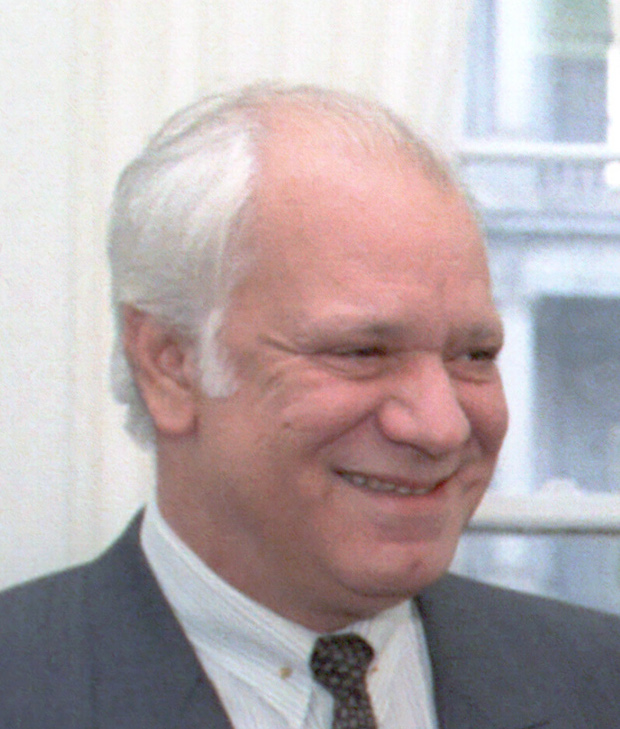
Calero in 1985

Adolfo Calero Portocarrero (December 22, 1931 – June 2, 2012) was a Nicaraguan businessman and the leader of the Nicaraguan Democratic Force, the largest rebel group of the Contras, opposing the Sandinista government.

Calero was responsible for managing the bank accounts into which money was deposited and then used to buy supplies and arms for the Contras. He was brought to testify at hearings of the U.S. Congress in May 1987.

== Early life and education ==
Calero was born on December 22, 1931, in Managua, to Adolfo Calero Orozco (1899–1980) and María Portocarrero (1911–1944), who had married in 1927. The oldest of four children, he attended the University of Notre Dame in South Bend, Indiana, where he graduated in 1953, and Syracuse University in Syracuse, New York. In Managua, he managed the Coca-Cola bottling plant.

== Career ==
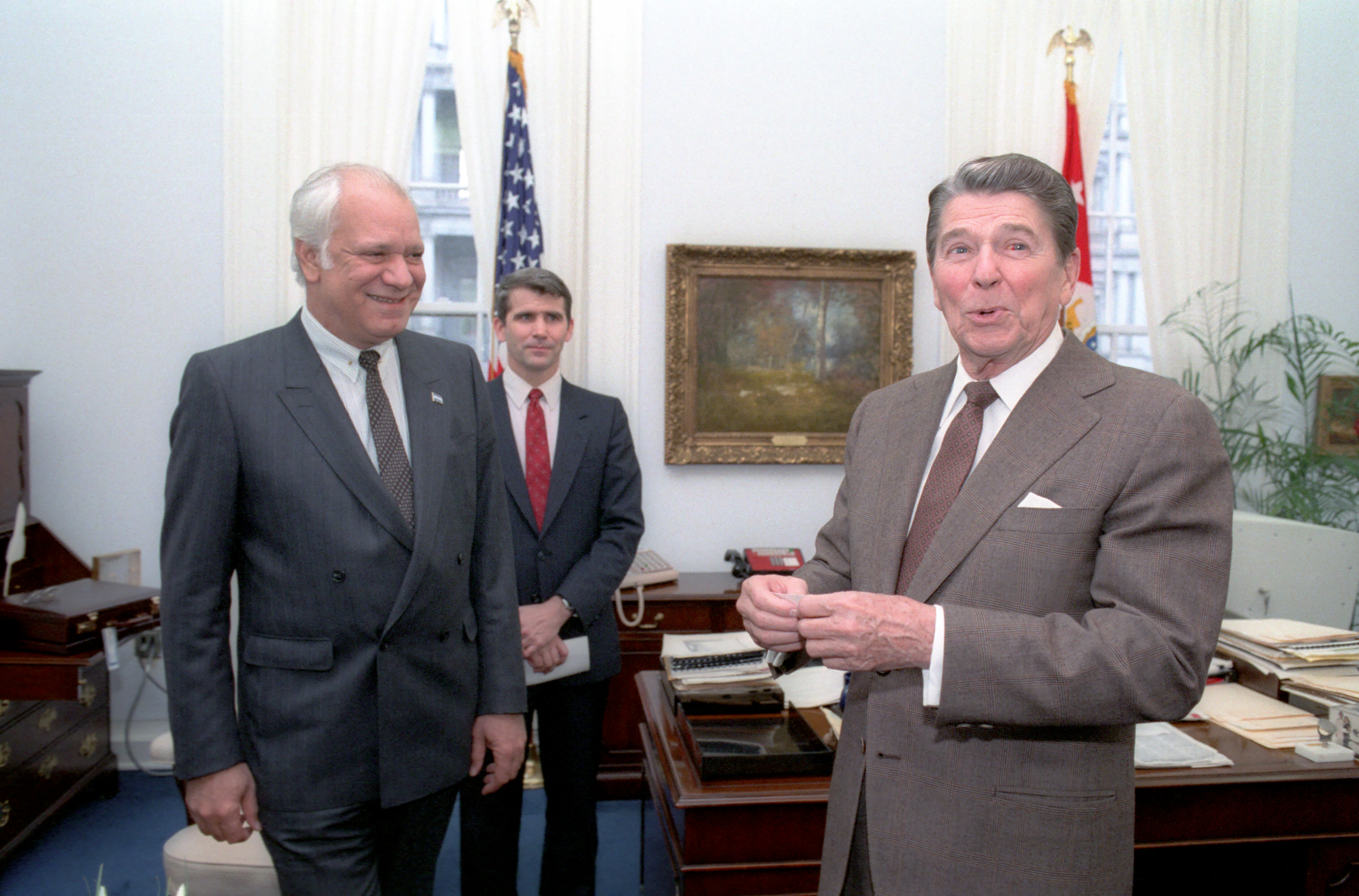
Calero with then U.S. President Ronald Reagan and (in background) Oliver North at the White House in April 1985

Calero was associated with the Conservative Party of Nicaragua. Before the 1979 overthrow of the government of Anastasio Somoza, he was imprisoned under the Somoza government, which gave credibility to his claim to have opposed both Somoza and the Sandinistas.

=== Nicaraguan Contras ===
In early 1983, he joined the political directorate of the Nicaraguan Democratic Force (FDN). By October he became its president, but many observers wondered about his real power because of the political wing's weak control over the military wing. In a bid to unify contra factions and win aid from the US Congress, he became a member of the United Nicaraguan Opposition (UNO) triumvirate with Alfonso Robelo and Arturo Cruz.

Calero controlled the FDN through his deputy, Aristides Sánchez, and the Contras' military commander, Enrique Bermúdez, an alliance so tight that it was dubbed the "Iron Triangle."

However, there were tensions below the surface. After the Sapoa ceasefire, Calero exploited discontent with Bermudez among the FDN's field commanders in an effort to push him out. Heavy-handed intervention by the CIA helped to crush that effort. Later, however, other commanders, with the blessing of the US State Department, ousted both their political and military leadership.

On July 26, 2011, he published his book, Cronicas de un Contra, which narrates his participation during the 1980s in Nicaragua.

== Personal life ==
Calero married Maria Ernestina Lacayo on December 7, 1957. The couple had two children, Myriam (b. 1958) and Adolfo (1960–1994). Calero has three grandchildren. He had three younger siblings: Myriam (1933–2018) Mario (1935–1993) and Martha (b. 1943).

== Death ==
Calero died in Managua, on June 2, 2012, from complications from pneumonia and kidney failure. He was survived by his wife, daughter, three grandchildren, and two sisters.

== In popular culture ==
In the 2017 film American Made, Calero is portrayed by Daniel Lugo.
