= Enrique Bermúdez =

Nicaraguan Contra leader (1932–1991)

- Born: December 11, 1932; León, Nicaragua
- Died: February 16, 1991 (aged 58); Managua, Nicaragua
- Cause of death: Assassination by gunshot
- Spouse: Elsa Italia Mejía
- Children: 4
- Military career
- Allegiance: Nicaragua
- Branch: (Nicaragua) National Guard (Nicaragua) Contras
- Service years: 1952–1979
- Rank: Lieutenant colonel
- Nickname: Comandante 380
- Commands: Fifteenth of September Legion and Nicaraguan Democratic Force
- Conflicts: Contra Insurgency

Enrique Bermúdez Varela (December 11, 1932 – February 16, 1991), known as Comandante 380, was a Nicaraguan soldier and rebel who founded and commanded the Nicaraguan Contras. In this capacity, he became a central global figure in one of the most prominent conflicts of the Cold War.

In 1981, Bermúdez founded the largest Contra army, which waged a major war against Nicaragua's Sandinista government; in the war, the Contras received overt and covert assistance from the U.S. government, and the Sandinistas were supported by the Soviet Union and Cuba.

After founding the Contra army in 1981, Bermudez served as its top military commander through the end of the military conflict in 1990. He maintained responsibility for all of Contra military operations, and later helped lead the Contras' transition to an opposition political party in the early 1990s after the Sandinistas were ultimately defeated by political opponents in the 1990 Nicaraguan general election, the second national election following the Sandinistas' rise to power in the Nicaraguan Revolution of 1979.

In the first election, held in 1984, Bermudez and other opponents alleged that Daniel Ortega and the Sandinistas won the election fraudulently, and Bermudez and the Contras refused to recognize the government and instead escalated their war against it until Ortega and the Sandinistas were later ousted in the 1990 elections.

On February 16, 1991, Bermudez was assassinated in Managua. His family and closest supporters alleged that the assassination was coordinated and conducted by the Sandinistas, but the perpetuators of his killing were never identified and his murder remains unsolved.

== Early life and education ==
Bermúdez was born on 11 December 1932, in León, Nicaragua, the son of a mechanical engineer and a domestic servant. He attended Academia Militar de Nicaragua (AMN), Nicaragua's primary military academy, where he graduated in 1952.

== Military and political career ==
=== Nicaraguan National Guard ===
After graduating from the military academy, Bermudez joined Nicaragua's National Guard, where he served in its engineering corps. He rose to the rank of Lieutenant colonel under former Nicaraguan President Anastasio Somoza Debayle. In 1979, Bermudez was serving as Nicaragua's military attaché to the U.S. in Washington, D.C. when the Somoza government was ousted by the Sandinistas in the Nicaraguan Revolution.

=== Contra war ===
Following the Sandinista Revolution, Bermúdez quickly emerged as one of the most influential opponents of the Sandinista government. He and Ricardo Lau co-founded the Fifteenth of September Legion in Guatemala City, the first armed opposition movement against the Sandinista government. In 1981, then in exile in Miami, Bermúdez returned to Tegucigalpa, Honduras, where he became military commander of the Nicaraguan Democratic Force (FDN), the largest and most influential Contra organization.

During the Contra war, Bermúdez was known by his nom de guerre, Comandante 380.

The Contras' guerrilla war against the Sandinista government ultimately became one of the most contentious and prominent Cold War conflicts, with the U.S. government supporting the Contras with overt and covert military assistance, and the Soviet Union, Cuba, East Germany, and other Eastern Bloc nations supporting the Sandinista government.

The Contras ultimately became a major recipient of support under the Reagan Doctrine, under which the U.S. believed it could drive the Soviet Union out of Central America and other regions around the world. As U.S. arms and support began flowing to Bermúdez and the Contras, their war against the Sandinista government escalated throughout the 1980s. In 1990, however, the Sandinista government was defeated in the 1990 Nicaraguan general election, and Bermudez helped lead the Contras' transition into a political and governing entity.

== Criticisms ==
Assessments of Bermúdez's military and political leadership are varied. His supporters believe that he provided stability among the fractious rebels, holding the FDN together while other Contra factions splintered. Critics, however, charge that he failed to provide strategic direction for the FDN's campaigns, and that he hampered the Contras' effectiveness by rewarding loyal cronies and ex-Guardsmen instead of the FDN's most capable commanders. Discontent finally led a council of FDN field commanders to oust Bermúdez and purge the Contras' predominantly Miami-based political leadership. Following Bermudez' assassination in 1991, the Sandinista government and members of the council were both considered leading suspects in his murder, which remains unsolved.

Critics of the Contras also alleged that Bermúdez was one of several figures who had been engaged in cocaine and other drug-running as a Contra commander.

=== Relations with U.S. ===
Bermúdez was the key military leader behind the Contras' war. He also was a key contact for the Reagan administration, who saw Bermudez and Adolfo Calero as their primary contacts within the Contra leadership. Votes on U.S. aid to the Contras were some of the most contentious and close votes in the United States Congress during the 1980s, but the predominant sentiment in Congress was that continued aid to the Contras was critical both to establishing a non-communist government in Nicaragua and driving the Soviet Union from the American hemisphere during the height of the Cold War.

== Autobiography: The Contras' Valley Forge ==
In the Summer 1988 issue of Policy Review magazine, Bermúdez told the most comprehensive account of his life, a lengthy autobiographical essay titled "The Contras' Valley Forge: How I View the Nicaraguan Crisis", in which the Contra leader chronicled his life from his early career as a military attaché to Somoza through the height of the conflict between the Contras and Sandinista government.

In the article, Bermúdez staunchly criticized the Sandinistas for their alliances with the Soviet Union and Cuba and for betraying promises they made to establish a representative democracy. However, Bermúdez also issued some criticism at U.S. policy, writing that some Democrats, such as Jim Wright, then the Speaker of the United States House of Representatives, were appeasing the Sandinista regime in ways that were inhibiting the Contras' in their effort to overthrow the Sandinista government. The article was authored by conservative author and writer (and then Policy Review editor) Michael Johns, who interviewed Bermúdez over a series of days in Tegucigalpa, Honduras in May and June 1988.

== Personal life ==
Bermudez was married to Elsa Italia Mejía with whom he had four children.

In the last years of the Contra War, Bermúdez took up reading the works of libertarian author Ayn Rand. While serving as commander of the semi-secret Contra headquarters on the Nicaragua-Honduras border code named "Aguacate," Spanish for Avocado, he was known to take solitary walks in the nearby jungle, where he photographed intricate spiderwebs.

In 2002 and 2004, his daughter, Claudia Bermúdez, now a resident of the San Francisco area, ran unsuccessfully against incumbent Democrat Barbara Lee for California's 9th congressional district seat. She remains heavily engaged in public policy-related initiatives in the district.

== Assassination ==
Following the Sandinista defeat in the 1990 Nicaraguan general election, Bermúdez returned to Managua. On February 16, 1991, he was lured to a meeting at the InterContinental Hotel in Managua, which proved to be an assassination ambush. Bermudez was shot in the hotel's parking lot as he departed the InterContinental after those he was scheduled to meet did not arrive. In 1994, Bermúdez' daughter, Claudia Bermúdez, told the Miami Herald that, "there were a lot of people who would have benefited from having my dad put away--the Sandinistas, the Chamorro government, the United States. My dad died with a lot of information."

A funeral mass for Bermúdez in Miami was attended by many of his U.S. and Nicaraguan supporters. He is buried in Miami and survived by a number of family members, who mostly live in Miami.

== See also ==
- List of unsolved murders (1980–1999)
- National Guard (Nicaragua)
- Nicaraguan Revolution
- Sandinista Popular Army
