= Democratic Revolutionary Alliance =

Nicaraguan rebel group

The Democratic Revolutionary Alliance (Spanish: Alianza Revolucionaria Democrática or ARDE) were the Southern Front guerrillas in Nicaragua that fought against the Marxist–Leninist elements of the original Sandinista that took part in the Nicaraguan Revolution of 1979. Despite being one of the Contra forces, they maintained an ideological distance from the U.S.-backed Nicaraguan Democratic Force (Contras).

== Formation ==
Formed by Edén Pastora Gómez in 1982, it united his Sandino Revolutionary Front (FRS) with such groups as the Nicaraguan Democratic Movement (MDN), MISURASATA and FARN. A.R.D.E. quickly gained momentum in the southeast of Nicaragua. The San Juan River was "liberated" by ARDE, and five strategic bases were formed, including Sarapiquí and La Penca.

== Activities in the 1980s ==
As ARDE's regional field commanders penetrated deeper and deeper into Nicaragua they became increasingly frustrated at the squandering of resources, the inter-factional strife, and Pastora's erratic directives. In 1985, other rebel groups, including former ARDE political head Alfonso Robelo, formed the United Nicaraguan Opposition umbrella group. Fernando "El Negro" Chamorro of the UNO-aligned FARN sought to win over ARDE commanders, and in November, ARDE units encountered Nicaraguan Democratic Force (FDN) elements moving down from the north.

Six southern front regional commanders led by Navegante (Nueva Guinea), Ganso (El Rama), and Leonel (Chontales) deposed Comandante Cero in early 1986 and forged battlefield alliances with their other guerrillas from the FDN such as Franklyn and Apache. This led to both their greatest battlefield successes and a renewal of American aid.

== Current activities ==
After the 1990 elections, the Sandinistas were relegated to secondary status. The Southern Front Contras continue their fight, and as of 2004 finally gained title to viable farmland in the vicinity of El Rama.
