= United Nicaraguan Opposition =

The United Nicaraguan Opposition (Unidad Nicaragüense Opositora, UNO) was a Nicaraguan rebel umbrella group formed in 1985, led by the triumvirate of Adolfo Calero, Alfonso Robelo, and Arturo Cruz. However, the great majority of UNO's military forces came from Calero's Nicaraguan Democratic Force (FDN), and throughout its two-year existence Robelo and Cruz complained that Calero treated them as figureheads rather than equals. Generally, the CIA backed Calero in these struggles, while Elliott Abrams and the State Department backed Robelo and Cruz.

In January 1987, Cruz informed Abrams of his intention to resign. In a bid to prevent this, Abrams pushed Calero into resigning in mid-February, but Cruz left on March 9. With Cruz's resignation, UNO collapsed. It was succeeded by the Nicaraguan Resistance.
