= Nicaraguan Democratic Force =

Nicaraguan Contra group

The Nicaraguan Democratic Force (Fuerza Democrática Nicaragüense, or FDN) was one of the earliest Contra groups, formed on August 11, 1981, in Guatemala City. It was formed to oppose Nicaragua's revolutionary Sandinista government following the 1979 overthrow of Anastasio Somoza Debayle. It merged the 15th of September Legion, which comprised mostly former members of Somoza's National Guard, with the Nicaraguan Democratic Union, an organization of émigrés from the business and professional classes. The new FDN also began assimilating the MILPAS movement, bands led by disenchanted former MAP-ML guerrillas. The FDN military was under the command of former National Guard colonel Enrique Bermúdez.

The FDN was heavily backed by the Central Intelligence Agency and the Reagan administration. The FDN was also alleged to be engaged in drug trafficking in order to finance its war against the Sandinista government.

== Commanders ==
The FDN's most notable commanders included:

- Suicida – Pedro Pablo Ortiz Centeno. Former Guard sergeant, operated in the Jalapa area. Legendary for his eagerness for battle, but never fully adjusted from conventional to guerrilla warfare. Went into virtual mutiny in the fall of 1983, and was executed for committing atrocities.
- Franklin [Franklyn] – Israel Galeano Cornejo. Regional commander of Jorge Salazar II, considered perhaps the FDN's best commander. Supporter of Tigrillo's pre-FDN band. Helped to lead the late 1989 ouster of Bermúdez and the political leadership. Forged alliances with brother Commandos from ARDE Frente Sur leading to significant battlefield victories. Died in a suspicious automobile accident in 1992 in Northern Nicaragua.
- Toño – Walter Saúl Calderón López. Former Guard lieutenant, first commander of the Jorge Salazar, later led the Tactical Operations Command. Expelled after supporting a bid to oust Enrique Bermúdez in 1988.
- Mike Lima – Luis Alfonso Moreno Payan. Ex-Guard lieutenant, commander of the Diriangén. Known for the capture of Pantasma in 1983. Left field command for staff duties after crippling wounds.
- Tigrillo – Encarnación Valdivia [Baldivia] Chavarría. Ex-Sandinista, already leading a ragged MILPAS guerrilla band before joining the FDN. Commander of the Rafaela Herrera, roaming Jinotega Department. A charismatic leader, credited with recruiting thousands into the FDN. Chronically resentful of Bermúdez's favoritism for ex-Guardsmen, he backed the 1988 mutiny.
- Mack – José Benito Bravo Centeno. Former Guardsman, commander of the Nicarao Regional Commando, operating in the Ocotal area. Gained a reputation for abuses, coupled with a lukewarm will to fight.
- Rubén – Oscar Manuel Sobalvarro García. Surviving member of the MILPAS movement. Originally took the nom de guerre "Culebra" (Snake), but changed it due to the CIA's public relations concerns. Led the Salvador Perez Regional Commando in lower Jinotega, and became head of the council of field commanders following the late 1989 reorganization.
- Jhonson – Luis Adán Fley González. Former Sandinista and early member of Tigrillo's band. After serving in the Special Operations Command, he founded the 15th of September Regional Commando, in Matagalpa Department's Pancasán region.
- Quiché – Juan Ramón Rivas Romero. Former Guard sergeant, Toño's deputy commander in Task Force Jorge Salazar. He assumed command after Toño left, leading it as it grew into the FDN's largest force, with five regional commandos. In 1988, Bermúdez selected him to become chief of staff.
- Rigoberto – Tirso Ramón Moreno Aguilar. Cattle merchant from Jinotega, and member of Dimas' MILPAS band. Regional commander of Jorge Salazar I, expelled for supporting the anti-Bermúdez movement in 1988.
- Moisés – José Efrén Martínez Mondragón. Guard sergeant who led the FDN's first major strike, the demolition of the Somotillo bridge on March 14, 1982. Made task force commander of the José Dolores Estrada. In 1985, Mondragón sought exile in Mexico, where he was sent back to Nicaragua. Under duress, he urged his former comrades to accept amnesty, but was arrested and murdered in March 1988 after making overtures to return to the rebels.
- Fernando – Diógenes Hernández Membreño. Regional commander of Jorge Salazar III; an evangelical pastor who joined the rebels due to Sandinista persecution of his congregation. After being promoted to the general staff, he became disenchanted with Bermúdez, and was ousted after participating in the 1988 mutiny.
