= 2020s in North American history =

The political history of North America in the 2020s covers political events on the continent, other than elections, from 2020 onwards.

== International events in North America ==
=== Pink tide ===
Map of Latin America depicting the ruling party of each country by São Paulo Forum affiliation. Red depicts member parties (left-wing) and blue depicts non-member parties (right-wing) in 2011 (left), 2018 (center), and 2026 (right).

The pink tide (Spanish: marea rosa; Portuguese: onda rosa), or the turn to the left (Spanish: giro a la izquierda; Portuguese: virada à esquerda), was a political wave and turn towards left-wing governments in Latin America throughout the 21st century. As a term, both phrases are used in political analysis in the news media and elsewhere to refer to a move toward more economically progressive or socially progressive policies in the region. Such governments have been referred to as "left-of-centre", "left-leaning", and "radical social-democratic". They are also members of the São Paulo Forum, a conference of left-wing political parties and other organizations from the Americas.

The Latin American countries viewed as part of this ideological trend have been referred to as pink tide nations, with the term post-neoliberalism or socialism of the 21st century also being used to describe the movement. Elements of the movement have included a rejection of the Washington Consensus. At the same time, some pink tide governments, such as those of Argentina, Brazil, and Venezuela, have been varyingly characterized as being anti-American, prone to populism, as well as authoritarian, particularly in the case of Nicaragua and Venezuela by the 2010s, although many others remained democratic.

The pink tide was followed by the conservative wave, a political phenomenon that emerged in the early 2010s as a direct reaction to the pink tide. Some authors have proposed that there are multiple distinct pink tides rather than a single one, with the first pink tide happening during the late 1990s and early 2000s and a second pink tide encompassing the elections of the late 2010s to early 2020s. A resurgence of the pink tide was kicked off by Mexico in 2018 and Argentina in 2019 and further established by Bolivia in 2020, along with Peru, Honduras, and Chile in 2021, and then Colombia and Brazil in 2022, with Colombia electing the first left-wing president in their history. In 2023, centre-left Bernardo Arévalo secured a surprise victory in Guatemala. In 2024, Claudia Sheinbaum won the Mexican presidency in a landslide, a continuation of Andrés Manuel López Obrador's left-wing government, and Yamandú Orsi's victory in Uruguay marked a return to power for the Broad Front.

However, during the mid-2020s the second pink tide has been dissipating, with countries such as Argentina, Bolivia, Chile, Colombia, Honduras, Panama, and Peru electing right-leaning governments, leading to some believing a "second conservative wave" is now ongoing. The new trend was cemented by the strikes on Venezuela and the capture of president Nicolás Maduro in early January 2026, along with threats from US president Donald Trump towards the then Colombian president Gustavo Petro.

== History by country ==
=== Barbados ===
The government of Barbados announced in September 2020 that it would transition to a republic during the next year. In 2021, an indirect presidential election was held to choose the first ever President of Barbados. The outgoing Governor-General of Barbados, Dame Sandra Mason, was the only candidate nominated; Mason was sworn in on 30 November, the 55th anniversary of Barbadian independence from the United Kingdom.

=== Cuba ===
At the 8th Congress of the Communist Party, Raúl Castro officially resigned as the First Secretary, the most powerful position in Cuba. Cuban President Miguel Díaz-Canel was officially named First Secretary of the Communist Party following the resignation of Raúl Castro. He is the first person not of the Castro family to hold the position since the 1959 Cuban revolution.

A series of protests against the Cuban government and the ruling Communist Party of Cuba began on 11 July 2021, triggered by the shortage of food and medicine and the government's response to the resurgent COVID-19 pandemic in Cuba. The protests have been described as the largest anti-government demonstrations since the Maleconazo in 1994.

=== Dominican Republic ===
In March 2020 massive protests occurred in the Dominican Republic, due to announced postponement of national elections.

=== El Salvador ===
in the 2020 Salvadoran political crisis on 9 February 2020, the Salvadoran President Nayib Bukele ordered 1,400 Salvadoran soldiers from the Salvadoran Army to enter the Legislative Assembly of El Salvador to coerce the approval of a loan request of 109 million dollars from the United States for Bukele's security plan for El Salvador. After winning a majority in the 2021 Salvadoran legislative election, President Bukele's party Nuevas Ideas voted to sack the country's Attorney General and the five judges of the Constitutional Court.

=== Guatemala ===
Alejandro Giammattei became the new president in 2020. Later in the year, the 2020 Guatemalan protests breakout in response to COVID-19 pandemic and Hurricanes Eta and Iota.

=== Haiti ===
The 2021 Haitian protests were a mass protest movement consisting of popular movement and opposition mass street demonstrations and violent protest marches across Haiti that began on 14 January in protest at president Jovenel Moïse's plan to run for one more year in power. The protests and civil unrest that paralysed Haiti hit hard. Since the 14 January protest, hundreds of thousands took part in weekly protests calling for the government to resign.

President Moïse said he foiled a coup attempt to kill him and overthrow the government in February 2021; at least 23 people were arrested. He was assassinated on 7 July 2021 at 1 a.m. EDT (UTC−04:00) when a group of 28 gunmen stormed his residence and opened fire. First Lady Martine Moïse was also shot multiple times in the attack. Joseph Lambert, the President of the Senate, was nominated as provisional President of Haiti by a group of senators, potentially succeeding Jovenel Moïse. Following the assassination, Ariel Henry assumed the office of acting prime minister on 20 July.

In September 2022 Henry announced that the government would be ending fuel subsidies and that the price of petroleum products would be increasing; this led to protests, including a demonstration in Port-au-Prince that escalated to a riot days later. In response to the government, a federation of over a dozen gangs blockaded the country's largest fuel terminal. This blockade and the surrounding unrest has led to the temporary closure of foreign embassies in Haiti, as well as resource shortages, hospital service reductions, school closures, and workers being unable to commute to work.

In 2023 the situation in Haiti continued to spiral downhill, with the last democratically elected officials leaving office, leaving Haiti without an elected government. As of September 2023, reports indicated that approximately 80% of the Haitan capital was under the control of gangs. On 11 October 2022, Henry and his cabinet requested the deployment of foreign troops to oppose the gangs and anti-government demonstrations in Port-au-Prince. On 15 October, the United States and Mexico sent armored vehicles and military equipment to aid the Haitian government. On 21 October, the UN Security Council voted unanimously to approve sanctions on Haiti, namely an asset freeze, travel ban and arms embargo aimed at the country's armed gangs.

On 4 March armed gangs attacked the heavily fortified Toussaint Louverture International Airport, exchanging gunfire with police and the Haitian Armed Forces in an attempt to take control of the facility after rumors that Henry would return to the country, fueling speculation that an alliance between rival gangs was forming to overthrow the Haitian government. Other gang leaders, including Guy Philippe, reportedly will try to take over the presidency of Haiti. With the Port-au-Prince airport shut down due to gang violence, on 5 March, Henry's chartered plane was prevented from landing in Santo Domingo and landed instead in San Juan, Puerto Rico. On 12 March 2024 Ariel Henry announced that he would resign.

=== Honduras ===
In 2021, a former cartel leader testified in a New York City court that he had bribed President Juan Orlando Hernández with 250,000 US dollars to prevent extradition to the United States. His brother Tony Hernández was sentenced to life in prison on allegations of drug trafficking, with court documents claiming that the two had conspired to engage in "state-sponsored drug trafficking".

The leftist Xiomara Castro became in 2021 the country's first female president, as well as the first president not to be a member of either the Liberal Party or the National Party since democracy was restored in 1982.

=== Mexico ===
As the Fourth Transformation enters its second year, President Andrés Manuel López Obrador (AMLO) faces challenges involving social violence (particularly drug-related and other killings), corruption, major infrastructure development, universal health care, and decentralization of the government. At a news conference on 15 January 2020, journalist Jorge Ramos pointed that during AMLO's first year as president, there were more homicides than under his predecessors; Ramos asked if a change in strategy and/or personal were required. The president assured him that we would see results by December.

Following several notorious cases of femicide, violence against women emerges as a priority concern. Hundreds of thousands march on 8 March and millions of women strike on 9 March, 2020.

Andrés Manuel López Obrador (Spanish: [anˈdɾes maˈnwel ˈlopes oβɾaˈðoɾ]; born 13 November 1953), also known by his initials AMLO, is a Mexican former politician, political scientist, and writer who served as the 65th president of Mexico from 2018 to 2024 and he also served as Head of Government of Mexico City from 2000 to 2005.

Born in Tepetitán, in the municipality of Macuspana, in the south-eastern state of Tabasco, López Obrador earned a degree in political science from the National Autonomous University of Mexico following a hiatus from his studies to participate in politics. He began his political career in 1976 as a member of the Institutional Revolutionary Party (PRI). His first public position was as director of the Indigenous Institute of Tabasco, where he promoted the addition of books in indigenous languages. In 1989, he joined the Party of the Democratic Revolution (PRD), becoming the party's 1994 candidate for Governor of Tabasco and national leader between 1996 and 1999. In 2000, he was elected Head of Government of Mexico City. During his tenure, his crime, infrastructure, and social spending policies made him a popular figure on the Mexican left. In 2004, his state immunity from prosecution was removed after he refused to cease construction on land allegedly expropriated by his predecessor, Rosario Robles. This legal process lasted a year, ending with López Obrador maintaining his right to run for office.

López Obrador was nominated as the presidential candidate for the Coalition for the Good of All during the 2006 elections, where he was narrowly defeated by the National Action Party (PAN) candidate Felipe Calderón. While the Federal Electoral Tribunal noted some irregularities, it denied López Obrador's request for a general recount, which sparked protests nationwide. In 2011, he founded the National Regeneration Movement (Morena), a civil association. He was a candidate for the Progressive Movement coalition in the 2012 elections, won by the Commitment to Mexico coalition candidate Enrique Peña Nieto. In 2012, he left the PRD after protesting the party's signing of the Pact for Mexico and prior to helping Morena to become a political party. As part of the Juntos Haremos Historia coalition, López Obrador was elected president after a landslide victory in the 2018 general election.

Described as being center-left, progressive, a left-wing populist, social democratic, and an economic nationalist, López Obrador was a national politician for over three decades. During his presidency, he promoted public investment in sectors that had been liberalized under previous administrations and implemented several progressive social reforms. Supporters praised him for promoting institutional renewal after decades of high inequality and corruption and refocusing the country's neoliberal consensus towards improving the state of the working class. Conversely, López Obrador has been criticized for contributing to democratic backsliding, failing to adequately respond to the COVID-19 pandemic, and attempting to appease drug cartels. He left office in September 2024, succeeded by his chosen successor Claudia Sheinbaum, and retired from both electoral politics and public life.

=== Nicaragua ===
In May 2021, Nicaragua's Supreme Electoral Council revoked the legal status of opposition party the Democratic Restoration Party (PRD). The same week, the Ortega government opened an investigation into Cristiana Chamorro, alleging money laundering, which threatened to disqualify her candidacy as people under investigation are barred from running. The same day, the police also raided the news offices of her brother Carlos's media channel, Confidencial. On 5 June, the Ortega administration arrested Arturo Cruz. On 8 June, the government arrested Félix Maradiaga, a leader of the Blue and White National Unity (UNAB) opposition group. Later the same day they arrested economist Juan Sebastián Chamorro, the fourth pre-candidate to be detained. On 20 June, the government arrested Miguel Mora, a pre-candidate affiliated with the PRD until the government revoked its charter. Peasant leader Medardo Mairena was also arrested on the night of 5 July 2021, On 9 July, law professor and Civic Alliance attorney María Asunción Moreno announced her intention to register as a pre-candidate with the CxL. The following day, she received a summons from the government, and, following information that she would be arrested, went into hiding and later into exile. On 12 July, Luis Fley confirmed he had gone into exile in response to "threats from the dictatorship to arrest me". Later on 24 July, the government announced the investigation and then the arrest of ACxL conservative pre-candidate Noel Vidaurre, Most of those already arrested are accused of violations of Law 1055, "performing acts that undermine independence, sovereignty, and self-determination".

On 15 June, the Permanent Council of the Organization of American States put out a statement saying it "unequivocally condemns the arrest, harassment and arbitrary restriction imposed on potential presidential candidates, political parties and independent media outlets" and called for "the immediate release of potential candidates and all political prisoners." A large majority of member states (26) endorsed the statement; Following Mora's arrest, Mexico and Argentina jointly recalled their ambassadors from Nicaragua for consultation, citing "the worrying political-legal actions carried out by the Nicaraguan government in recent days that have put at risk the integrity and freedom of various opposition figures (including presidential candidates), Nicaraguan activists and businessmen".

=== United States ===
The impeachment trial of Donald Trump found him not guilty in February 2020. The 2020 Democratic Party presidential primaries ended up supporting moderate Joe Biden (former Vice President to Barack Obama) as the party's nominee, over more progressive choices such as Bernie Sanders or Elizabeth Warren. The presidential campaign was dominated by the issues of the COVID-19 pandemic and the resulting economic fallout. A month before the election, Supreme Court Justice Ruth Bader Ginsburg died unexpectedly, leading to the nomination and confirmation of Amy Coney Barrett as her replacement by the sitting President Trump and the Republican-held Senate. The election ended with Biden winning. Trump made numerous false allegations of election fraud and attempted to overturn the election results, but this failed.

==== George Floyd protests ====
The George Floyd protests are an ongoing series of protests, lootings, riots, and demonstrations against police brutality and racism in policing. The protests began in the United States in Minneapolis on 26 May 2020, after George Floyd, a 46-year-old black man, was murdered by Derek Chauvin, a white police officer. Chauvin knelt on Floyd's neck for almost nine minutes during an arrest the previous day.

The unrest began as local protests in the Minneapolis–Saint Paul metropolitan area of Minnesota before quickly spreading across the entire nation as well as George Floyd protests outside the United States in support of Black Lives Matter. While the majority of protests have been peaceful, demonstrations in some cities descended into riots and widespread looting, with some being marked by street skirmishes and strong police reaction, notably against some peaceful protesters and members of the media. At least 200 cities imposed curfews by 3 June, while at least 27 states and Washington, D.C, activated over 74,000 National Guard personnel due to the mass unrest. From the beginning of the protests to 3 June, at least 11,000 people had been arrested, including all four police officers who were present while Floyd was murdered.

==== 2020 elections and aftermath ====
After Democratic nominee Joe Biden won the 2020 United States presidential election, Republican nominee and then-incumbent president Donald Trump pursued an unprecedented effort to overturn the election, (Note: Attributed to multiple references:) with support from his campaign, proxies, political allies, and many of his supporters. These efforts culminated in the January 6 Capitol attack, described by multiple sources as a self-coup d'état attempt. Trump and his allies used the "big lie" propaganda technique to promote false claims and conspiracy theories asserting that the election was stolen by means of rigged voting machines, electoral fraud and an international conspiracy. (Note: Attributed to multiple references:) Trump pressed Department of Justice leaders to challenge the results and publicly state the election was corrupt. The attorney general, director of national intelligence, director of the cybersecurity and infrastructure security agency, state and federal judges, election officials, and state governors dismissed these claims at the time.

Trump loyalists attempted to keep him in power; at the state level, they targeted legislatures with the intent of changing the results or delaying electoral vote certification at the Capitol; nationally, they promoted the idea Vice President Mike Pence could refuse to certify the results on January 6, 2021. Pence repeatedly stated the Vice President has no such authority and verified Biden and Harris as the winners. Hundreds of other elected Republicans refused to acknowledge Biden's victory, though a growing number acknowledged it over time. Trump's legal team sought to bring a case before the Supreme Court, but none of the 63 lawsuits they filed were successful. They pinned their hopes on Texas v. Pennsylvania, but on December 11, 2020, the Supreme Court declined to hear the case. Afterward, Trump considered ways to remain in power, including military intervention, seizing voting machines, and another appeal to the Supreme Court.

In June 2022, the House Select Committee on the January 6 Attack said it had enough evidence to recommend that the Department of Justice indict Trump, and on December 19, the committee formally made the criminal referral to the Justice Department. On August 1, 2023, Trump was indicted by a D.C. grand jury for conspiracy to defraud the United States, obstructing an official proceeding, conspiracy to obstruct an official proceeding, and conspiracy against rights; he pleaded not guilty to all charges. The Office of the Special Counsel believed there was enough evidence to convict Trump. However, given existing policy against prosecuting sitting presidents, the charges were dismissed following Trump's November 2024 election. On August 14, 2023, Trump and 18 co-defendants were indicted in Fulton County, Georgia, for their efforts to overturn the election results in that state. Four pleaded guilty. As of October 2025, the others (including Trump) have not yet been tried. The investigation into those who attacked the U.S. Capitol building was the largest criminal probe in U.S. history. Over 1,500 people were charged with federal crimes; 10 Proud Boys and Oath Keepers leaders were convicted of seditious conspiracy. However, Trump pardoned them en masse on his first day back in office in 2025.

Trump continues to falsely insist the election was stolen, telling a group of historians in mid-2021 that the election was "rigged and lost", stating in 2022 that he should be declared president or a new election held "immediately". In 2022, Trump supporters continued their attempts to overturn the election, pushing for state legislature resolutions and new lawsuits. Legal experts said public confidence in democracy was being undermined to lay the groundwork for baselessly challenging future elections. Trump continued to make these false claims during his second presidency in 2025.

==== Biden presidency ====
Joe Biden's tenure as the 46th president of the United States began with his inauguration on January 20, 2021, and ended on January 20, 2025. Biden, a member of the Democratic Party, had previously served as the 47th vice president from 2009 to 2017 under President Barack Obama, took office after defeating the Republican incumbent president Donald Trump in the 2020 presidential election. Upon his inauguration, he became the oldest president in American history, breaking the record set by Ronald Reagan. Alongside Biden's presidency, the Democratic Party also held their majorities in the House of Representatives and the Senate during the 117th U.S. Congress following the 2020 elections, thereby attained an overall federal government trifecta. Biden entered office amid the COVID-19 pandemic, an economic crisis, and increased political polarization.

Day one actions of his presidency included restoring U.S. participation in the Paris Agreement, revoking the permit for the Keystone XL pipeline and halting funding for the Mexico–United States border wall. On his second day, he issued a series of executive orders to reduce the impact of COVID-19, including invoking the Defense Production Act of 1950, and set an early goal of achieving one hundred million COVID-19 vaccinations in the United States in his first 100 days. The first major legislation signed into law by Biden was the American Rescue Plan Act of 2021, a $1.9 trillion stimulus bill that temporarily established expanded unemployment insurance and sent $1,400 stimulus checks to most Americans in response to continued economic pressure from COVID-19. He signed the bipartisan Infrastructure Investment and Jobs Act, a ten-year plan brokered by Biden alongside Democrats and Republicans in Congress to invest in American roads, bridges, public transit, ports and broadband access.

Biden proposed a significant expansion of the U.S. social safety net through the Build Back Better Act, but those efforts, along with voting rights legislation, failed in Congress. In August 2022, Biden signed the Inflation Reduction Act of 2022, a domestic appropriations bill that included some of the provisions of the Build Back Better Act after the entire bill failed to pass. It included significant federal investment in climate and domestic clean energy production, tax credits for solar panels, electric cars and other home energy programs as well as a three-year extension of Affordable Care Act subsidies, an insulin price cap, and a provision allowing Medicare to negotiate drug prices. In late 2022, Biden signed the Respect for Marriage Act, which repealed the Defense of Marriage Act and codified same-sex and interracial marriage in the United States. Other domestic legislation signed during his term included the Bipartisan Safer Communities Act, the first major federal gun control law in nearly three decades; the CHIPS and Science Act, bolstering the semiconductor and manufacturing industry; the Honoring our PACT Act, expanding health care for US veterans; the Electoral Count Reform and Presidential Transition Improvement Act; and the Juneteenth National Independence Day Act, making Juneteenth a federal holiday in the United States. Biden also unsuccessfully pushed for legislation protecting the right to abortion in response to the U.S. Supreme Court's decision in Dobbs v. Jackson Women's Health Organization overturning Roe v. Wade.

Biden appointed Ketanji Brown Jackson to the U.S. Supreme Court—the first Black woman to serve on the court. In response to the debt-ceiling crisis of 2023, he negotiated and signed the Fiscal Responsibility Act of 2023, which restrains federal spending for fiscal years 2024 and 2025, implements minor changes to SNAP and TANF, includes energy permitting reform, claws back some IRS funding and unspent money for COVID-19, and suspended the debt ceiling to January 1, 2025. He established the American Climate Corps and created the first ever White House Office of Gun Violence Prevention. On September 26, 2023, Biden visited a United Auto Workers picket line during the 2023 United Auto Workers strike, making him the first US president to visit one. Biden also rigorously enforced antitrust laws by appointing Lina Khan to head the FTC. Biden issued more individual pardons and commutations than any other president, including controversial sweeping pardons of members of his family and high-profile political figures that he claimed were either presently or expected to be the subject of "baseless and politically motivated investigations." The first sitting U.S. president to oppose the death penalty, Biden commuted the sentences of nearly all inmates on federal death row to life imprisonment weeks before leaving office.

The foreign policy goal of the Biden administration was to restore the U.S. to a "position of trusted leadership" among global democracies in order to address the challenges posed by Russia and China. Biden signed AUKUS, an international security alliance together with Australia and the United Kingdom. He supported the expansion of NATO with the additions of Finland and Sweden. Biden approved a raid which led to the death of Abu Ibrahim al-Hashimi al-Qurashi, the leader of the Islamic State, and approved a drone strike which killed Ayman Al Zawahiri, leader of Al-Qaeda. He completed the withdrawal of U.S. military forces from Afghanistan, declaring an end to nation-building efforts and shifting U.S. foreign policy toward strategic competition with China and, to a lesser extent, Russia. During the withdrawal, the Afghan government collapsed and the Taliban seized control, leading to Biden receiving bipartisan criticism. He responded to the Russian invasion of Ukraine by imposing sanctions on Russia and providing Ukraine with over $100 billion in combined military, economic, and humanitarian aid. During the Gaza war, Biden condemned the actions of Hamas and other Palestinian militants as terrorism, and announced American military support for Israel; he also sent humanitarian aid to the Gaza Strip and brokered a four-day temporary pause and hostage exchange in 2023 followed by a three-phase ceasefire in January 2025. In 2023, Biden negotiated the Camp David Principles, a security pact between Japan, South Korea, and the United States. He also oversaw the 2024 Ankara prisoner exchange, the largest prisoner exchange since the end of the Cold War, involving the release of 26 individuals, including American journalist Evan Gershkovich and former U.S. Marine Paul Whelan.

Biden began his term with over 50% approval ratings; these fell significantly after the withdrawal from Afghanistan, and remained low as the country experienced high inflation and rising gas prices, even as they later decreased during his presidency. His age and mental fitness were a frequent subject of discussion throughout his presidency, ultimately culminating in his decision to withdraw his bid for re-election in the 2024 presidential election. Trump won the election against Biden's preferred successor, Kamala Harris, making him the second U.S. president to be succeeded in office by his predecessor. (Note: The first person was Benjamin Harrison as he was succeeded in office by his predecessor Grover Cleveland in 1893.) Biden oversaw the strongest economic recovery of any G7 nation post COVID-19 and one of the strongest economic recoveries in United States history, breaking a 70-year record for low unemployment, and the creation of over 16 million new jobs, the most of any single term president. During Biden's time in office, median wages stagnated, and the share of wealth of the wealthiest 0.1% of Americans continued to increase.

Although some political scientists and historians have rated Biden's presidency favorably, his political legacy is interwoven with the re-election of Trump in 2024.
