= George Henriquez =

Nicaraguan activist (born c. 1986)

George Patrick Henriquez Cayasso
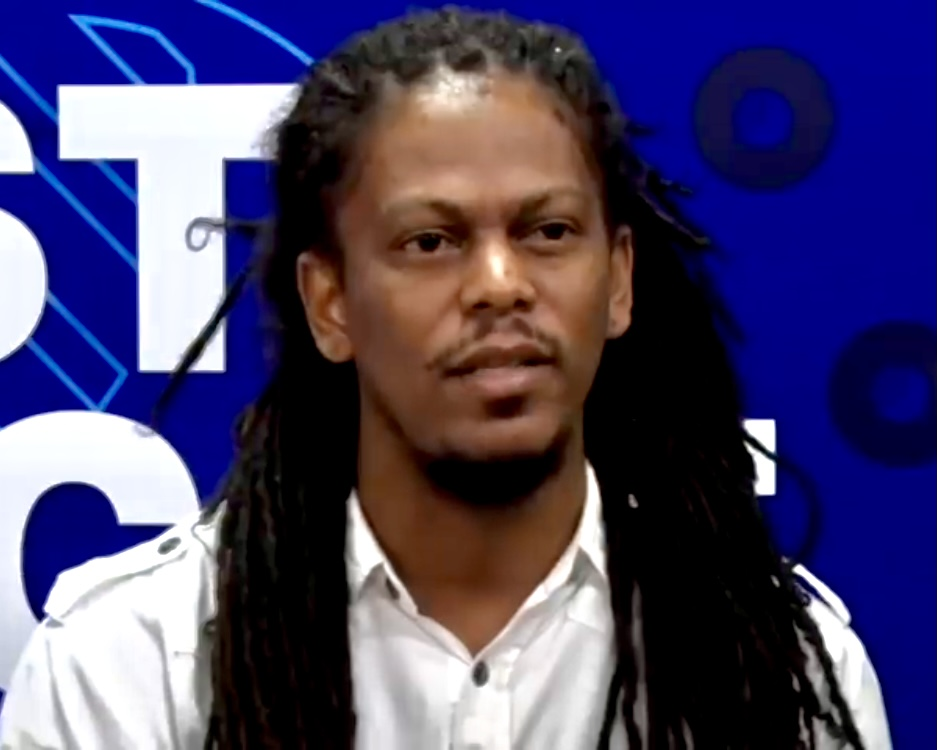
- Henriquez in 2020
- Born: c. 1986 (age 39–40); Pearl Lagoon, Nicaragua
- Education: Bluefields Indian and Caribbean University; University of the Autonomous Regions of the Nicaraguan Caribbean Coast
- Occupation: Activist

George Patrick Henriquez Cassayo (born c. 1986) is a Nicaraguan activist. Hailing from Nicaragua's Caribbean Coast, Henriquez is a former YATAMA party activist and served on its behalf as a member of the executive committee unified National Coalition opposition group in 2020. In 2021 he was a pre-candidate for president in the Nicaraguan general election with the Citizens for Liberty Alliance (ACxL).

== Early life ==
George Patrick Henriquez Cassayo was born in Laguna de Perla and resides in Bluefields, Nicaragua. He is a native Creole speaker. He graduated from Bluefields Indian and Caribbean University (BICU) where he studied tourism and hotel business administration. He also earned a master's degree in gender, ethnicity and intercultural citizenship from University of the Autonomous Regions of the Nicaraguan Caribbean Coast (UCCRAN).

== Career ==
In the 2016 general elections, Henriquez was a candidate for South Caribbean Coast Autonomous Region (RACCS) regional deputy for YATAMA to the National Assembly.

He was a member of national council of the Blue and White National Unity movement, and is a member of the Autoconvened Coastal Movement of Bluefields; he has been subject to police surveillance and harassment of those activities. In 2019, judging him to be at risk of grave, urgent and irreparable harm, the Inter-American Commission on Human Rights issued precautionary measures intended to protect his life.

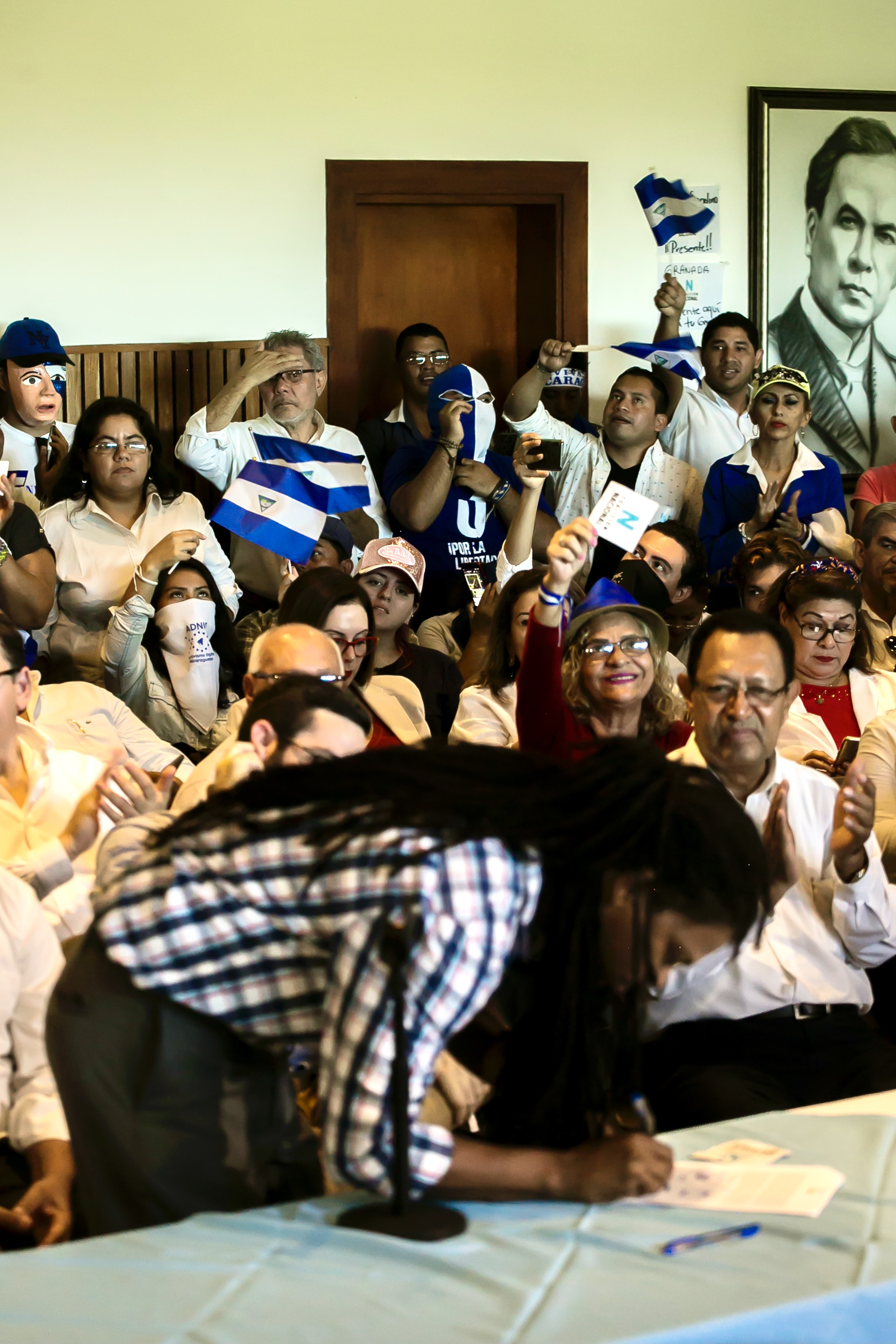
Supporters including Saturnino Cerrato (front row, right) applaud as Henriquez signs the National Coalition proclamation in February 2020

On February 25, 2020, Henriquez signed the proclamation of unity of the National Coalition, on behalf of the YATAMA regional party. The signatory organizations pledged to work to develop a unified opposition to mount an electoral challenge to Daniel Ortega, following on years of protest in the country. The other representatives signing the document were Jesús Tefel, Medardo Mairena, Carlos Tünnerman, Saturnino Cerrato, Luis Fley, and María Haydee Osuna.

In July 2020, he became a member of the executive committee of the National Coalition, likewise representing the YATAMA party.

On June 3, 2021, Henriquez formalized his intention to become a pre-candidate for president with the Citizens for Liberty Alliance (ACxL), and announced he had disaffiliated from the YATAMA party and presented as an independent candidate. The split came over YATAMA leader, National Assembly Deputy Brooklyn Rivera's vote to re-elect FSLN loyalist Lumberto Campbell to the Supreme Electoral Council. If nominated, Henriquez would have faced FSLN incumbent Daniel Ortega, who seeks a fourth re-election to the presidency in the general election of November 7, 2021. Henriquez would have been the first black candidate for the presidency of Nicaragua; he was the youngest (35) in the contest.

Henriquez has expressed his position on issues such as the rights of the LGBTIQ community and women, the autonomy of the Caribbean Coast including; sanitation, advancement of the agricultural and livestock frontier, territorial demarcation, economic decentralization, educational decentralization and his vision of the country's political class.
