= Berta Valle =

Nicaraguan television presenter and human rights activist

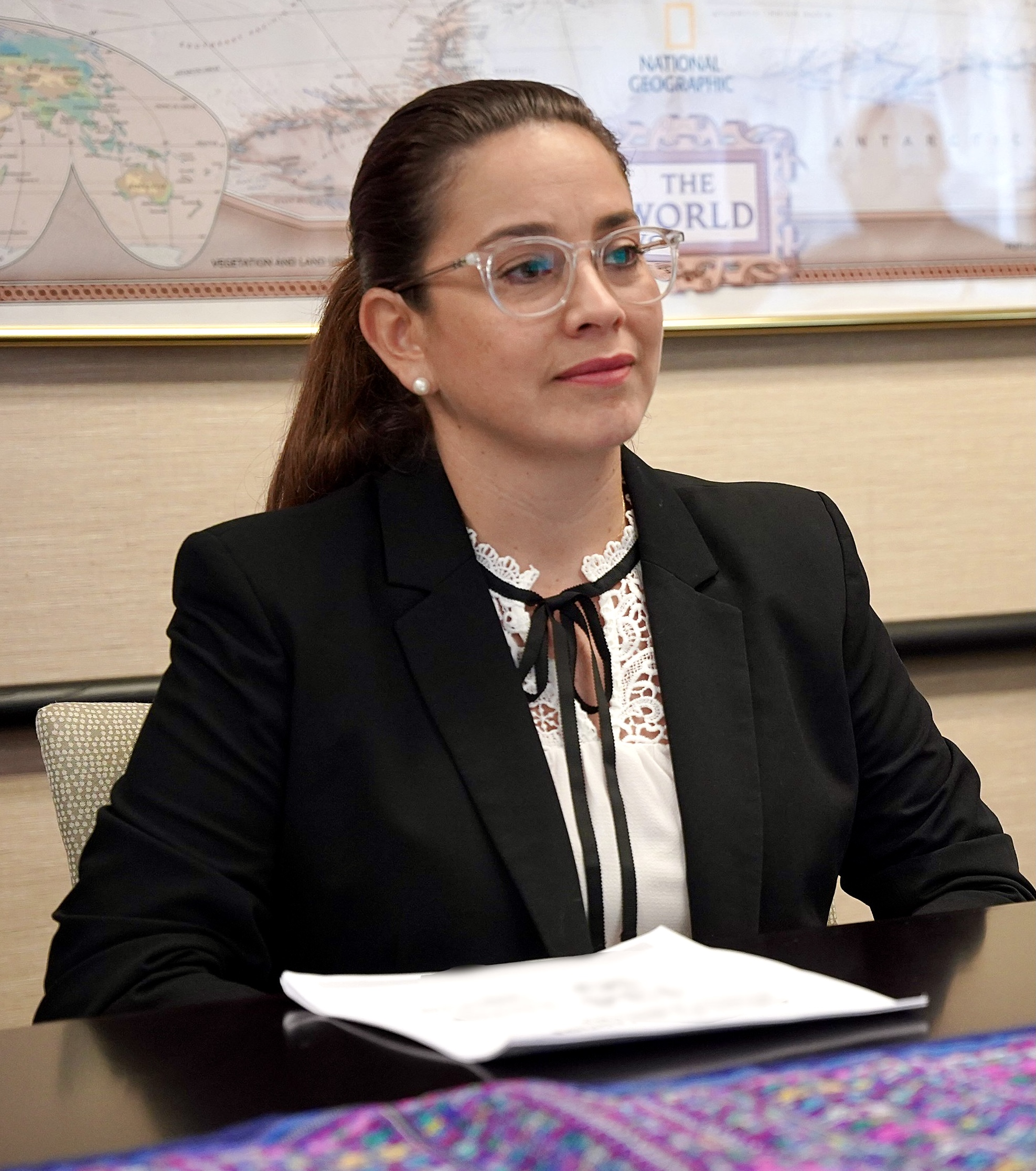
- Valle in 2021
- Born: 1984 (age 41–42); Juigalpa, Chontales
- Occupations: Television presenter, human rights activist
- Spouse: Félix Maradiaga (m. 2006)
- Children: 1

Berta Valle (born c. 1984) is a Nicaraguan television presenter and human rights activist. She is married to former 2021 presidential pre-candidate Félix Maradiaga, who was detained by the government of Daniel Ortega on June 8, 2021.

== Early life and education ==
Valle, born circa 1984, grew up with two brothers. She holds a BS in Business Economics from the Catholic University of Nicaragua and an MBA from INCAE Business School in Managua.

In 2003, she was crowned queen of the Carnaval Alegría por la Vida.

== Career ==
Valle spent eight years working as a television presenter on the morning show Primera Hora. She also worked as a station manager at Vos TV, and on a show she created in 2015 with Xiomara Blandino called Berta y Xiomara: Todo en Positivo.

In 2016, Valle was nominated as an independent to represent Managua in the National Assembly by the Independent Liberal Party (PLI) as part of its National Coalition for Democracy. She was the first candidate listed on the party’s electoral slate, but Nicaragua’s Supreme Court, controlled by Ortega loyalists, disqualified the party’s electoral coalition and Valle was blocked from running.

Since 2019, she has led Voces en Libertad, a nonprofit promoting cooperation among members of Nicaragua’s independent media who fled the country following the 2018 sociopolitical crisis.

On June 8, 2021, her husband Félix Maradiaga became part of a wave of arrests of opposition pre-candidates for president in the 2021 Nicaraguan general election. Valle has coordinated defense teams supporting him in and outside of Nicaragua. On July 27, 2021, the Nicaraguan Public Ministry and Nicaraguan National Police announced an investigation of Valle under controversial Law 1055, accusing her of being a “traitor to the homeland,” based on her international advocacy for pressure to release her detained husband. Victoria Cárdenas, wife of Juan Sebastián Chamorro, another detained candidate, was similarly accused.

== Personal life ==
She married Maradiaga circa 2006. Since 2018, Valle has been living in exile in the United States with the couple’s daughter (born circa 2014).
