= Carlos Tünnermann =

Nicaraguan politician (1933–2024)

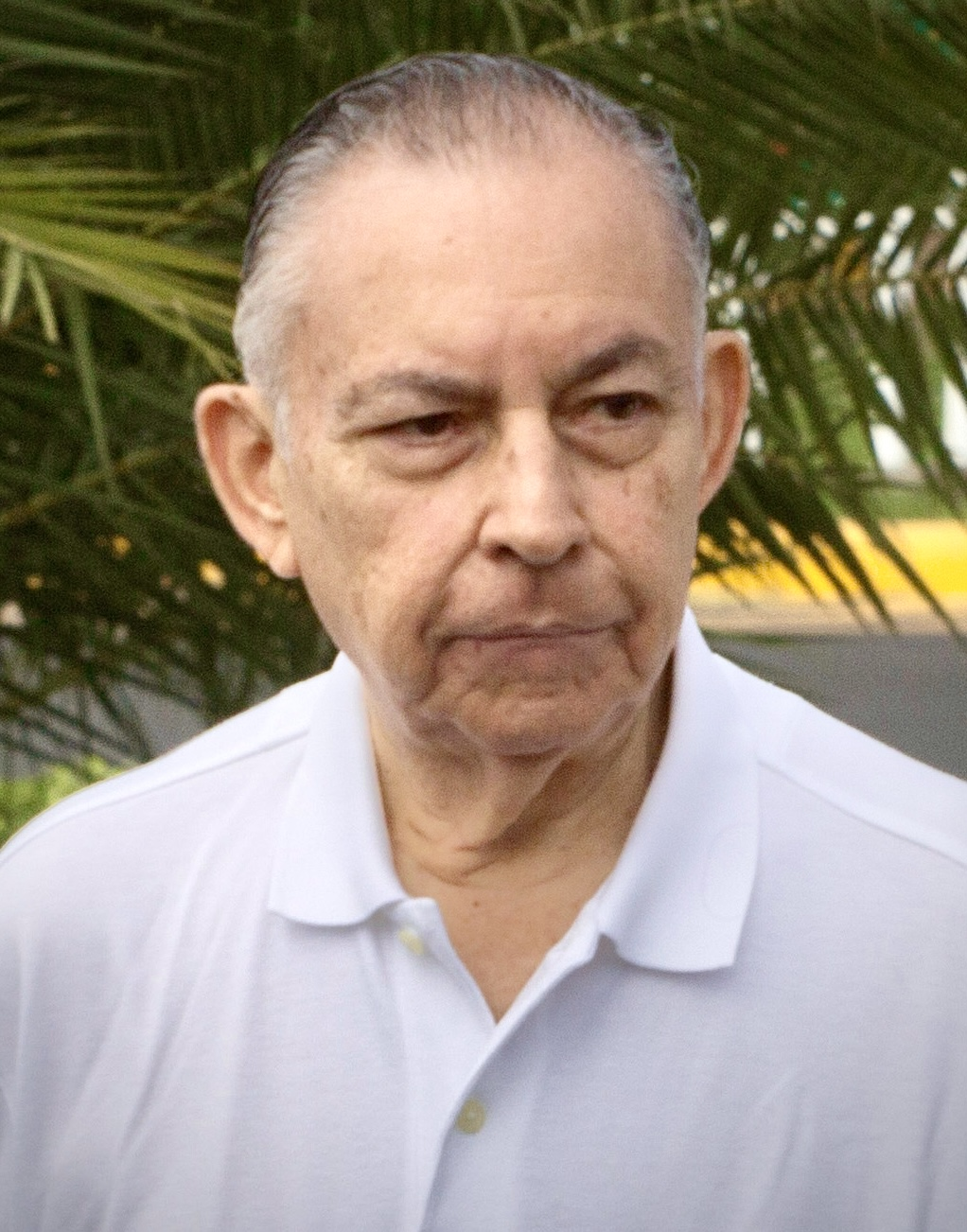
- Tünnermann in 2013

Minister of Education
- In office 1979–1984

Ambassador
- In office 1984–1988

Personal details
- Born: 10 May 1933 Managua, Nicaragua
- Died: 27 March 2024 (aged 90) Managua, Nicaragua

Carlos Tünnermann Bernheim (10 May 1933 – 27 March 2024) was a Nicaraguan lawyer, diplomat, government official and educator. He was a Minister of Education in Nicaragua, serving during the Sandinista National Liberation Front (FSLN) government from 1979 to 1984. He next became Nicaragua's ambassador to the United States and then to the Organization of American States (OAS), from 1984 to 1988.

Tünnermann's father had been head of the Nicaraguan Central Bank. A lawyer by training, Tünnermann defended Tomás Borge after the 1956 assassination of President Anastasio Somoza García. From 1964 to 1974, Tünnermann was rector of the National Autonomous University of Nicaragua at León. There he met eventual human rights lawyer and Nicaraguan Center for Human Rights president Vilma Núñez as well as his successor as rector and later president of Nicaragua's Supreme Electoral Council Mariano Fiallos Oyanguren.

In 1977, Tünnermann was a member of the Group of Twelve establishment figures in Nicaragua who signed a letter of support for the Sandinistas, helping legitimize the movement.

Tünnermann was twice awarded a Guggenheim Fellowship in education, in 1973 and 1989.

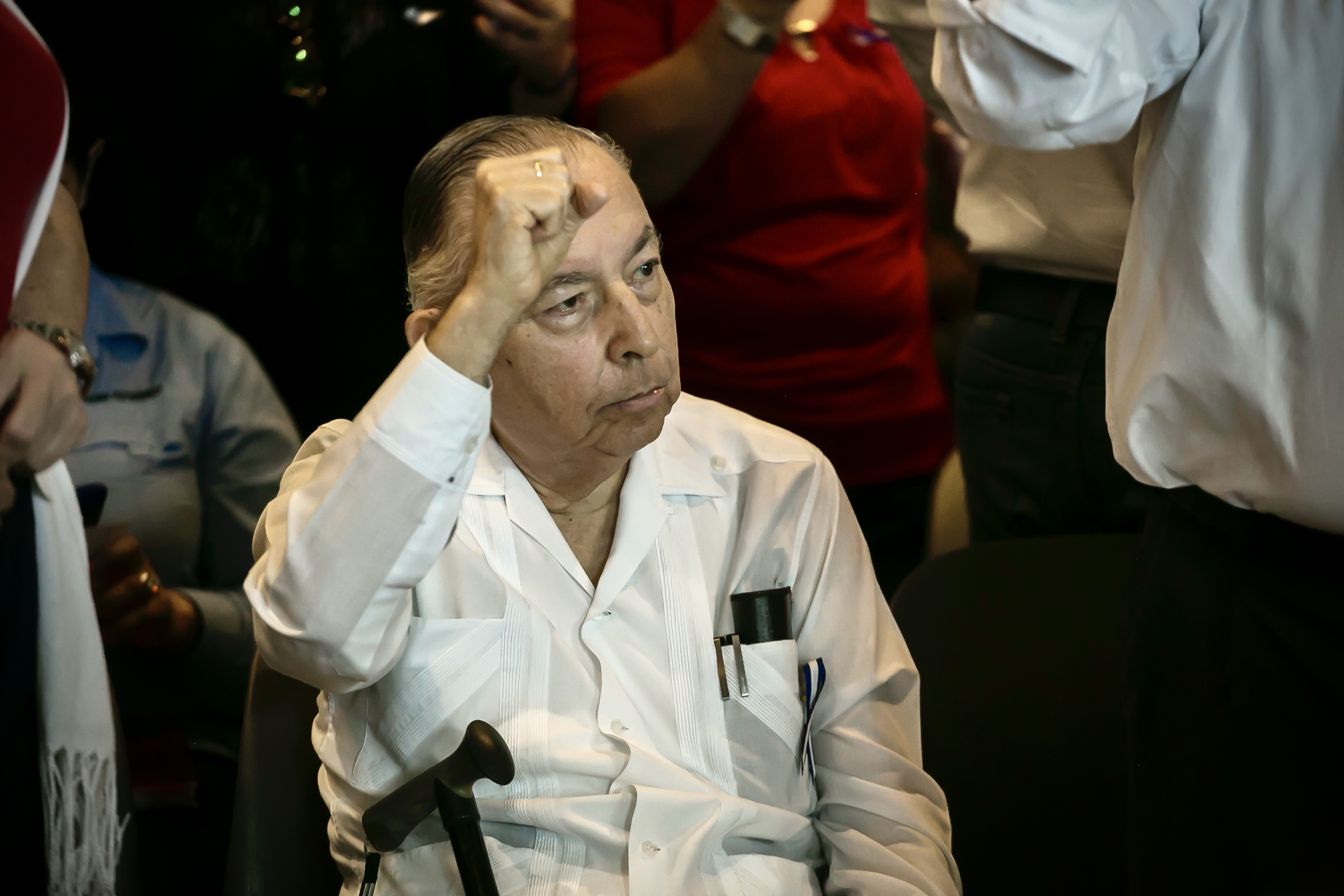
Carlos Tünnerman raises fist at National Coalition proclamation signing, 2020

On 25 February 2020, Tünnermann was a signatory to the proclamation of unity of the National Coalition. The signatory organizations pledged to work to develop a unified opposition to mount an electoral challenge to Daniel Ortega, following years of protest in the country. The other representatives signing the document were Jesús Tefel, Medardo Mairena, George Henriquez, Saturnino Cerrato, Luis Fley, and María Haydee Osuna.

== Personal life ==
Tünnermann married Rosa Carlota Pereira. Tünnermann died on 27 March 2024, at the age of 90.

== Books ==
- Tünnermann Bernheim, Carlos (1976). La investigación en la universidad latinoamericana (in Spanish). Ediciones del Consejo Nacional de Educación Superior, Secretariado General Permanente.
- Tünnermann Bernheim, Carlos (1991). Historia de la universidad en América Latina: de la Epoca Colonial a la Reforma de Córdoba (in Spanish). San José, Costa Rica: Editorial Universitaria Centroamericana. ISBN 978-9977-30-167-9. OCLC 25246317.
- Tünnermann Bernheim, Carlos (1997). La paideia en Ruben Darío: una aproximación (in Spanish). Academia Nicaragüense de la Lengua.
- Tünnermann Bernheim, Carlos (2008). Noventa años de la reforma universitaria de Córdoba (1918-2008) (in Spanish). Ciudad de Buenos Aires, Argentina: CLACSO. ISBN 978-1-4492-0488-4. OCLC 884726305.
