= Oscar Sobalvarro =

Nicaraguan politician

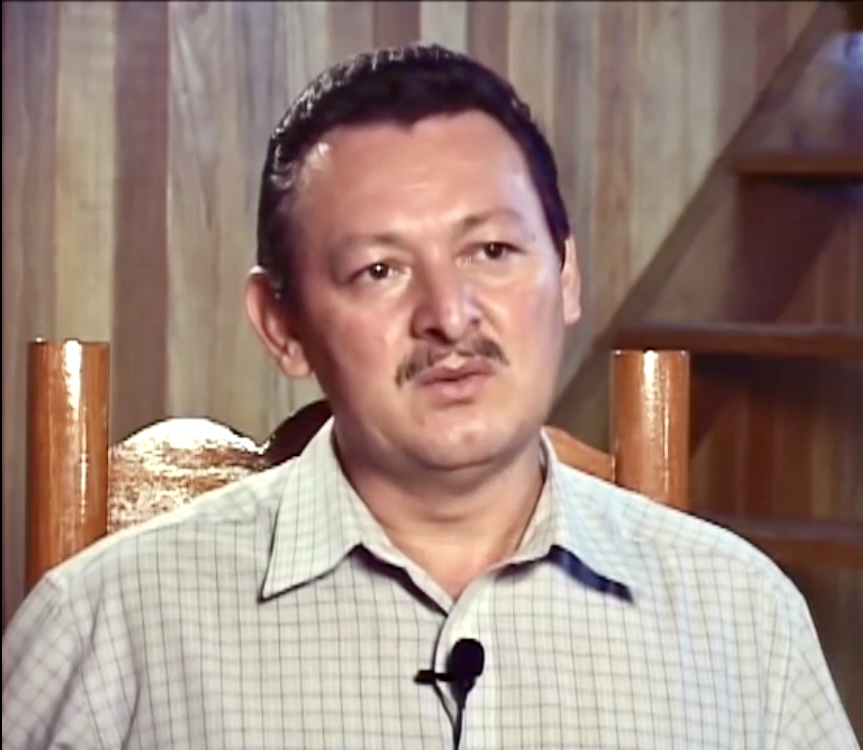
- Sobalvarro in 2005
- Born: December 23, 1960 (age 65); Santa María de Pantasma, Jinotega, Nicaragua
- Other name: Commandante Ruben
- Organization: Nicaraguan Resistance

Oscar Manuel Sobalvarro Garcia (born December 23, 1960) is a former commander in the Nicaraguan Resistance (a US-backed Contra group) fighting the Sandinista National Liberation Front, of which he was a former army soldier. Professionally he was a farmer and salesman. His nom-de-guerre was "Commandante Ruben."

== Early life ==
Oscar Manuel Sobalvarro Garcia was born in El Venado, Jinotega, on December 23, 1960. He attended school through the fourth grade.

== Career ==
Sobalvarro joined the Resistance on March 20, 1980. He became commander of the Salvador Perez Regional Command. His brother, Luis Armando, was the Regional Command's Executive Officer; another brother, Julio Cesar, was Commanding Officer of Task Force Martiza Zeledon. All three brothers are former Sandinista fighters.

Sobalvarro played a central role in the Contra demobilization talks that followed the 1990 electoral defeat of incumbent President Daniel Ortega of the FSLN and election of UNO’s Violeta Barrios de Chamorro. The FSLN insisted the Contras demobilized before they handed over power.

In 2021, he is vice-president of the center-right Citizens for Freedom (CxL) party in Nicaragua, part of the Citizen Alliance with the Partido Movimiento de Unidad Costeña (Pamuc). Four candidates have registered for consideration as the Citizen Alliance’s candidate for president in the 2021 Nicaraguan general election—Arturo Cruz, Juan Sebastián Chamorro, Noel Vidaurre and Américo Treminio—though opposition groups hope the Citizen Alliance and the National Coalition will present a unified candidate to compete against Daniel Ortega, running for his fifth term. Sobalvarro is the CxL representative in these negotiations.
