= Canal 15 (Nicaraguan TV channel) =

Nicaraguan cable V channel

Canal 15 (formerly known as 100% Noticias) was a Nicaraguan cable TV channel broadcasting from the city of Managua and founded by the local journalist Miguel Mora Barberena and his wife Verónica Chavez.

== History ==
100% Noticias started in October 1995 as a news program on local channel 23. It later became a 24-hour news channel on the defunct Estesa cable TV system.

The channel was rebranded to Canal 15 in 2009.

On December 21, 2018, the Nicaraguan Institute of Telecommunications and Postal Services revoked the operation license of Canal 15 and raided its offices. The director Miguel Mora and journalist Lucía Pineda Ubau were jailed and accused of inciting terrorism in the context of the 2018 Nicaragua protests. The government confiscated the channel's facilities and continues to occupy them.

In November 2019, Canal 6 started occupying the terrestrial signal with a secondary channel, Canal 15, carrying educational and cultural programming.
