= Miguel Mora (journalist) =

Nicaraguan journalist (born 1965)

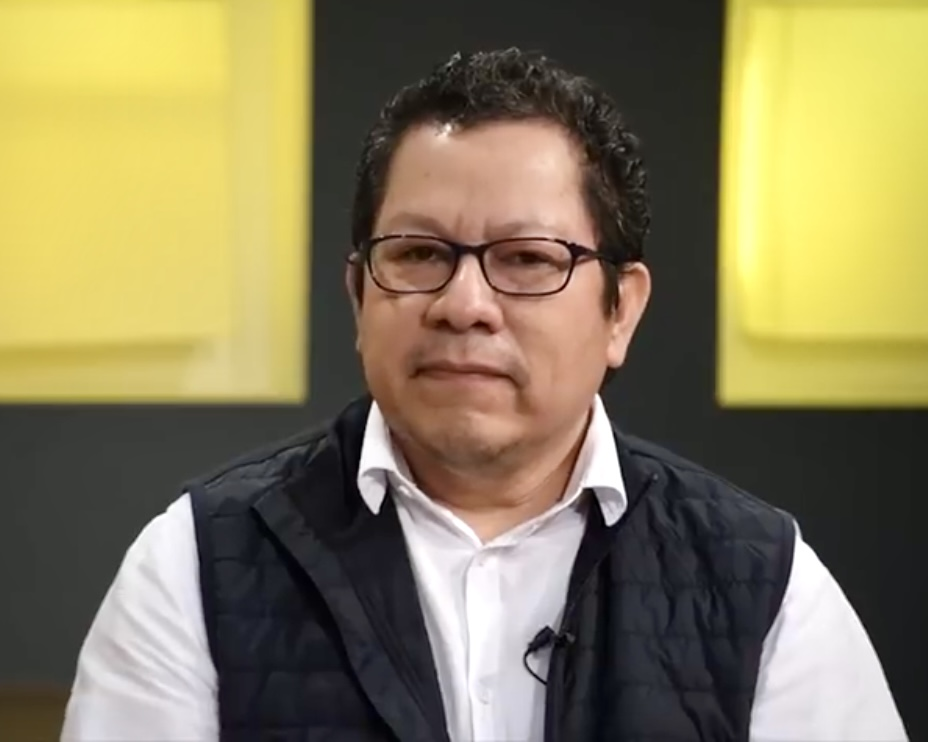
- Mora in 2019
- Born: Miguel de los Ángeles Mora Barberena; August 20, 1965 (age 61); Managua
- Education: Central American University
- Occupation: Journalist
- Organization: 100% Noticias
- Political party: Democratic Restoration Party
- Spouse: Verónica Chavez

Miguel de los Ángeles Mora Barberena (born August 20, 1965) is a Nicaraguan journalist and political candidate. With his wife Verónica Chávez, he founded cable news channel 100% Noticias. In June 2021, Mora was arrested in a wave of detentions of opposition figures and other civic leaders, including seven aspiring opposition candidates for president in the 2021 Nicaraguan general election.

== Biography ==
Miguel de los Ángeles Mora Barberena was born on August 20, 1965, in the Quinta Nina neighborhood in Managua. He grew up in poverty, with his parents working washing clothes, preparing food and serving as street vendors. His grandfather's love of radio journalism inspired Mora's interest in the field and he pursued his education on a scholarship to the Instituto Loyola.

Mora participated in the National Literacy Crusade and worked harvesting coffee before becoming a military reservist in 1982. In 1984 he enlisted in military service which he continued until 1986.

In 1989, Mora began studying journalism at the Central American University (UCA) and in 1991 he began an internship in television. In October 1995, he struck out with his new venture, 100% Noticias, asking then-president Violeta Barrios de Chamorro for a 15-minute slot on the state-run Channel 6 to do his newscast.

In the years that followed, across four different presidential administrations, 100% Noticias functioned as an independent outlet and was often sought out by the party that was out of power as a platform. In a 2019 interview, Mora described their journalistic philosophy: "When [the Sandinista National Liberation Front] were opposition and liberalism was declaring Sandinismo a dangerous ideology and Sandinistas were third class citizens, 100% Noticias gave coverage to the FSLN in opposition. When Alemán left office and there was persecution from Enrique Bolaños government and the PLC's liberalism goes through the same, with good reason or not, we gave liberalism an opportunity on our station. And when the FSLN returns to power, we maintained a balanced editorial line."

However, with press freedoms narrowing 100% Noticias elected to give increasing spaces to voices shut out of official channels. This came to a head with the protests that began in April 2018 and the ensuing government crackdown on opposition. 100% Noticias's mobile television unit allowed for it to disseminate citizen-journalist video broadly throughout the country and the channel became a symbol of press freedom as well as visibility for behavior of the ruling government. What they witnessed impacted not only the audience but also the editorial position of the channel: "When they break away from morality and start killing people, when they decided to shoot to kill and we see dead youths with shots in the head, neck and thorax, we said there was no reason for this and we took on a strong position and an editorial decision to be on the side of the victims and the people." They continued broadcasting around the clock for eight months until December 2018 when Mora was arrested, with journalist Lucía Pineda Ubau, for alleged "incitement to hatred", "conspiring" and "terrorism." Both were held as political prisoners for 172 days. The government also confiscated the television channel's facilities. Following their release from prison, they have broadcast 100% Noticias via social media channels instead. After being released from prison in 2019 he said the following "That is the most horrendous thing that could happen to a human being. They bury you alive to destroy you morally, to break you, so your thoughts and principles change in their favor."

Mora's imprisonment motivated him to begin participating in politics. As a member of the Superior Council for Private Enterprise and a former political prisoner, he hoped to be invited to join the like-minded Civic Alliance for Justice and Democracy (ACJD), but ultimately it was pastor Saturnino Cerrato and other leaders of the Democratic Restoration Party (PRD) who reached out to him. Mora became a PRD pre-candidate within the National Coalition for the Nicaraguan presidency in the 2021 Nicaraguan general election. However the government revoked the PRD's legal charter (and thus, standing to field a candidate) in May 2021.

On June 20, 2021, Mora was arrested in a wave of detentions of opposition figures and other civic leaders that began with the arrests of four other pre-candidates for president; he is the fifth to be detained.

On February 5, 2022, together with Maria Fernanda Flores, wife of Arnoldo Alemán, they were found guilty of "attempting national security" by the Sandinista regime under charges of conspiracy, the sentence was expected to be announced on February 9. He was sentenced to thirteen years in prison and in 2023 he was stripped of his Nicaraguan nationality and expelled from the country to the United States along with 300 opponents of the Ortega and Murillo regime.
