= Walter Espinoza =

Nicaraguan politician

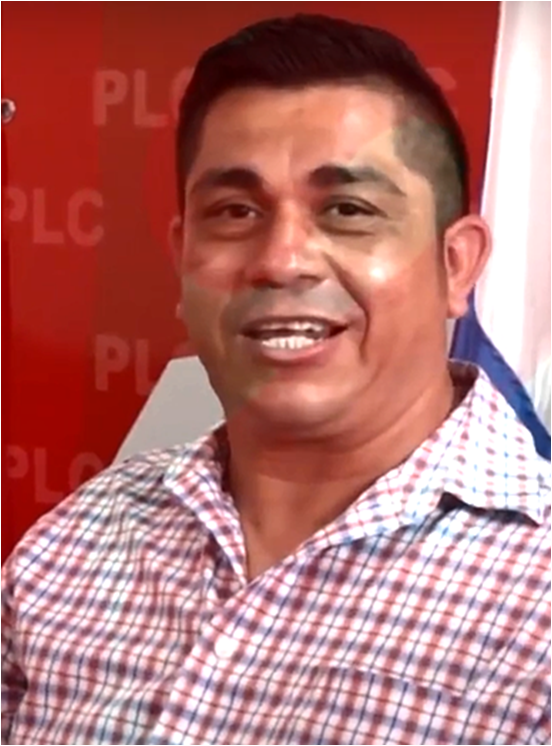
- Espinoza in June 2021

Member of the National Assembly of Nicaragua
- Incumbent
- Assumed office 9 January 2017
- Constituency: National list

Councilor of Managua
- In office 2012–2016

Personal details
- Born: Walter Edén Espinoza Fernández; December 6, 1979 (age 46) Managua, Nicaragua
- Citizenship: Nicaraguan
- Party: PLC
- Spouse: Lissette Murillo
- Education: Universidad de Managua
- Occupation: Politician

Walter Edén Espinoza Fernández (born 6 December 1979) is a Nicaraguan politician of the Constitutional Liberal Party (PLC). He has been a member of the National Assembly of Nicaragua since 9 January 2017 and previously served as a councilor of Managua from 2012 to 2016. In 2021, he was the presidential candidate of the PLC.

== Early life and education ==
Espinoza was born on 6 December 1979, in the Barrio Edgar Lang (also spelled Edgard Lang) of Managua into a poor family. As a child and teenager, he worked selling food, newspapers (including La Prensa), and other items on the streets of Managua to help support his mother.

He joined the youth organization of the Constitutional Liberal Party (PLC) in 1996 at the age of 16. He later studied Tourism and Hotel Administration at the Universidad de Managua.

For approximately ten years he worked as a driver (chauffeur) for PLC figures, including Martha Ramírez, former director of the Civil Registry.

== Political career ==
Espinoza began his political career in the lower ranks of the PLC. He was elected councilor of Managua in the 2012 municipal elections. In the 2016 general elections, he was elected as a deputy to the National Assembly, taking office on 9 January 2017.

In August 2021, after the resignation of Milton Arcia, the PLC leadership (under president María Haydée Osuna) designated Espinoza as the party’s presidential candidate for the November 2021 general elections. He finished second with approximately 14.15% of the vote, behind incumbent president Daniel Ortega. Critics and opposition groups described him and the PLC as part of the “collaborative opposition” or “false candidates” that participated in elections controlled by the ruling Sandinista National Liberation Front (FSLN).

Espinoza has served on several National Assembly commissions, including the Commission on Population, Development and Municipal Affairs.

== Personal life ==
He is married to Lissette Murillo. The couple lives in the Los Vanegas area of Managua.
