= Medardo Mairena =

Nicaraguan peasant leader (born c. 1977)

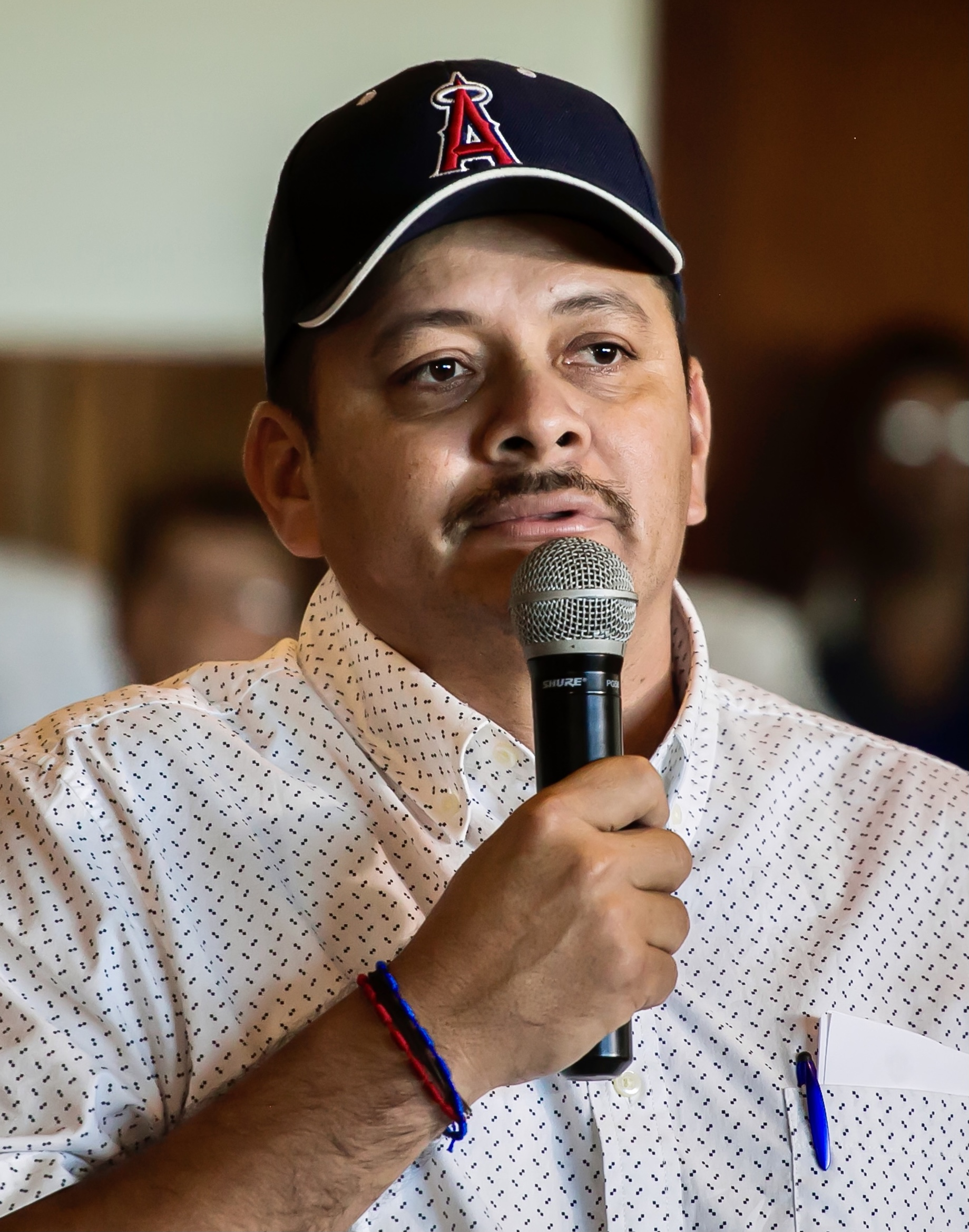
- Mairena in 2020
- Born: c. 1977 (age 48–49); Nueva Guinea, Nicaragua
- Citizenship: Nicaragua
- Occupations: Farmer; Activist
- Known for: Peasant movement

Medardo Mairena Sequeira (born c. 1977) is a Nicaraguan farmer and coordinator of the peasant (campesino) movement. Mairena has worked in the peasant anti-canal movement since 2013 and has been an active opposition leader since the national protests broke out in late April 2018, participating in the National Dialogue between protestors and the government of Daniel Ortega, mediated by the Catholic Church. Two months later he became one of a large number of dissidents arrested and prosecuted for terrorism; Mairena was sentenced to 261 years in prison, serving one year before he was released under a negotiated Amnesty Law.

In 2021 Mairena was one of the opposition pre-candidates seeking to challenge Ortega who is running for a fifth term in the November general election. On 5 July 2021, Mairena was arrested again, the sixth opposition pre-candidate and one of two dozen opposition figures jailed since the beginning of June 2021.

== Early life ==
Mairena is originally from Nueva Guinea, Nicaragua, where he attended school through the sixth grade. His siblings include brothers Gabriel and Alfredo.

== Professional life ==
Medardo Mairena has lived in Punta Gorda (near Bluefields on the southern part of Nicaragua's Caribbean coast) since about 2000. There he owns 109 hectares (155 manzanas) of land in Punta Gorda, where he grows corn, quiquisque, and yucca, and became a local leader in the community of Atlanta. He comes from a family of liberals and joined the Constitutionalist Liberal Party (PLC) when he was elected to the Regional Council of the South Caribbean (Bluefields).

When Mairena joined the peasant movement, however, he was stripped of party affiliation. In 2013, he became involved in the peasant anti-canal movement, seeking to repeal Law 840, which granted a 100-year concession to a Chinese businessman to dig an interoceanic canal across the country; the concession expropriated 50 km of land on each side of the proposed route, involving the displacement of tens of thousands of peasants, many indigenous. While Mairena had initially been excited by the prospect of the canal passing near him, it quickly became clear he could lose his land. He began organizing, ultimately helping stage almost 100 marches in opposition to the canal and becoming coordinator of the movement.

In 2018, his national profile rose with his participation in the National Dialogue in May 2018, negotiated by the Catholic Church following protests that began in April and the ensuing bloody repression by the government of Daniel Ortega. Mairena is a member of the Civic Alliance for Justice and Democracy representing the peasant movement, and confronted Ortega in the first session, saying, "I want you to know, Mr. President, that it is the peasants who are demanding justice, because we have demanded justice from many scenarios and we have not been heard. We have joined in supporting young people. We have no weapons, we are a civilian body."

On 13 July 2018, as Mairena and fellow peasant leader Pedro Joaquín Mena Amador prepared to travel outside the country, they were stopped and imprisoned. Mairena was accused of terrorism, most notably of directing an attack on 12 July in Morrito that killed four police officers and a professor; however media coverage showed Mairena attending a march in Managua that day as did other witnesses, who said he was preparing for his trip. Government media reported that searches of the peasants' personal devices had revealed a "giant terrorist and coup plot", but at trial the computer expert could not confirm any incriminating information had been recovered. Mairena was nevertheless sentenced to 261 years, and reported being tortured in prison before his release after one year, under an amnesty law. Independent media noted that what Mairena had in common with others convicted under the same terms was his prominence as a leader in his sector of Nicaraguan society and as a critic of the ruling government.

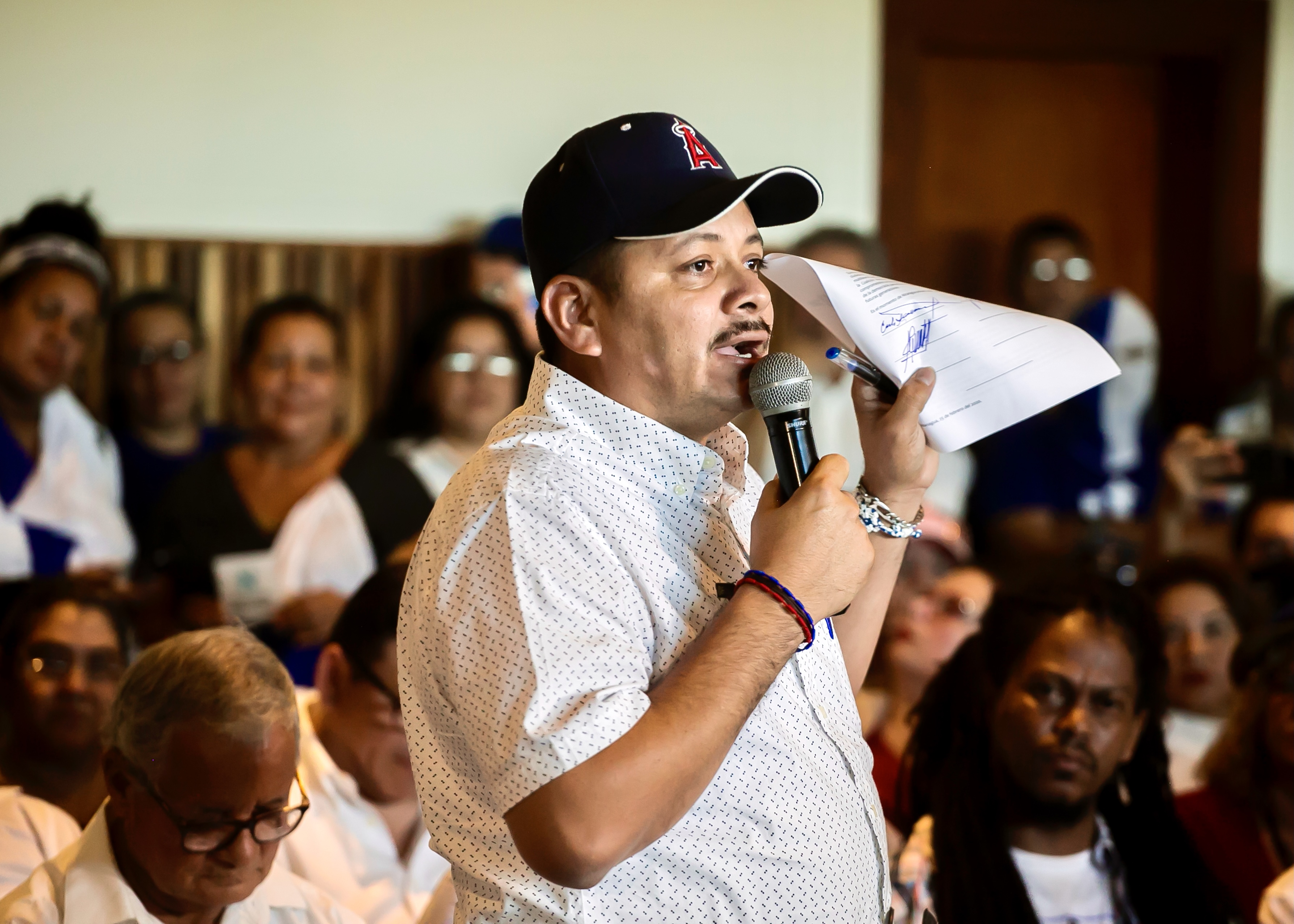
Mairena holds up the National Coalition proclamation of unity at the signing on 25 February 2020

On 25 February 2020, Mairena signed the proclamation of unity of the National Coalition. The signatories pledged to work toward a unified opposition to mount an electoral challenge to Daniel Ortega, following on years of protest in the country. The other representatives signing the document were Jesús Tefel, George Henriquez, Carlos Tünnerman, Saturnino Cerrato, Luis Fley, and María Haydee Osuna.

In 2021, Mairena was one of the opposition pre-candidates seeking to challenge incumbent Daniel Ortega as Ortega sought a fifth term as president in the 2021 Nicaraguan general election. Mairena was re-arrested on the night of 5 July 2021. He is the sixth pre-candidate to be detained and one of roughly two dozen of opposition and civic leaders detained by the Ortega government since the beginning of June 2021. By law, citizens under investigation cannot run for public office. Two other peasant leaders, Mena and Freddy Alberto Navas López, and two student leaders, Lesther Lenin Alemán Alfaro and Max Isaac Jerez Meza, were also arrested that night. They are accused of violations of Law 1055, "performing acts that undermine independence, sovereignty, and self-determination". The controversial law, passed by the Sandinista-controlled legislature in December 2020, allows the government to arrest anyone it designates as a "traitor to the homeland". All detained have been sentenced to 90 days of preventative detention.

Jurists have questioned the legality of Mairena's arrest as the press release from the National Police refers to crimes he was prosecuted for in 2018; as he was subsequently granted amnesty, the arrest constitutes double jeopardy, human rights attorneys Yonarqui Martínez and Gonzalo Carrión argued. Others question the constitutionality of Law 1055; human rights lawyer and Nicaraguan Center for Human Rights president Vilma Núñez has said it is overbroad and poorly defined to the extent that it becomes a "generalized criminalization of everything that involves criticism or an opposing position."

== Personal life ==
Mairena is married to Eyder García. He has three children.
