= Fawn Hall =

American civil servant

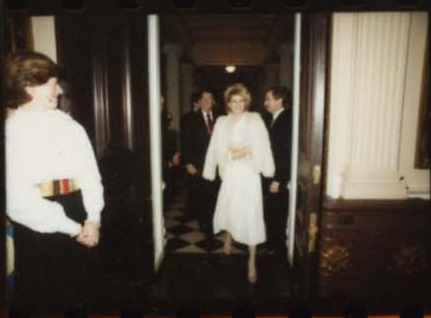
- Hall attending a White House Christmas party in 1984
- Born: September 4, 1959 (age 66); Annandale, Virginia, U.S.
- Education: Annandale High School (1977)
- Occupation: Secretary
- Employer: U.S. National Security Council (1983–87)
- Known for: Iran–Contra affair
- Spouse(s): Danny Sugerman (m. 1993; died 2005) Oliver North (m. 2025)
- Partner(s): Rob Lowe (1987); Arturo Cruz Jr. (1985–1986)

Fawn Hall (born September 4, 1959) is a former secretary to Lieutenant Colonel Oliver North who gained fame for her role in the Iran–Contra affair by helping North shred confidential documents. On August 27, 2025, Hall and North were married.

== Early life ==
Born September 4, 1959, in Annandale, Virginia, Hall graduated from Annandale High School in 1977. She began working part-time in a clerical position for the United States Navy, beginning in January 1976 while she was in high school. After graduating, she began working full-time for the Navy at the Pentagon. In 1987, Hall lived in Annandale, with her mother and stepfather.

== Career ==
=== 1983–1986: Secretary to Oliver North ===
==== Involvement in Iran–Contra ====
Hall was detailed from the Navy to work at the National Security Council on February 26, 1983, as Oliver North's secretary. She worked for North until she was fired on November 25, 1986, at the height of the scandal. Hall's mother, Wilma Hall, was secretary to Robert McFarlane, Reagan's national security advisor, North's superior, and a major player in the Iran–Contra affair. In one mishap, Hall transposed the digits of a Swiss bank account number, resulting in a contribution from the Sultan of Brunei to the Contras being credited to a Swiss businessman's bank account instead of the intended account.

In June 1987, Hall, herself, began two days of testimony in front of the United States Congress. She confessed to altering, shredding a large number of documents (so much was destroyed, she said, that the office shredder jammed), and smuggling others in her boots and inside her clothing and giving them to North on November 25, 1986, who was fired after his role in orchestrating potentially illegal aid to the Nicaraguan Contras became public. Among her other testimony was an assertion that, "Sometimes you have to go above the law." Journalist Bob Woodward recorded that her legal defense justification was summarized in her words: "We shred everything". In 1989, in exchange for her testimony against North for the Iran–Contra affair, she was granted immunity from prosecution.

=== 1987–1995: Life after the Iran–Contra affair ===
After the Iran–Contra affair broke, Hall briefly went back to work for the Navy in 1987 for less than 6 months. She was invited to the 1987 White House Correspondents' Dinner by journalist Michael Kelly. After her congressional testimony in June 1987, she left government service and signed with the William Morris Agency and unsuccessfully pursued a media career in the Washington, D.C., area.

Playboy and Penthouse offered six-figure payments for nude photoshoots to Hall, as well as two other women involved in high-profile 1987 scandals, Donna Rice and Jessica Hahn. Hall and Rice declined all offers, whereas Hahn agreed to appear in Playboy.

In April 1990, Hall was a freelance TV reporter in Pittsburgh. In 1992, Hall worked for a law firm in Los Angeles, California, and she pursued a modeling career for several years.

== Personal life ==
=== Relationships ===
In 1985, Arturo Cruz Jr. made several trips on behalf of the United Nicaraguan Opposition (UNO) to the office of LTCOL North at the U.S. National Security Council, where he met Ms. Hall, and began a well-publicized relationship.

Hall later dated the actor Rob Lowe, who tracked her down after seeing her at the Oliver North trial, and the couple attended Jack Lemmon's AFI Life Achievement Award ceremony in 1988.

In April 1993, Hall married Danny Sugerman, former manager of The Doors. The Sugermans lived in the Hollywood Hills. She reportedly admitted to the use of cocaine while she held jobs on the National Security Council staff and at the Pentagon.

It was reported that Sugerman had introduced Hall to crack cocaine shortly after their marriage. She became addicted and suffered a non-lethal overdose in 1994, following which she went into rehab. Sugerman died in 2005 of lung cancer, and, in 2007, Hall listed the house for sale for almost $2.5 million. In 2014, it was acquired for $1.96 million.

On August 27, 2025, Hall married her former boss Oliver North in a private ceremony in Virginia, after the two reunited following the funeral of North's wife.

== General and cited references ==
- Hall, North Trial Testimony, 3/22/89, pp. 5311–16, and 3/23/89, pp. 5373–80, 5385–87; Chapter 5 Fawn Hall 147
- Final Report of the Independent Counsel for Iran/Contra Matters Volume I - Investigations and Prosecutions: Lawrence E. Walsh, Independent Counsel, August 4, 1993; Washington, D.C.
