= 2021 Nicaraguan general election =

- 7 November 2021
- Presidential election
- Turnout: 65.26% (Note: 65.26% was the official turnout reported by the Nicaraguan government's Supreme Electoral Council. However, the independent election observer Urnas Abiertas (Open Ballot Boxes) estimated the turnout to only be 18.5%, according to an analysis by 1,450 poll-watchers at 563 voting centers across Nicaragua.)
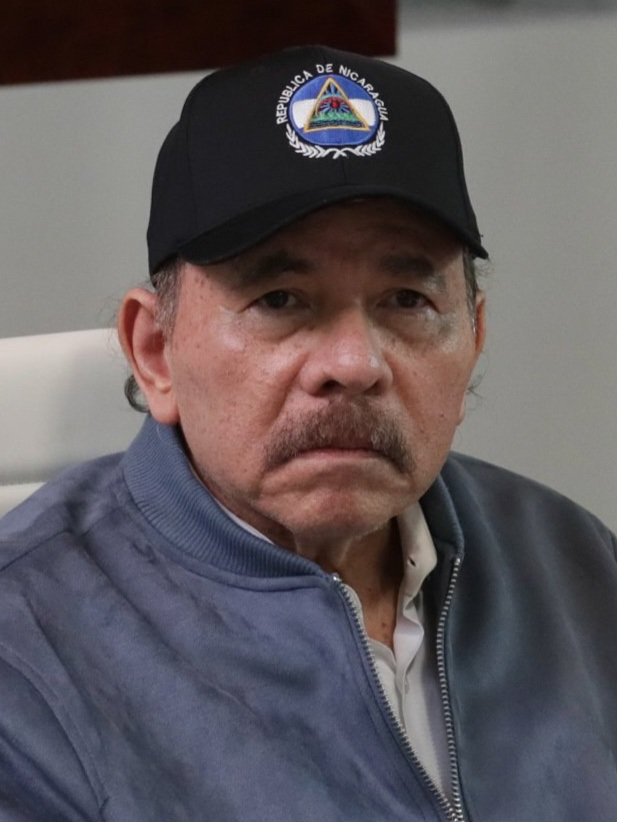

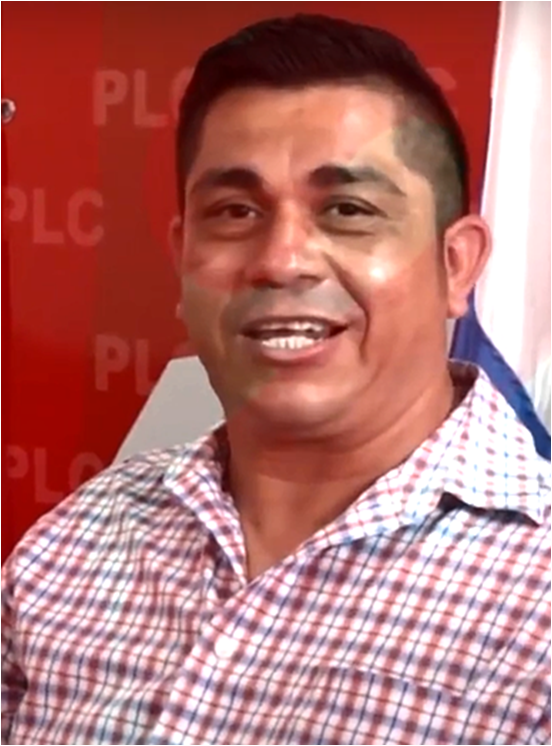
Nominee	Daniel Ortega	Walter Espinoza
Party	FSLN	PLC
Running mate	Rosario Murillo	Mayra Argüello
Popular vote	2,093,834	395,406
Percentage	75.87%	14.33%
- Results by department Ortega: 60–70% 70–80% 80–90%
President before election
Daniel Ortega
FSLN
Elected President
Daniel Ortega
FSLN
- Parliamentary election
- 90 of the 91 seats in the National Assembly; 46 seats needed for a majority
Party	Leader	Vote %	Seats	+/–
FSLN	Daniel Ortega	74.17	75	+4
PLC	María Haydeé Osuna	9.45	9	−5
ALN	Saturnino Cerrato	5.10	2	0
PLI	José del Carmen Alvarado	4.67	1	−1
APRE	Carlos José Canales	4.65	1	0
CCN	Guillermo Osorno	1.96	1	New
YATAMA	Brooklyn Rivera	–	1	0
This lists parties that won seats. See the complete results below.
President of the National Assembly before	President of the National Assembly after
Gustavo Porras Cortés; FSLN	Gustavo Porras Cortés; FSLN

General elections were held in Nicaragua on 7 November 2021 to elect the President, the National Assembly and members of the Central American Parliament. These were the last elections held before Ortega's abolition of elections in Nicaragua in 2026, citing a perceived need to form a "wall" against opposition movements.

President Daniel Ortega of the Sandinista National Liberation Front sought re-election, while five opposition candidates appeared on the ballot. In early June, police arrested five other potential opposition candidates: Cristiana Chamorro Barrios, Arturo Cruz Jr., Félix Maradiaga, Juan Sebastián Chamorro and Miguel Mora. In July candidates Medardo Mairena and Noel Vidaurre were arrested, while Luis Fley and María Asunción Moreno went into exile due to threats of arrest. Critics stated that these arrests were intended to prevent the opposition candidates from running against Ortega.

The deadline for candidates to register was 2 August 2021. On 6 August the small party Citizens for Liberty (CxL) was disqualified from running by the Supreme Electoral Council after a complaint by the right-wing Constitutionalist Liberal Party (PLC), the largest opposition party in parliament, because the leadership of a party by someone holding dual Nicaraguan-US citizenship is illegal. As a result PLC presidential candidate Milton Arcia resigned in protest, claiming the PLC was still under the influence of disgraced former president Arnoldo Alemán. On 3 August CxL vice-presidential candidate Berenice Quezada had been placed under house arrest and disqualified from running, charged with inciting violence, provocation and conspiracy to commit terrorist acts.

The elections were described as a sham by the European Union, the Organization of American States, the United States, the Community of Latin American and Caribbean States, and some independent election observers and human rights groups, due to the intimidation, detention and disqualification of opposition journalists and politicians, since in their view these actions secured victory for Ortega and his allies.

== Electoral system ==
The president was elected using first-past-the-post voting.

The 90 elected members of the National Assembly were elected by two methods; 20 members were elected from a single nationwide constituency, whilst 70 members were elected from 17 multi-member constituencies ranging in size from 2 to 19 seats. Both types of seats were elected by closed list proportional representation with no electoral threshold. A further two seats were reserved for the runner-up in the presidential election and the outgoing president (or their vice president).

Lists of candidates for the National Assembly and to the Central American Parliament must have an equal number of "male" and "female" candidates (the law specifying this does not define either term).

== Presidential candidates ==
Party or alliance	Sandinista National Liberation Front	Constitutionalist Liberal Party	Nicaraguan Party of the Christian Path	Alliance for the Republic	Independent Liberal Party	Nicaraguan Liberal Alliance
Party or alliance	FSLN	PLC	CCN	APRE	PLI	ALN
Candidate	Daniel Ortega	Walter Espinoza	Guillermo Osorno	Gerson Gutiérrez	Mauricio Orué	Carlos Mesa
Candidate	Daniel Ortega	Walter Espinoza	Guillermo Osorno	Gerson Gutiérrez	Mauricio Orué	Marcelo Montiel

=== Individuals withdrawing, arrested or disqualified ===
Several prominent individuals did not participate in the election, including PLC presidential candidate Milton Arcia, who resigned in protest at his party's actions in getting the CxL party banned and was replaced by Walter Espinoza, former Contra leader Luis Fley who left the country to avoid arrest, and YATAMA activist George Henriquez, who withdrew from his party. Individuals arrested included farmers leader Medardo Mairena, who had previously been convicted of the July 2018 terrorist attack on the Morrito police station which left four police and one civilian dead, journalist Miguel Mora, who was found guilty of inciting the arson attack on Radio Ya in May 2018, and has called for a "Panama-style" invasion of Nicaragua by the U.S., political scientist Félix Maradiaga, economist Juan Sebastián Chamorro, media owner Cristiana Chamorro Barrios, who was accused of transferring $7m from her non-profit organisation to her personal bank account, and former Contra, Ambassador to the United States and now academic Arturo Cruz Jr.

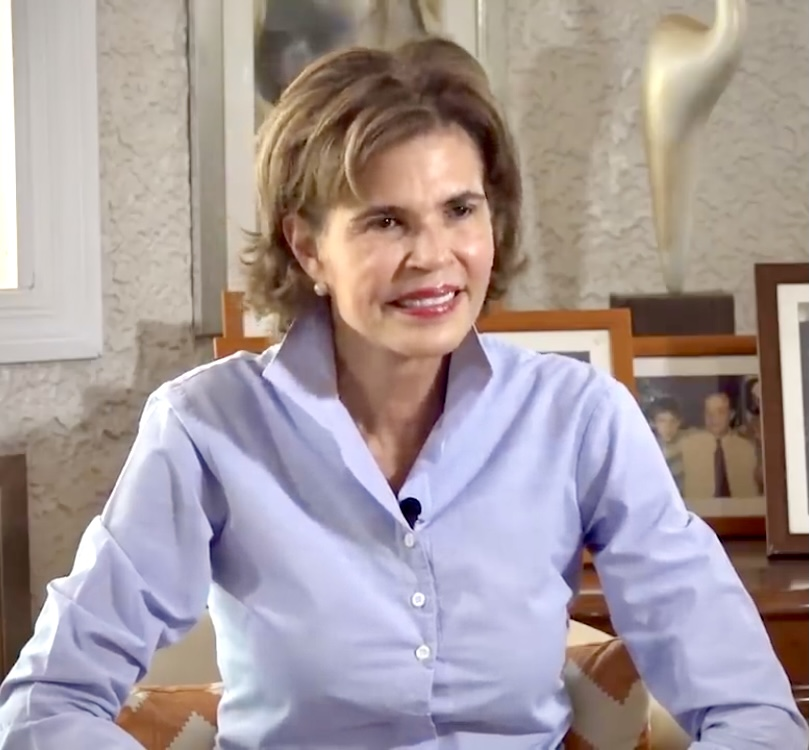
Cristiana Chamorro Barrios (arrested)

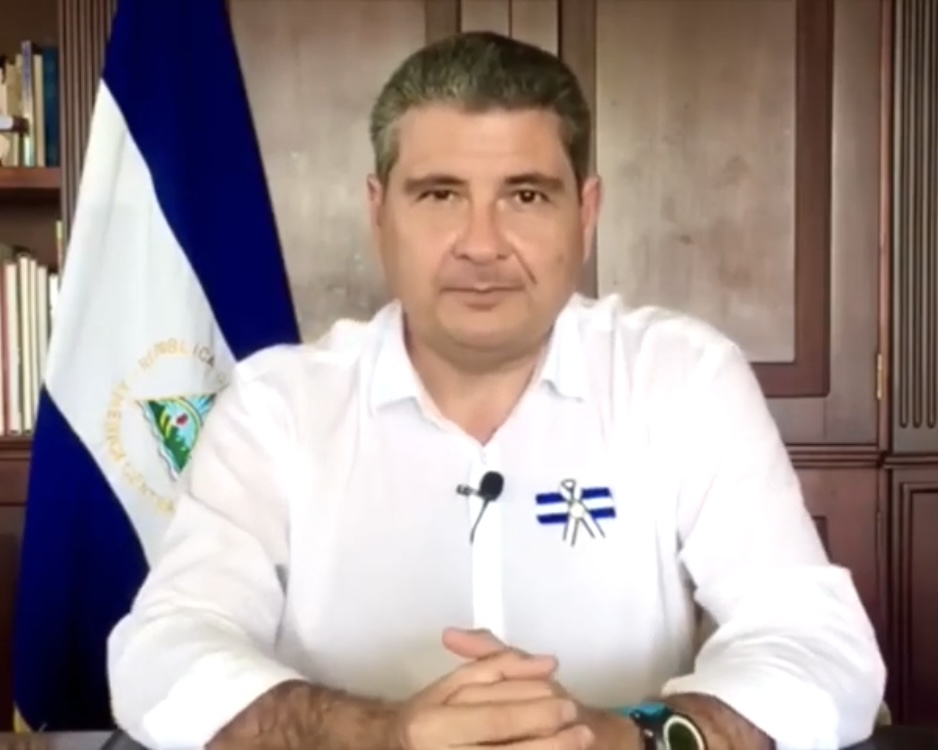
Juan Sebastián Chamorro (arrested)

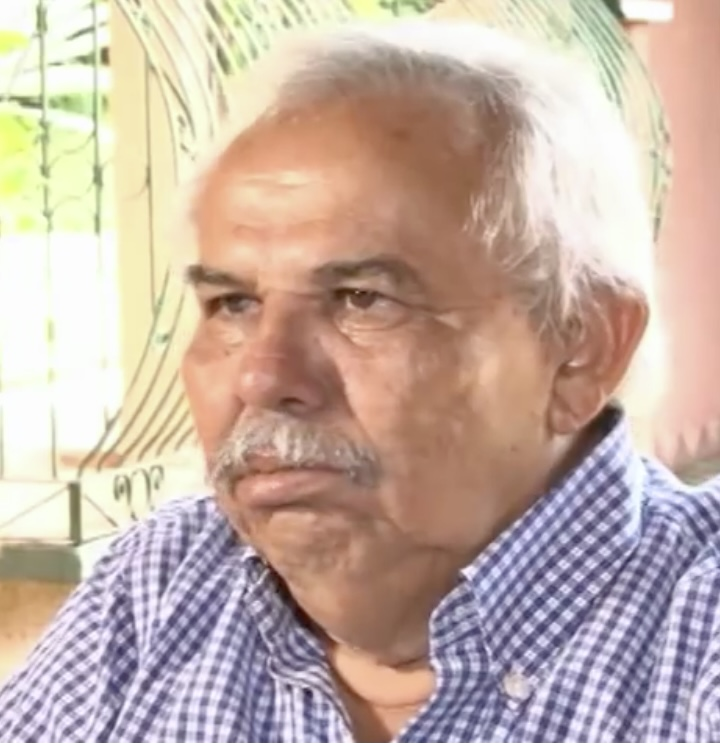
Milton Arcia (resigned)

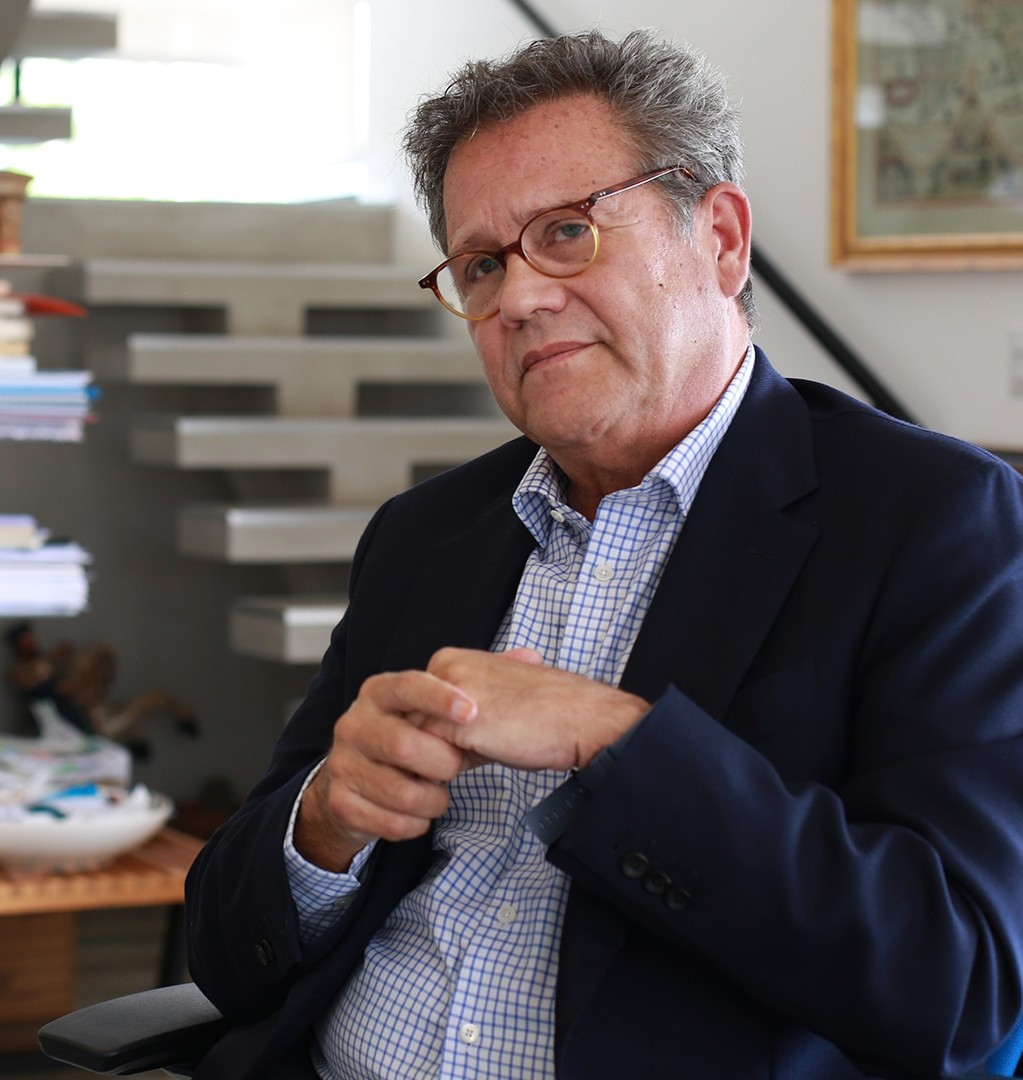
Arturo Cruz Jr. (arrested)

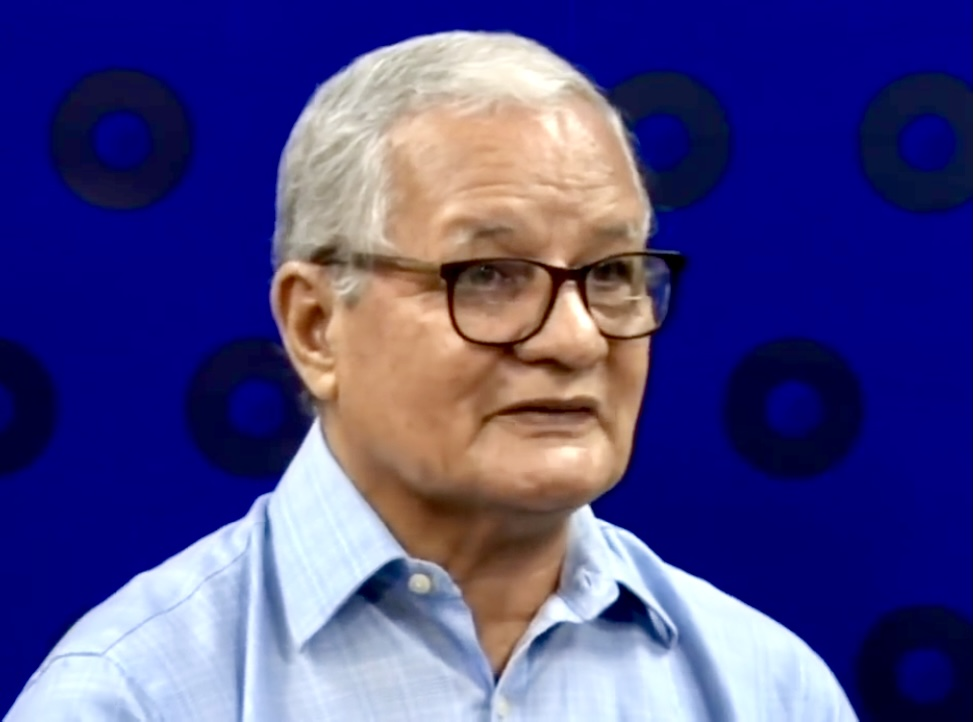
Luis Fley (left country)

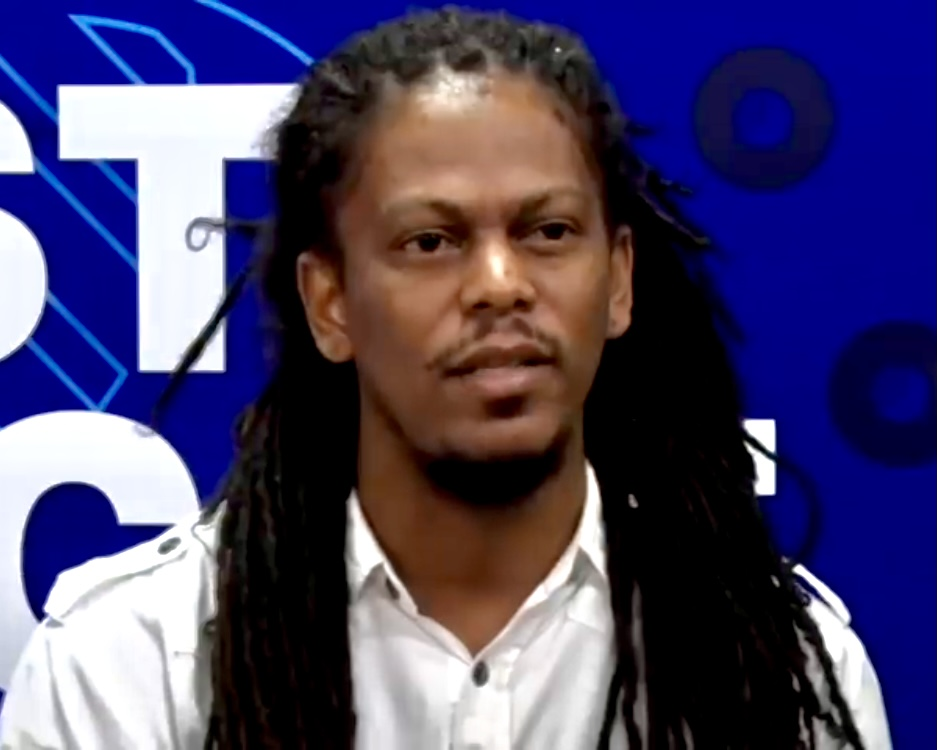
George Henriquez (lost party nomination)

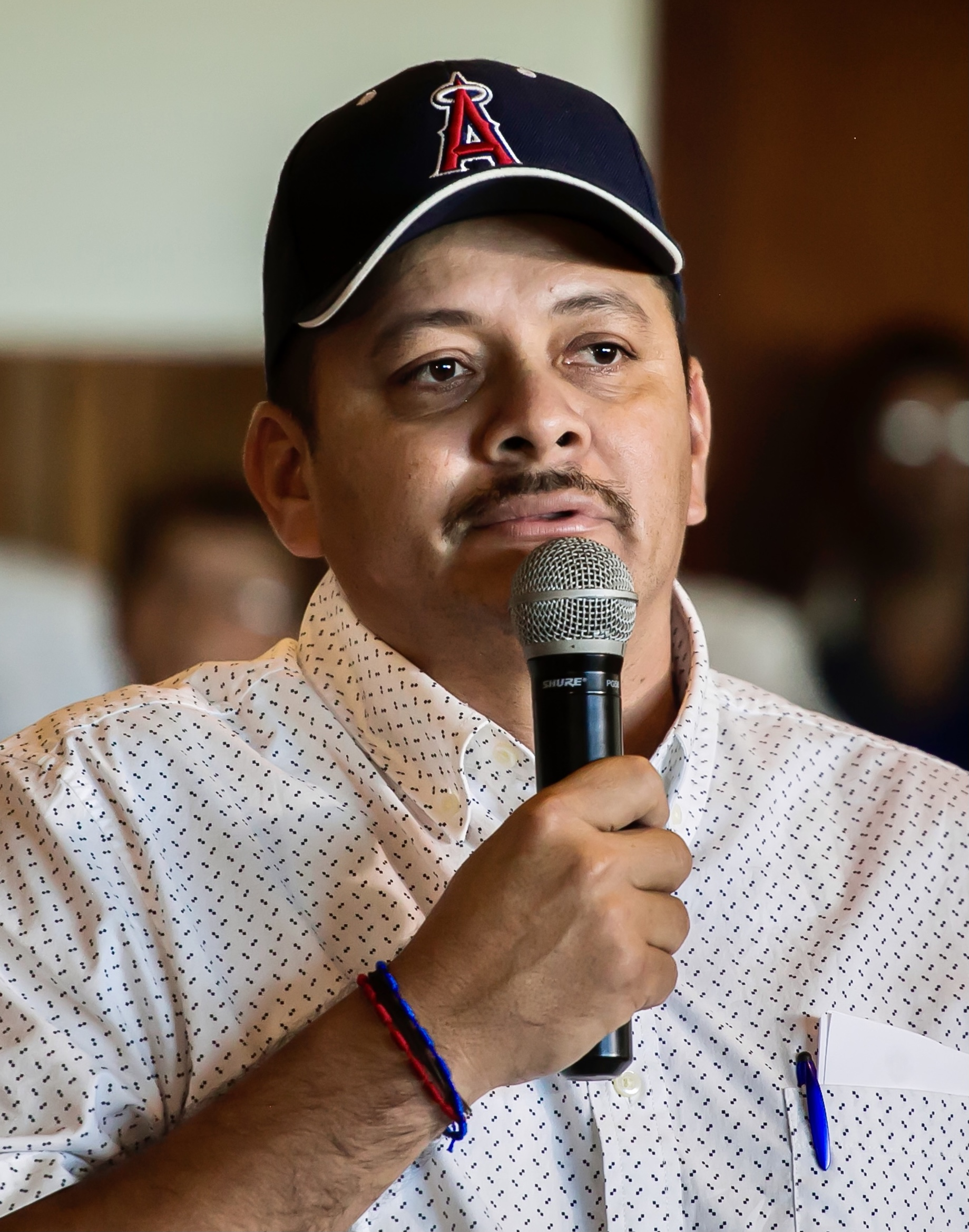
Medardo Mairena (arrested)

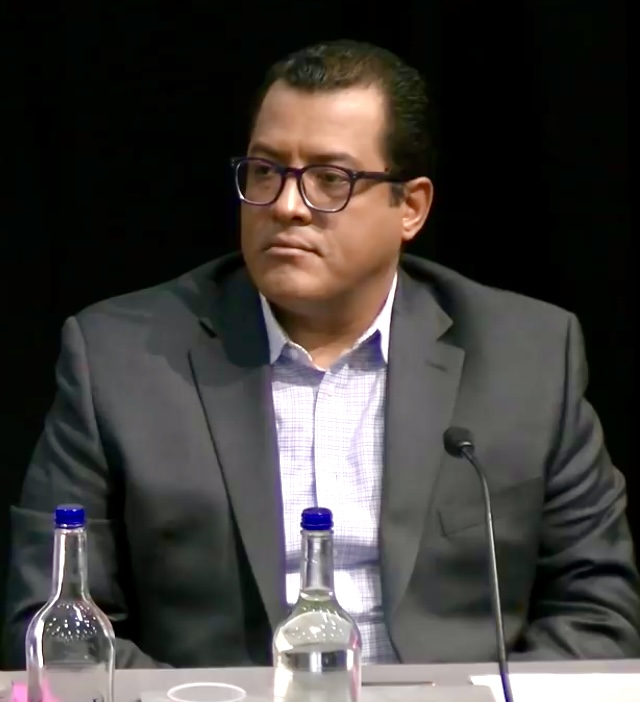
Félix Maradiaga (arrested)

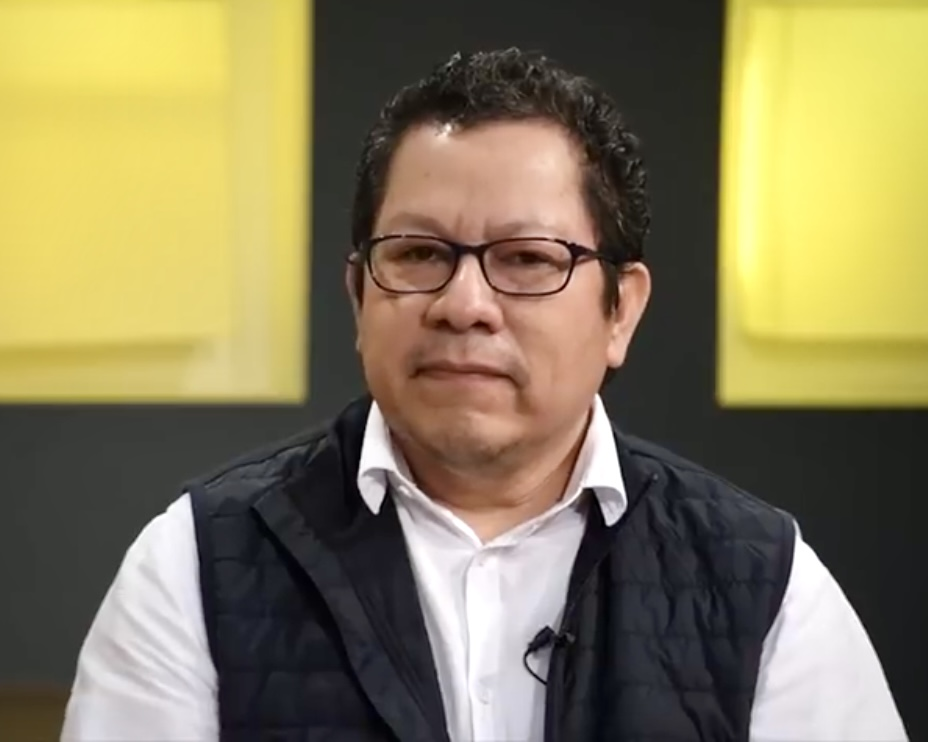
Miguel Mora (arrested)

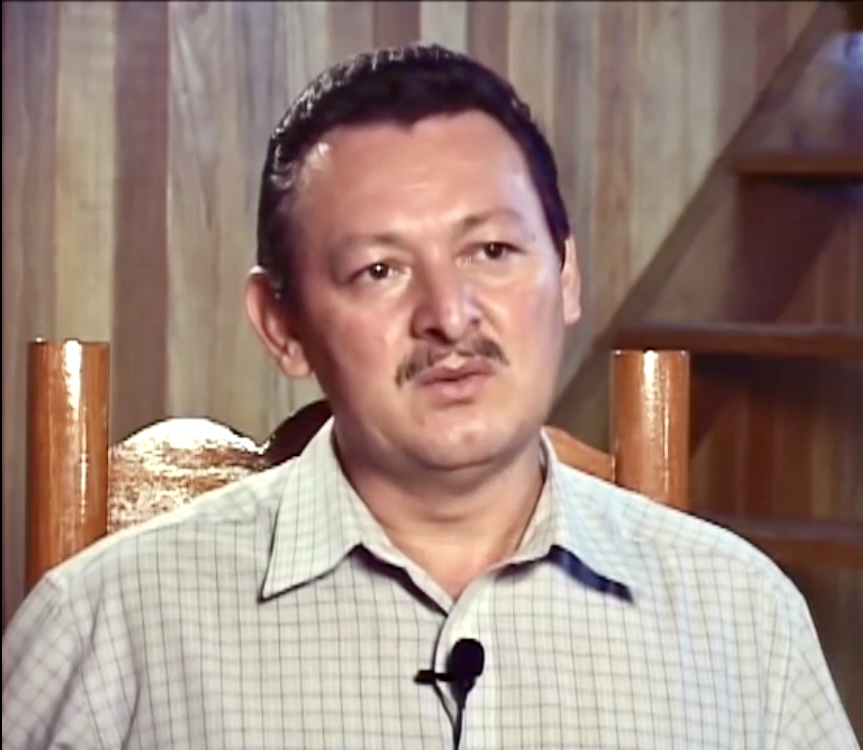
Oscar Sobalvarro (party suspended)

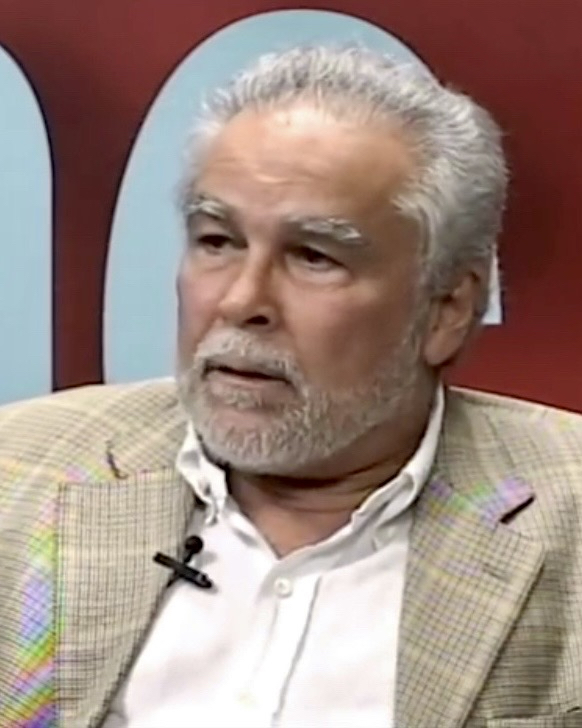
Noel Vidaurre (arrested)

== Campaign ==
=== Lead-up to campaign ===
In May 2021 a CID-Gallup poll (a small polling organisation linked to the opposition with no connection with the well-known international Gallup group) reported 33% support for the incumbent president.

In May Nicaragua's Supreme Electoral Council revoked the legal status of the small opposition party Democratic Restoration Party (PRD).

The same week the government opened an investigation into Cristiana Chamorro's work at the Violeta Barrios de Chamorro Foundation, alleging money laundering, which threatened to disqualify her candidacy as people under investigation are barred from running. The day Chamorro was called in for questioning, the police also raided the news offices of her brother Carlos's media channel, Confidencial, confiscating equipment and arresting a cameraman. Chamorro subsequently announced she would join the primary, alongside seven other candidates, for the conservative Citizens for Liberty party, the only remaining opposition party legally qualified to field a candidate in the November 2021 election, after the PRD's disqualification. The Ortega government then announced she was disqualified from running; the Secretary General for the Organization of American States, Luis Almagro, issued a statement saying: "Actions like this remove all political credibility from the government and the organizers of the electoral process." On 2 June the government raided Chamorro's house and detained her 15 minutes before she was scheduled to give a press conference. Almagro criticized the arrest.

On 5 June the government arrested another potential candidate, Arturo Cruz. He was detained for allegations he “attacked Nicaraguan society and the rights of the people” in violation of Law No. 1055, enacted in December 2020, the “law for the defense of the rights of the people to independence, sovereignty, and self-determination for peace”, called the “Guillotine Law” by critics.

On 8 June the government arrested a third potential candidate, Félix Maradiaga, a leader of the Blue and White National Unity (UNAB) opposition group. Later the same day they arrested economist Juan Sebastián Chamorro, cousin of Cristiana and the fourth pre-candidate to be detained.

On 13 June five more opposition leaders were arrested. These included four members of the leadership of the left-wing Unamos party consisting of former FSLN activists: party president Suyen Barahona.

On 15 June the Permanent Council of the Organization of American States issued a statement saying it “unequivocally condemns the arrest, harassment and arbitrary restriction imposed on potential presidential candidates, political parties and independent media outlets" and called for “the immediate release of potential candidates and all political prisoners.” A large majority of member states (26) endorsed the statement; however, Mexico and Argentina did not sign onto the resolution.

On 20 June the government arrested Miguel Mora, a pre-candidate who had been affiliated with the PRD. Following Mora's arrest, Mexico and Argentina jointly recalled their ambassadors from Nicaragua for consultation, citing “the worrying political-legal actions carried out by the Nicaraguan government in recent days that have put at risk the integrity and freedom of various opposition figures (including presidential candidates), Nicaraguan activists and businessmen”.

Peasant leader Medardo Mairena was arrested on the night of 5 July 2021, the sixth pre-candidate to be detained and one of roughly two dozen opposition and civic leaders detained by the Ortega government since the beginning of June 2021. Two other peasant leaders and two student leaders were also arrested that night. Like most of those already arrested, they are accused of violations of Law 1055, “performing acts that undermine independence, sovereignty, and self-determination“. All detained have been sentenced to 90 days of preventative detention.

On 9 July law professor and Civic Alliance attorney María Asunción Moreno announced her intention to register as a pre-candidate with the CxL. The following day, she received a summons from the government, and, following information that she would be arrested, went into hiding. She later went into exile.

On 12 July Luis Fley confirmed he had gone into exile in response to “threats from the dictatorship to arrest me”. He also withdrew his candidacy, saying that with so many candidates jailed the election was already compromised and his continued candidacy would only play into Ortega's hand.

Kitty Monterrey, president of the CxL, announced the two primary candidates would be Noel Vidaurre and Américo Treminio. However, businessman and former Contra commander and CxL vice-president Oscar Sobalvarro was added to the list on 24 July.

Later on 24 July the government announced the investigation and then the arrest of ACxL pre-candidate Noel Vidaurre, who had challenged Ortega in previous elections. As with most of the other candidates, Vidaurre was accused of violating Law 1055, committing “treason to the homeland”. He was held in police custody at his home. Political commentator Jaime Arellano was detained the same day.

=== Official campaigning and candidates ===
The deadline for candidates to register was 2 August 2021.

On 3 August CxL vice-presidential candidate Berenice Quezada was placed under house arrest and barred from running on charges of "apology for crime and incitement to hatred" following campaign statements allegedly sympathizing with the 2018–2021 Nicaraguan protests. The Guardian reported that "She was the eighth contender in the election to be arrested since May. The other seven candidates and about two dozen opposition leaders have been arrested on vague treason charges. Most of those arrested in the crackdown are being held incommunicado, at undisclosed locations and with no access to lawyers."

On 6 August, following a complaint from Constitutionalist Liberal Party (PCL) board and its president María Haydee Osuna that CxL president Kitty Monterrey was a dual national, the Supreme Electoral Council cancelled the legal status of the CxL and instructed the relevant administrative body to revoke Monterrey's national identity card. Arcia, the PLC's candidate, resigned in protest at the PLC's role in the events; he was immediately replaced by PLC National Assembly deputy Walter Espinoza. On 11 August the PLC vice-presidential nominee María Dolores Moncada resigned, refusing to continue on the ticket with Espinoza.

In September the United Nations High Commissioner for Human Rights Michelle Bachelet and the Inter-American Commission on Human Rights made statements criticising the detention of opposition activists. Family members of detained activists including would-be candidate Juan Sebastián Chamorro and opposition activists Víctor Tinoco, Tamara Dávila and Lesther Alemán told the press of their poor treatment, including isolation and lack of access to health care. Also in September a warrant was issued for the arrest of Sergio Ramírez, a former Sandinista activist and then MRS activist, who escaped into exile in Costa Rica.

A group of South American and Spanish communist Ortega and Murillo supporters were invited as "electoral accompaniers", appointed by the Supreme Electoral Council on 28 September. The Organization of American States (OAS) appointed former Costa Rican president Luis Guillermo Solís as head of the official Electoral Observation mission. On 19 October 2021 Minister of Foreign Affairs Denis Moncada stated that the government would not invite the OAS mission, accusing them of being participants in the 2019 Bolivian political crisis. Moncada also said that "[the election] will count on the free participation of legally constituted political parties, which have legal personality and are participating individually or in alliance". Along with Cuba and Venezuela, Nicaragua was ranked in August 2021 as one of the countries with the worst electoral observation index in the region.

In October a poll by the opposition-aligned Gallup-CID claimed that support for Ortega had dropped to 19%, while M&R, a polling company contracted by the governing party, claimed Ortega's popular support to be at nearly 80%.

On 3 November 2021 the Nicaraguan newspaper Confidencial claimed that President Ortega had banned the entry of foreign press to the country to cover the elections, because over the previous few days several journalists had been refused entry by immigration authorities.

A week before the vote the president declared that his wife, Vice President Rosario Murillo, was henceforth the “co-president” of the country, a term with no legal definition in Nicaragua.

== Conduct ==
On election day there were several protest marches and demonstrations against the elections by Nicaraguans living overseas. In Costa Rica, thousands of Nicaraguan citizens marched through the main streets of the capital San José, considering them to be a "circus and an electoral fraud". The march started at the Statue of León Cortés located in the center of the city and ended at the Plaza de la Democracia. Another group of demonstrators headed towards the Nicaraguan embassy. In the United States, protests took place in Washington, D.C., chanting slogans such as "Democracy YES, Dictatorship NO" and carrying banners such as "Viva Nicaragua Libre". The demonstrators went to protest in front of the Nicaraguan embassy and then headed towards the headquarters of the OAS to ask international organization not to recognize the election results. Another march took place in Miami, where Nicaraguan demonstrators gathered at the Plaza Rubén Darío to protest, marching to the Nicaraguan consulate general displaying banners such as "If he doesn't leave, we'll take him out". Protests were also registered in several other American cities and states, including Los Angeles, New York City, Houston and Colorado. A march also took place in Madrid, Spain.

The first polling stations opened at 06:38 in Managua, and one of the first to vote was Moncada. There were 3,160 polling stations prepared for the election day. The polls closed at 18:00, with no significant incidents.

== Results ==
=== President ===
In the early hours of 8 November, the president of the Supreme Electoral Council Brenda Rocha reported that with 49.25% of the votes counted, Daniel Ortega's Sandinista Front was winning the elections, obtaining 74.99% of the votes cast with a 65.3% turnout. An organization called Urnas Abiertas (Open Ballot Boxes), with known opposition links, estimated that the turnout was much lower than the official results, at only 18.5%, according to an analysis by 1,450 poll-watchers at 563 voting centers across Nicaragua. However, the thousands of official poll watchers from the six opposition parties did not support this claim.

Candidate	Running mate	Party	Votes	%
Daniel Ortega	Rosario Murillo	Sandinista National Liberation Front	2,093,834	75.87
Walter Espinoza	Mayra Argüello	Constitutionalist Liberal Party	395,406	14.33
Guillermo Osorno	Violeta Martínez	Nicaraguan Party of the Christian Path	89,853	3.26
Marcelo Montiel	Jennyfer Espinoza	Nicaraguan Liberal Alliance	85,711	3.11
Gerson Gutiérrez	Claudia Romero	Alliance for the Republic	48,429	1.75
Mauricio Orué	Zobeyda Rodríguez	Independent Liberal Party	46,510	1.69
Total			2,759,743	100.00

=== National Assembly ===
Party	National			Constituency			Total seats
Party	Votes	%	Seats	Votes	%	Seats	Total seats
Sandinista National Liberation Front	2,039,717	74.17	15	2,024,598	73.29	60	75
Constitutionalist Liberal Party	259,789	9.45	2	411,101	14.88	7	9
Nicaraguan Liberal Alliance	140,199	5.10	1	99,335	3.60	1	2
Independent Liberal Party	128,520	4.67	1	69,523	2.52	0	1
Alliance for the Republic	127,997	4.65	1	49,172	1.78	0	1
Nicaraguan Party of the Christian Path	53,959	1.96	0	82,844	3.00	1	1
YATAMA				25,718	0.93	1	1
Reserved seat							1
Total	2,750,181	100.00	20	2,762,291	100.00	70	91

=== Central American Parliament ===
Party	Votes	%	Seats	+/–
Sandinista National Liberation Front	2,033,231	74.17	15	0
Constitutionalist Liberal Party	258,433	9.43	2	–1
Nicaraguan Liberal Alliance	139,804	5.10	1	0
Independent Liberal Party	128,421	4.68	1	0
Alliance for the Republic	127,838	4.66	1	+1
Nicaraguan Party of the Christian Path	53,676	1.96	0	New
Total	2,741,403	100.00	20	0

== Reactions ==
=== International ===
- European Union: The High Representative of the Union for Foreign Affairs and Security Policy Josep Borrell, in a written statement, stated that the EU considers Ortega's reelection to lack "legitimacy" because the elections were held "without democratic guarantees". At the same time, it urged the Nicaraguan president to immediately release all political prisoners and to "return the sovereignty of Nicaragua to the Nicaraguan people".
- Organization of American States: The Organization of American States voted to condemn the elections, saying they "were not free, fair or transparent, and lack democratic legitimacy.” Twenty five member states voted in favor of the resolution, seven abstained, and only one, Nicaragua, voted against the resolution.
- ALBA-TCP: The integration bloc of 10 countries of Latin America and the Caribbean issued a communiqué in which it welcomed the reelection of President Daniel Ortega and Vice President Rosario Murillo, and congratulated the legislators elected to the Nicaraguan National Assembly and the Central American Parliament. It also recognized the economic, social and political achievements made by the Sandinista Revolution, which they claim has allowed strengthening better conditions for the progress of Nicaragua.
- Argentina: Following the election, the Argentine Ministry of Foreign Affairs released a statement raising concerns over the arrest of opposition leaders and the respect for the human rights of all Nicaraguans.
- Bolivia: The Ministry of Foreign Affairs of Bolivia issued the communiqué "greeting the brother Nicaraguan people for the participation and the democratic vocation in the electoral process of 7 November 2021". It also expressed its "conviction, that with majority participation and respect for the popular vote, democracy is strengthened, as the full exercise of the sovereignty of the people".
- Colombia: Colombian President Iván Duque declared that the Colombian government will not be recognizing the elections in Nicaragua and called for the General Assembly of the Organization of American States to establish a common position on the matter.
- Costa Rica: On the same day of the elections, Costa Rican President Carlos Alvarado published a tweet in which he did not recognize the result of the Nicaraguan elections because of "their lack of democratic conditions and guarantees" and called on the international community to "promote the democratic process" in that country.
- Cuba: President Miguel Díaz-Canel congratulated Ortega on his re-election, saying that the elections held in Nicaragua “were a demonstration of sovereignty and civility in the face of the cruel media campaign”. He reiterated that his government will continue to support Nicaragua.
- Peru: The government of Peru released a statement saying that the election does not "meet the minimum criteria for free, fair and transparent elections established by the Democratic Charter", and has called for the international community to reject the results.
- Russia: The Russian Minister of Foreign Affairs Sergey Lavrov described the calls by Western countries not to recognize the election results "unacceptable", as he considers that the voting was done "in accordance with the law".
- Spain: The Spanish government stated that it "refuses to give credibility and legitimacy to the results that may derive from this process", adding that they are a "mockery" and demanded that "all arbitrarily imprisoned political prisoners and demonstrators be released immediately and unconditionally and that their judicial processes be annulled [...] and that it complies with the international commitments contracted in the field of Human Rights".
- Republic of China (Taiwan): The Ministry of Foreign Affairs of the Republic of China on Taiwan said they will promote cooperation with the new government of Nicaragua.
- United States: The White House published a statement in which President Joe Biden accused the elections of being a "pantomime" and that they "[were] neither free nor fair, and most certainly not democratic". He also called for the "regime to take immediate steps to restore democracy in Nicaragua, and to immediately and unconditionally release those unjustly imprisoned".
- Venezuela:
  - President Nicolás Maduro congratulated in a televised statement his counterpart Daniel Ortega for the "good news" and for the "good level of participation and [...] for this day of peace, of participation".
  - Juan Guaidó, leader of the opposition and disputed president, described the elections as a "fraud" and asked the international community to reject the process.

=== Others ===
- Human Rights Watch: José Miguel Vivanco, executive director of the Americas Division of the HRW, on election day, called the voting a "sham".
- Four former Latin American presidents, Brazilian Fernando Henrique Cardoso, Costa Rican Laura Chinchilla, Chilean Ricardo Lagos and Colombian Juan Manuel Santos, alongside Secretary General of the International Institute for Democracy and Electoral Assistance, signed a letter stating that the election day was "marked by the violation of citizens' rights to freely and democratically elect their authorities", called for the suspension of Nicaragua from the OAS through the application of the Inter-American Democratic Charter to "deepen the isolation of the regime" and asked Latin American foreign ministers to "place the situation in Nicaragua as a priority issue at the next OAS General Assembly".

== See also ==
- RENACER Act
