= Bluefields Indian and Caribbean University =

University in Bluefields

- BICU
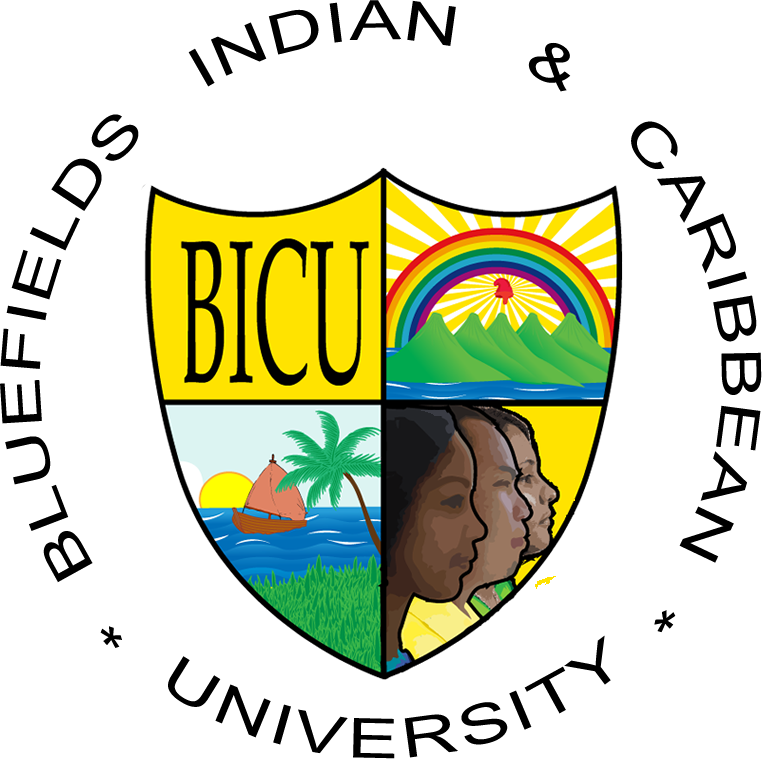
- Motto: "Education is the best option for the development of the people"
- Type: Public
- Established: 1991
- Rector: Henningston Omier Taylor
- Students: 6,479
- Postgraduates: 7,156
- Location: Bluefields, South Caribbean Coast Autonomous Region, Nicaragua; 12.006°N 83.770°W
- Website: www.bicu.edu.ni

Bluefields Indian and Caribbean University (BICU), is a university founded in 1991, in Bluefields, South Caribbean Coast Autonomous Region, Nicaragua.

== History ==
The creation of the "Bluefields Indian & Caribbean University (BICU)", or Indigenous and Caribbean University of Bluefields, was founded to provide local access higher education. Since the 1960s, a generation of coastal people from both regions shared sought better opportunities to improve their lives, families, and community through a profession at the university level. Over the decade, BICU attracted people from the coast to migrate to the Pacific of the country, particularly to León and Managua, to pursue a professional career.

In the 1980s, the number of students from the northern and southern regions who entered higher education, inside and outside the country, also developed in Bluefields and Bilwi, university extension programs of the UNAN Managua. Those who graduated tended to settle in those regions, rather than returning to their community of origin. In addition, the academic training curricula did not respond to the interests and characteristics of the communities, where cultural diversity constitutes an element of identity. In this context, efforts were made to establish a university on the Coast, but the idea did not prosper.

Under these aspirations and historical context, BICU was founded on June 6, 1991. The university primarily serves groups traditionally excluded or absorbed by the dominant cultural homogenization. With this model of university, different cultures, languages, customs, beliefs and practices converge under the principle of universality.

BICU is now part of the National Council of Universities (CNU) and has achieved legal recognition as a community and intercultural university. The allocation of a 6% constitutional allowed BICU to have its own facilities and to expand its coverage to all municipalities in the autonomous regions.

In 2000, the statutes that legitimize the university were reformed and published to strengthen internal organizational processes under democratic, pluralistic, and participatory principles. The unions that represent the raison d'etre of the university are made up of students, teachers, workers and social agents of cooperation have been consolidated.
