= Lucía Pineda Ubau =

Nicaraguan journalist (born 1973)

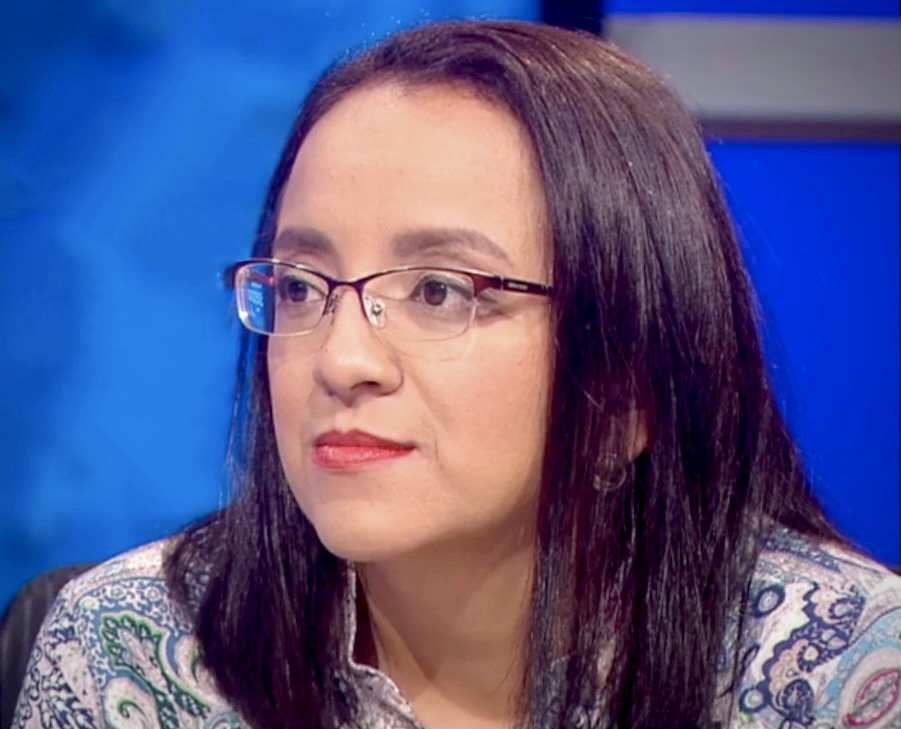
- Lucía Pineda Ubau in a 2019 interview
- Born: September 1973 (age 51–52); San Miguelito, Nicaragua
- Citizenship: Nicaragua, Costa Rica
- Occupation: Journalist
- Awards: CPJ International Press Freedom Award

Lucía Pineda Ubau (born September 1973) is a Nicaraguan-Costa Rican journalist. She is the news director of Canal 15 in Nicaragua. She was a political prisioner under Daniel Ortega's regime.

== Career ==
Pineda Ubau was born in San Miguelito, Nicaragua; her mother was from Costa Rica. In 1977, her family moved to Managua, where she studied at primary school at Colonia Morazán and at high school at the Instituto Gaspar García Laviana.

Pineda studied journalism at the Central American University (Managua). Her career started in Extravisión on Canal 4 before working for seven years at TV Noticías on Canal 2; she worked for Canal 8 until 2000.

She reported Daniel Ortega's stepdaughter on sexual abuse victim who was allegedly committed by his stepfather Daniel Ortega and the investigation into corruption in the Arnoldo Aleman regime. She received the 2018 Press Freedom Grand Prix, which was presented by the Inter-American Press Association.

She was arrested on charges of "inciting violence and hate" and "promoting terrorism". The Committee to Protect Journalists, The Coalition For Women In Journalism and Reporters Without Borders condemned her arrest and called for her immediate release. She was released from prison on Tuesday 11 June 2019 in an amnesty granted by Daniel Ortega's regime to political prisoners.

== Awards ==
- 2024, Friedrich-Ebert-Stiftung's Human Rights Prize
- 2019, Courage in Journalism Award by the International Women’s Media Foundation (IWMF)
