= Arturo Cruz Jr. =

Nicaraguan academic, diplomat and politician

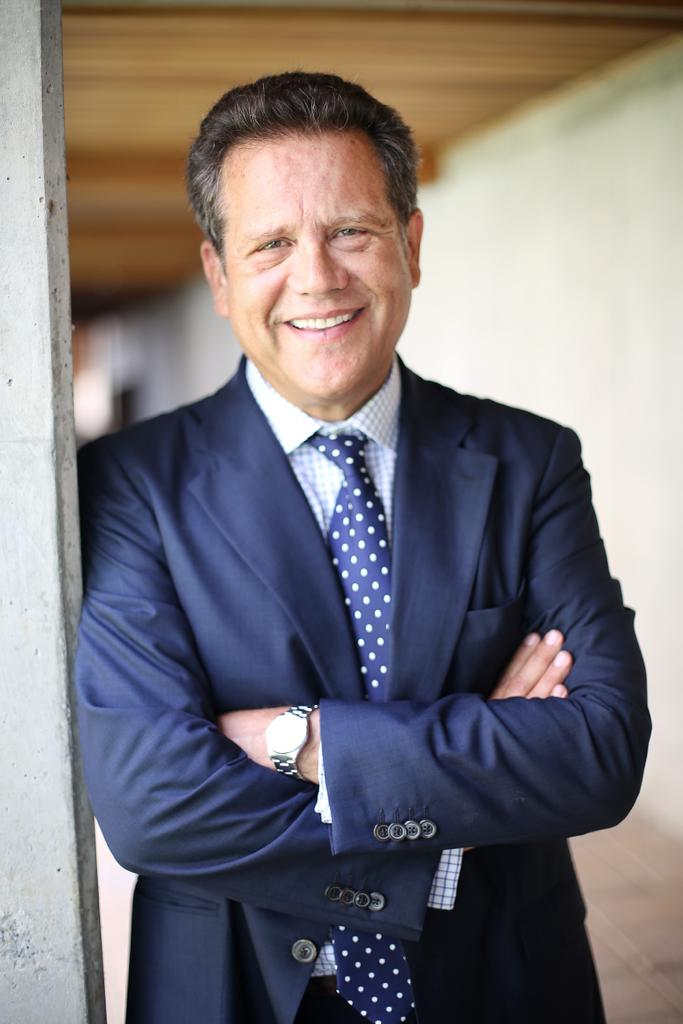
Arturo Cruz Sequeira

Arturo José Cruz Sequeira (born 1953), also known as Arturo Cruz Jr., is a Nicaraguan Contra, diplomat and professor. The son of Nicaraguan politician Arturo Cruz, he became involved in the exile politics of the Contra rebels opposing the Sandinista (FSLN) government in the 1980s, and later served as the Ambassador of Nicaragua to the United States for two years from 2007 to 2009. Prior to his ambassadorship, Cruz was a tenured professor at Instituto Centroamericano de Administración de Empresas Business School in Managua, Nicaragua, and a visiting professor at the Advanced School of Economics and Business in San Salvador, El Salvador. Cruz was a pre-candidate for president in the 2021 Nicaraguan general election. On June 5, 2021, he was arrested by the government of Daniel Ortega.

== Family and education ==
Cruz Jr. is the child of Arturo José Cruz Porras and Consuelo Sequeira Ximénez, the firstborn of seven children. He is the cousin, on his father's side, of Sandinista commandante Luis Carrión Cruz.

Cruz Jr. is a graduate of American University in Washington, D.C., has a master's degree in international relations from the Paul H. Nitze School of Advanced International Studies at Johns Hopkins University, and in the early 1990s he obtained a Doctorate in Modern History from the University of Oxford.

== Career and politics ==
As an idealistic youth, Cruz supported the Sandinistas, only to become disillusioned after they took power. In 1982 he turned to the charismatic Edén Pastora, the former Sandinista commander starting up the rebel Democratic Revolutionary Alliance, only to become disenchanted with him as well. Cruz then became involved in 1985 with the United Nicaraguan Opposition (UNO), the rebel umbrella group which his father had joined. Trips to Lieutenant Colonel Oliver North's office at the United States National Security Council brought him into contact with North's secretary, Fawn Hall, with whom he had a well-publicized relationship. After his father's resignation from UNO in March 1987, he attached himself to Aristides Sánchez. Eventually, Cruz left Contra politics, recounting his experience in Memoirs of a Counterrevolutionary (Doubleday, 1989). In a 1989 review for Los Angeles Times, Art Seidenbaum wrote that the book depicted Cruz as "almost Holden Caulfield in Nicaragua, looking for the unphony cause and the dedicated leader in a thicket of intrigue, scandal, bloodshed, family grudges and fierce egos."

On February 27, 2007, he presented his credentials as Nicaragua's Ambassador to the United States, appointed by recently elected President Daniel Ortega. He resigned his post in March 2009 and returned to his teaching position at INCAE.

A former Bradley Fellow at the Hudson Institute in Washington, D.C., Cruz’s academic focus has been the analysis of social, economic, and political trends in Latin America. His book Nicaragua’s Conservative Republic 1853–1893 was published by Palgrave Press and Saint Antony’s College in 2002. In 2003, the work was translated and published in Spanish by the Coleccion Cultural de Centro America. He is also the co-author of Varieties of Liberalism in Central America: Nation-States as Works in Progress (University of Texas Press, 2007) with Forrest Colburn. His writings and articles on Latin America and the foreign policy of the United States have also appeared in such publications as the New Republic, Commentary, New York Times, Washington Post, Los Angeles Times, and SAIS Review.

Cruz is one of the opposition pre-candidates for president in the 2021 Nicaraguan general election, enrolled with the Alliance of Citizens for Liberty (ACxL) party, which by the end of May 2021 was the only remaining opposition party with legal standing to field a candidate in the November general election. On 5 June 2021, the Ortega administration arrested Cruz. He is being detained for allegations he “attacked Nicaraguan society and the rights of the people” in violation of Law 1055, enacted in December 2021, the “law for the defense of the rights of the people to independence, sovereignty, and self-determination for peace”, called the “Guillotine Law” by critics. Cruz is the second candidate to be arrested, following the June 2 arrest of Cristiana Chamorro Barrios.
