= Félix Maradiaga =

Nicaraguan academic and opposition activist

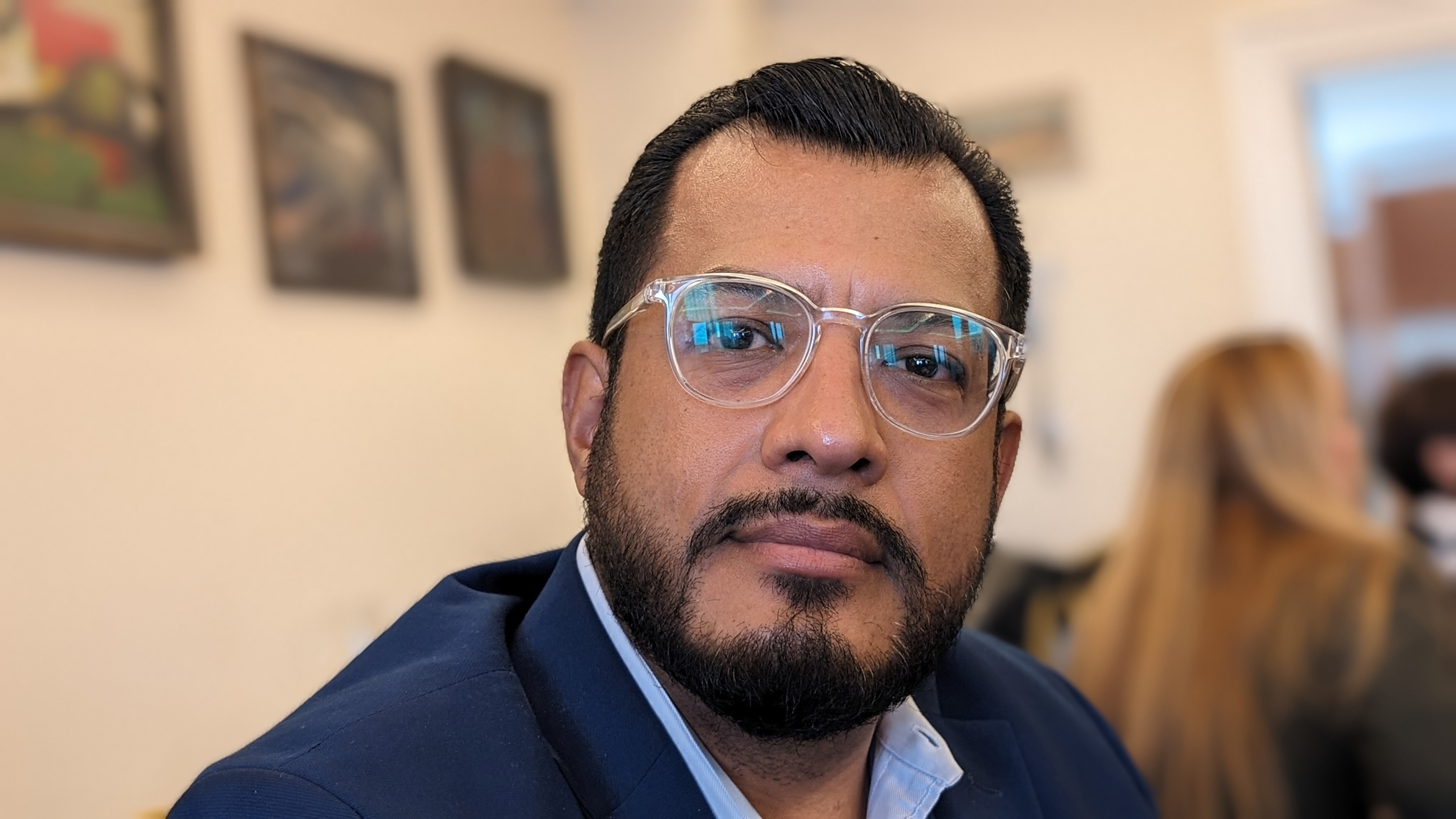
- Maradiaga in 2024
- Born: 23 September 1976 (age 50); Jinotega, Nicaragua
- Education: Harvard Kennedy School (MPA); University of Barcelona

Félix Alejandro Maradiaga Blandón (born 23 September 1976) is a Nicaraguan academic and opposition politician. He was Secretary-General of Nicaragua's Ministry of Defense from 2002 to 2006. He was a pre-candidate for president in the 2021 Nicaraguan general election and a leader of the opposition coalition Blue and White National Unity.

== Early life and career ==
Maradiaga was born in Jinotega. As a child he was an unaccompanied minor refugee in the United States during the Nicaraguan civil war. He holds a Master in Public Administration from the Harvard Kennedy School and a master's degree from the University of Barcelona. He directed the Institute of Strategic Studies and Public Policies (IEEPP), a Managua think tank.

== Political activity ==
In September 2018 Maradiaga briefed the United Nations Security Council on repression in Nicaragua. Shortly afterwards, prosecutors issued a warrant for his arrest on charges of organized crime and terrorism financing. He left the country in 2018 and returned in September 2019. On 28 February 2021 he announced his candidacy for president.

== Arrest and imprisonment ==
On 8 June 2021 Maradiaga was arrested by police after being summoned to the Public Ministry in Managua. Police said he was under investigation for "undermining independence, sovereignty and self-determination", "inciting foreign interference" and "calling for military interventions". His coalition said he was beaten during the arrest.

In March 2022 he was convicted and sentenced to 13 years in prison. According to UN Secretary-General reports, his September 2018 briefing to the Security Council was used against him. In 2022 the UN Working Group on Arbitrary Detention found his detention to be arbitrary. He spent 611 days in detention.

In February 2023 he and 221 other prisoners were released and expelled to the United States. The government revoked their Nicaraguan citizenship.

In November 2026, the Spanish government granted him Spanish nationality.
