= Luis Fley =

Nicaraguan politician and former Contra

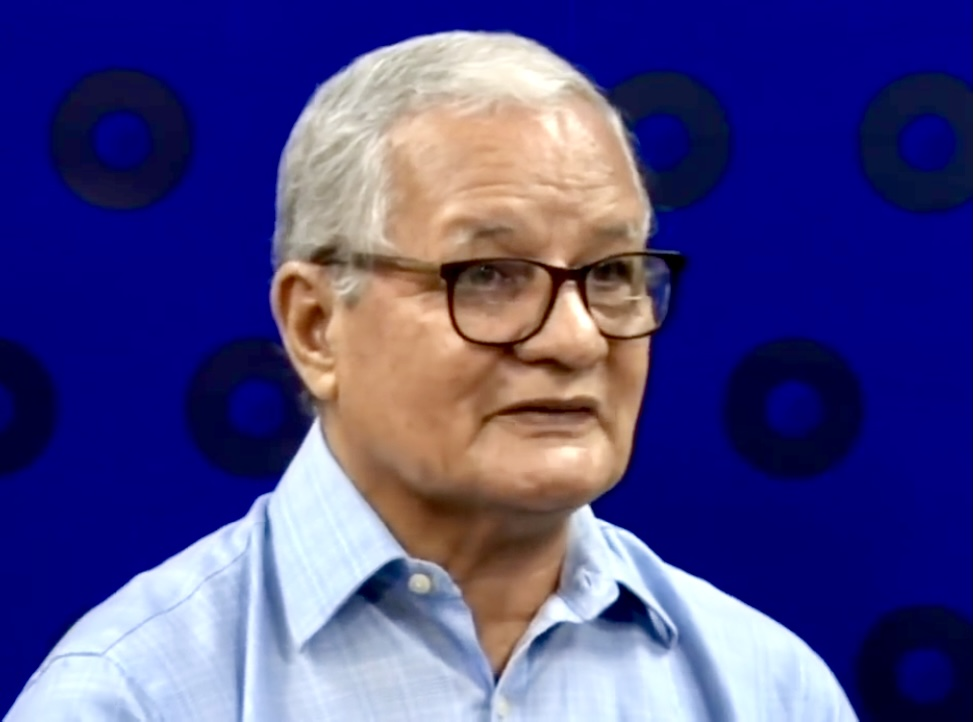
Fley in 2020

Luis Adan Fley Gonzales (born March 1951, Matagalpa) was a 2021 candidate for President of Nicaragua. He was also known as "Comandate Jhonson."

He is a former Resistance Commander, having been both a Sandinista guerilla and a Contra rebel. He has also been an agricultural technician, army officer and Member of the RN Cease-Fire Commission. Completed the third year of the agricultural high school in Matagalpa. After commanding the FSLN's Bernardino-Diaz Ochoa Column in 1978-79 against Somoza, he entered the EPS. "Jhonson" joined the Resistance on June 13, 1981. Commanded the Raul Arrioliga and Armando Blancher Task Forces, and the 15th of September Command. His family was split by the 1979 revolution and United States-backed counterrevolution, where he and three of his brothers fought on opposing sides.

== 2021 Nicaraguan general elections and exile ==
Fley was a candidate for the 2021 Nicaraguan presidential election, representing Nicaraguan Democratic Force (FDN). He is part of the National Coalition, a collection of opposition groups that have pledged to make a democratic selection of one candidate to back against incumbent Daniel Ortega. However, on 12 July, he confirmed he had gone into exile in response to “threats from the dictatorship to arrest me”. He withdrew his candidacy, saying that with so many candidates jailed the election was already compromised and his continued candidacy would only play into Ortega's hand.
