= Sin Hung =

Sin Hung may refer to:

- Sin Hung-class torpedo boat, a torpedo boat class used by the Korean People's Navy
- Sin Hunh-class hydrofoil torpedo boat, a hydrofoil boat class used by the Korean People's Navy
- Sin Hung-class patrol boat, a patrol boat class used by the Korean People's Navy
