= Nicaraguan Armed Forces =

Military forces of Nicaragua

- Fuerzas Armadas de Nicaragua (Spanish)
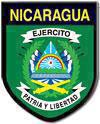
- Motto: Patria y Libertad (English: "Fatherland and Freedom")
- Founded: 1925; 101 years ago (as National Guard); 2 September 1979; 47 years ago
- Current form: 1995; 31 years ago (as the Sandinista Popular Army)
- Service branches: Army; Navy; Air Force
- Headquarters: Managua
- Website: ejercito.mil.ni

Leadership
- Supreme Commanders-in-Chiefs: Daniel Ortega; Rosario Murillo
- Minister of Defense: Rosa Adelina Barahona Castro
- Commander-in-Chief of the Army: Julio César Avilés Castillo

Personnel
- Military age: 18 years of age
- Conscription: No
- Active personnel: 45,000

Expenditure
- Budget: $32 million
- Percent of GDP: 0.9% (2012 est.)

Industry
- Domestic suppliers: Industria Militar Coronel Santos López
- Foreign suppliers: China; Cuba; Czech Republic; India; Indonesia; Iran; North Korea; Mexico; Poland; Russia; Vietnam Former: Israel; Republic of China; Ukraine

Related articles
- History: Nicaraguan Revolution
- Ranks: Nicaragua military ranks

The Nicaraguan Armed Forces (Spanish: Fuerzas Armadas de Nicaragua) are the military forces of Nicaragua. There are three branches: the Navy, the Army, and Air Force.

== History ==
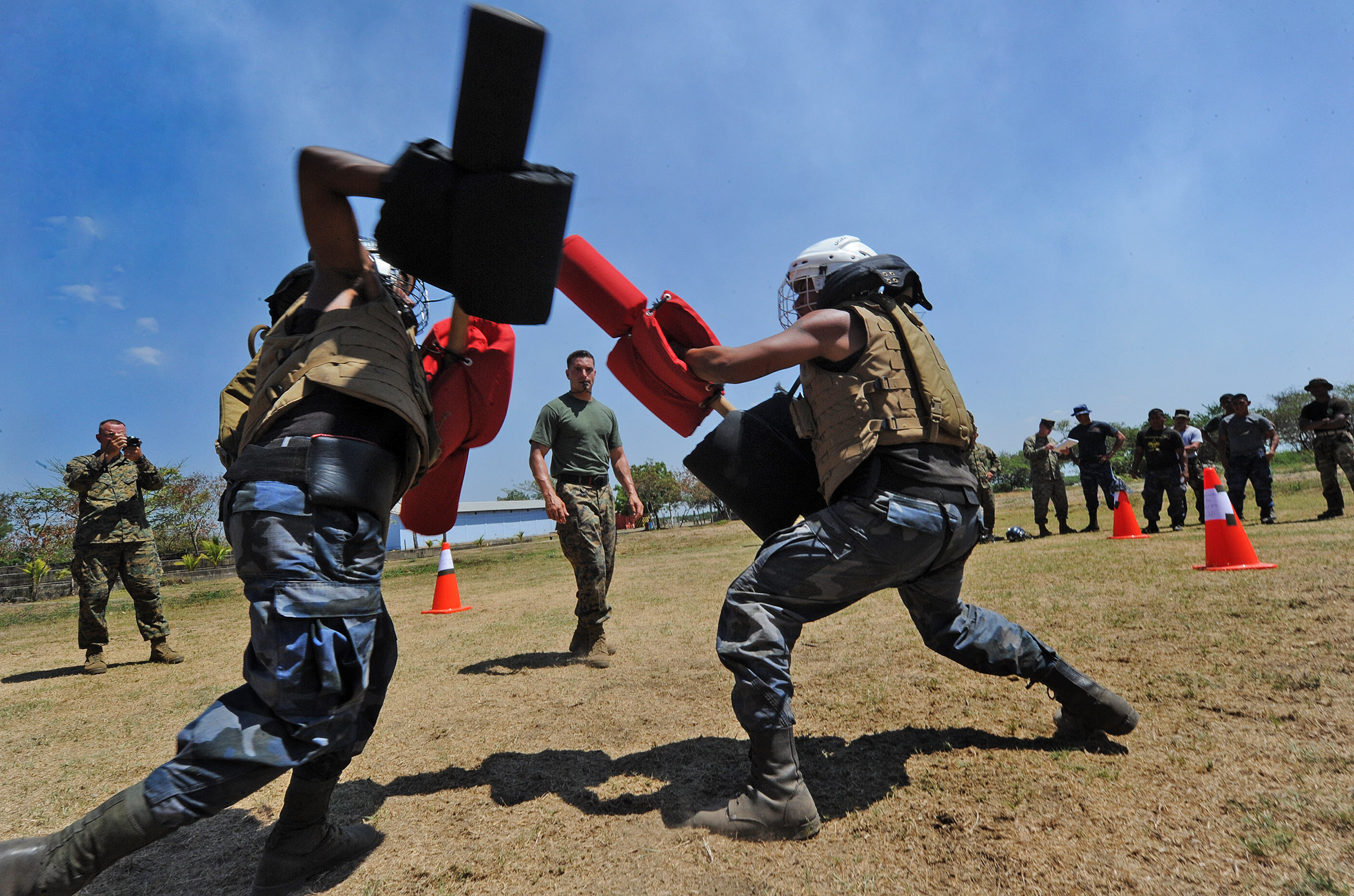
Nicaraguan military members train during a visit by the U.S. Navy

=== National Guard, 1925–1979 ===
The long years of strife between the liberal and conservative political factions and the existence of private armies led the United States to sponsor the National Guard as an apolitical institution to assume all military and police functions in Nicaragua. The marines provided the training, but their efforts were complicated by a guerrilla movement led by Augusto César Sandino. Sandino opposed the United States-backed military force, which was composed mostly of his political enemies, and continued to resist the marines and the fledgling National Guard from a stronghold in the mountainous areas of northern Nicaragua.

Upon the advent of the United States Good Neighbor Policy in 1933, the marines withdrew. Having reached a strength of about 3,000 by the mid-1930s, the guard was organized into company units, although the Presidential Guard component approached battalion size. Despite hopes for an apolitical force, however, the National Guard soon became the personal tool of the Somoza dynasty. Expanded to more than 10,000 during the civil war of 1978–79, the guard consisted of a reinforced battalion as its primary tactical unit, a Presidential Guard battalion, a mechanized company, an engineer battalion, artillery and antiaircraft batteries, and one security company in each of the country's sixteen departments.

The National Guard's main arms were rifles and machine guns, later augmented by antiaircraft guns and mortars. Although Nicaragua was not actively involved in World War II, it qualified for United States Lend-Lease military aid in exchange for U.S. base facilities at Corinto. Additional shipments of small arms and transportation and communication equipment followed, as well as some training and light transport aircraft.

United States military aid to the National Guard continued under the Rio de Janeiro Treaty of Mutual Defense (1947), but stopped in 1976 after relations with the administration of Anastasio Somoza Debayle (1967–72, 1974–79) worsened. Some United States equipment of World War II vintage was also purchased from other countries—Staghound armored cars and M4 Sherman medium tanks from Israel and F-51 Mustang fighter aircraft from Sweden. Except for minor frontier skirmishes with Honduras in 1957 over a border dispute, the National Guard was not involved in any conflict with its neighbors. The guard's domestic power, however, gradually broadened to embrace not only its original internal security and police functions but also control over customs, telecommunications, port facilities, radio broadcasting, the merchant marine, and civil aviation.

=== Military under the Sandinista government, 1979–1990 ===
To replace the National Guard, the Sandinistas established a new national army, the Sandinista Popular Army (Ejército Popular Sandinista—EPS), and a police force, the Sandinista Police (Policía Sandinista). These two groups, contrary to the original Puntarenas Pact were controlled by the Sandinistas and trained by personnel from Cuba, Eastern Europe, and the Soviet Union. Opposition to the overwhelming FSLN influence in the security forces did not surface until 1980.

Meanwhile, the EPS developed, with support from Cuba and the Soviet Union, into the largest and best equipped military force in Central America. Simultaneously, with the introduction of Patriotic Military Service (1983), a conscription system, EPS forces reached approximately 80,000 active-duty members by 1990. Patriotic Military Service required males, ranging in age from seventeen to twenty-six, to serve four years in the military (two years active duty and two years in the reserves). This conscription system did not require women to enlist; however, they could do so voluntarily.

The Patriotic Military Service system was an extremely unpopular initiative taken by the Sandinista government. Draft dodging was rampant as young men fled the country in order to avoid conscription. Additionally, massive demonstrations and antidraft protests plagued the country. The unpopularity of the draft was believed to have been a large factor in the Sandinista election defeat in 1990.

The Armed Forces performed very well in terms of human rights under the Sandinistas. Upon visiting Nicaragua, human rights organizations such as Amnesty International, Americas Watch, and the Human Rights Commission of the Organization of American States found “little evidence of the extreme types of human rights violations so common under…US-backed regimes.” These organizations were also unable to find any examples of state-sponsored death squads, use of physical torture propagated by the state, and very few disappearances/executions. Although the investigations led by human rights organizations excluded unruly soldiers acting violently on their own accord. In this context, it was discovered that the government's “usual response…was to investigate and discipline those responsible.”

=== Nicaraguan Armed Forces, 1990–1995 ===
Under an agreement between President-elect Chamorro of the National Opposition Union (Unión Nacional Oppositora – UNO) and the defeated FSLN party, General Humberto Ortega, former defense minister and commander in chief of the EPS under the Sandinistas, remained at the head of the armed forces. By a law that took effect in April 1990, the EPS became subordinate to President Chamorro as commander in chief. Chamorro also retained the Ministry of Defense portfolio.

Chamorro's authority over the EPS was very limited. There were no Ministry of Defense offices and no vice ministers to shape national defense policies or exercise civilian control over the armed forces. Under the Law of Military Organization of the Sandinista Popular Army enacted just before Chamorro's election victory, Humberto Ortega retained authority over promotions, military construction, and force deployments. He contracted for weapons procurement and drafted the military budget presented to the government. Only an overall budget had to be submitted to the legislature, thus avoiding a line-item review by the National Assembly.

Sandinista officers remained at the head of all general staff directorates and military regions. The chief of the army, Major General Joaquín Cuadra Lacayo, continued in his pre-Chamorro position. Facing domestic pressure to remove Humberto Ortega and the risk of curtailment of United States aid as long as Sandinistas remained in control of the armed forces, Chamorro announced that Ortega would be replaced in 1994. Ortega challenged her authority to relieve him and reiterated his intention to remain at the head of the EPS until the army reform program was completed in 1997. This date was later advanced to the first half of 1995.

The army reform measures were launched with deep cuts in personnel strengths, the abolition of conscription, and disbanding of the militia. The size of the army declined from a peak strength of 97,000 troops to an estimated 15,200 in 1993, accomplished by voluntary discharges and forced retirements. Under the Sandinistas, the army general staff embodied numerous branches and directorates artillery, combat readiness, communications, Frontier Guards, military construction, intelligence, counterintelligence, training, operations, organization and mobilization, personnel, and logistics. Most of these bodies appear to have been retained, although they have been trimmed and reorganized. The Nicaraguan Air Force and Navy were also subordinate to the army general staff.

Since 1990 the mission of the EPS has been to ensure the security of the national borders and to deal with internal disturbances. Its primary task has been to prevent disorder and violence wrought by armed bands of former Contra and Sandinista soldiers.

In November and December 1992, the EPS was deployed alongside the National Police to prevent violence during demonstrations by the National Workers' Front for improved pay and benefits. The EPS and the Frontier Guards also assist the police in narcotics control. A small EPS contingent works alongside demobilized Contras in a Special Disarmament Brigade to reduce the arsenal of weapons in civilian hands.

=== National Army of Nicaragua, 1995–2006 ===
In 1995, the National Army of Nicaragua (Ejército de Nicaragua), having never previously been fully apolitical evolved, through constitutional reforms, into a more traditional Central American military. As ties to the FSLN weakened, military leaders turned over power regularly without “fuss,” refrained from becoming involved in the political realm, and the overall size of the military significantly decreased.

=== National Army of Nicaragua, 2006–present ===
Under President Ortega, multiple changes have occurred strengthening FSLN control over the national military. During 2010, the national assembly “passed changes that allowed [the] politicization of the country’s security forces, while expanding these agencies’ domestic powers.” This change effectively erased the shift towards being an apolitical force from 1995 to 2006. Then in 2014, President Ortega supported a constitutional reform removing the defense and governance ministries “from the security forces’ chain of command, reducing oversight and leaving [President] Ortega in charge of appointing military and police commanders.” This action enhanced President Ortega’s political and personal control over the nation’s security forces and personnel.

President Ortega has also strengthened his ability to control the general population through two different national security initiatives. In 2015, the Sovereign Security Law, “erased barriers between internal and external security, and gave the Ortega government wide discretion to use coercion against any person or entity deemed a threat to the state, society, or economy.” The Sovereign Security Law provided the Ortega administration the right to infringe upon the basic human rights protected in the Nicaraguan constitution, if deemed necessary. Also, CPCs “have been replaced by Family, Community, and Life Cabinets (Gabinetes).” These cabinets are linked to the police and provide the government with a means to keep communities under constant surveillance.

In the contemporary period, multiple changes have taken place in the military regarding purpose and structure. The military currently serves as a force for national defense, public security, civil defense, and national development. In 2014, an expansion of institutional powers granted the military with the opportunity for greater involvement in international security initiatives. The National Army of Nicaragua also has the highest public approval ratings of any Nicaraguan institution.

== Equipment ==
=== Small arms ===
Name	Image	Caliber	Type	Origin	Notes
Pistols
PM		9x18mm	Semi-automatic pistol	Soviet Union	
IWI Jericho 941		9x19mm	Semi-automatic pistol	Israel	
M1911		.45 ACP	Semi-automatic pistol	United States	
Smith & Wesson Model 10		.38 Special	Revolver	United States	
Submachine guns
Uzi		9×19mm	Submachine gun	Israel	
Sa 23		9×19mm	Submachine gun	Czechoslovakia	
Heckler & Koch MP5		9×19mm	Submachine gun	Germany	
Madsen M-50		9×19mm	Submachine gun	Denmark	
Rifles
AK		7.62×39mm	Assault rifle	Soviet Union	
AKM		7.62×39mm	Assault rifle	Soviet Union	
AK-63		7.62×39mm	Assault rifle	Hungary	
PM md. 63		5.45×39mm	Assault rifle	Romania	
IMI Galil		5.56×45mm	Assault rifle	Israel	
M16		5.56×45mm	Assault rifle	United States	
T65		5.56×45mm	Assault rifle	China	
ArmaLite AR-10		7.62×51mm	Battle rifle	United States	
Sniper rifles
SVD		7.62×54mmR	DMR; Sniper rifle	Soviet Union	
Machine guns
RPD		7.62×39mm	Light machine gun	Soviet Union	
RPK		7.62×39mm	Squad automatic weapon	Soviet Union	
M60		7.62×51mm	GPMG	United States	
KPV		14.5×114mm	Heavy machine gun	Soviet Union	
DShK		12.7×108mm	Heavy machine gun	Soviet Union	
Browning M2		.50 BMG	Heavy machine gun	United States	
Rocket propelled grenade launchers
RPG-7		40mm	Rocket-propelled grenade	Soviet Union	
RPG-26		72.5mm	Rocket-propelled grenade	Soviet Union	
Grenade launchers
AGS-17		30×29mm	Automatic grenade launcher	Soviet Union	
M79		40x46mm	Automatic grenade launcher	United States	

=== Armored personnel carriers ===
Name	Image	Type	Origin	Quantity	Notes
GAZ-2330 Tigr		Infantry Mobility Vehicle	Russia	Unknown	

=== Unmanned vehicles ===
Name	Image	Type	Origin	Quantity	Notes
MV-4		Demining	Croatia	Unknown	

=== Utility vehicles ===
Name	Image	Type	Origin	Quantity	Notes
UAZ-469		Utility vehicle	Soviet Union	Unknown	
Trucks
GAZ-66		Utility truck	Soviet Union	Unknown	
Ural-4320		Utility truck	Soviet Union	Unknown	
IFA W50		Utility truck	East Germany	Unknown	
M35		Utility truck	United States	Unknown	
M54		Utility truck	United States	Unknown	

=== Boats ===
Name	Image	Type	Origin	Quantity	Notes
BMK-130		Motorboat	Soviet Union	Unknown	

=== Historical equipment ===
==== Sidearms ====
- Smith & Wesson Model 15

==== Rifles ====
- Krag–Jørgensen
- FN M1924/30
- vz. 24
- vz. 33
- M1903 Springfield
- M1 Garand 6,500 units
- M1 Carbine 66 units
- Vz.52
- Type 58
- Type 68
- FN CAL

==== Submachine gun ====
- M1928A1 Thompson
- PPSh-41

==== Machine guns ====
- Maxim
- Lewis
- ZB vz. 30 5 units
- M1918 BAR
- FN MAG

==== Anti tank weapons ====
- M67 recoilless rifle

==== Tanks ====
- 10 M4A3E8 Sherman
- 26 PT-76
- 4 M3A1 Stuart

==== Tankettes ====
- 2 L3/33

==== Armored personnel carriers ====
- 10 M2 Half-track
- M3 Half-track
- 40 T17E1 Staghound
- 20 BTR-40

==== Utility vehicles ====
- Willys M38A1
- Jeepster Commando
- Toyota Land Cruiser (J40)
- Dodge WC series
- Dodge M37
- Dodge Power Wagon
- AIL M325
- GMC CCKW
- Chevrolet G506

==== Field artillery ====
- M3
- 24 M-30

==== Mortars ====
- Soltam M-65

==== Anti-aircraft artillery ====
- QF 1-pounder pom-pom
- M45 quad mount
- 61-K
- 24 AZP S-60
- 18 KS-19
- 10 ZSU-57-2
- 34 ZSU-23-4

==== SAM system ====
- FIM-43 Redeye
- 9K31 Strela-1

== Personnel ==
=== Military careers ===
The Nicaraguan military, Fuerzas Armadas de Nicaragua, exists in a top-down hierarchy and is partitioned into multiple ranks. In order to become a Lieutenant, Captain, Major, Lieutenant Colonel or Colonel, a candidate must attend Staff College (ESEM). Alternatively, one may begin a military career as a Lieutenant, with the opportunity for advancement, by obtaining a bachelor's degree in military sciences. Individuals may also attend Officers School, to gain the rank of Major, Lieutenant Colonel, Colonel, and General Staff or Army General.

The Nicaraguan navy offers training other than that offered through ESEM, a bachelor's degree in military sciences, and Officers School. Candidates seeking to advance in the Nicaraguan navy may attend navy-specific training to become Lieutenant Commanders, Commanders, Captains, fleet Admirals, Generals, Major Generals and Generals of the Army.

Despite offering advancement through ESEM training, Officers School, and a bachelor's degree in military sciences, most high-ranking officers choose to receive their formal military education from training opportunities in Mexico, Spain, France, China, Russia, and Cuba.

=== Military size (manpower) ===
Nicaragua has a small military force with only 9,412 members as of 2010. This number includes 1,500 officers (16%), 302 non-commissioned officers (3%), and 7,610 troops (81%). This relatively small armed force is supported by an extremely small $41 million-dollar defense budget (2010). Such a small military budget has resulted in severe deficiencies in terms of manpower (i.e. cannot supply and employ) and modern weaponry. This budget represents approximately 2.84% of the country's overall expenditures.

== Works cited ==
- Cullen, Tony; Foss, Christopher F, eds. (1996). Jane's Land-Based Air Defence, 1996−97 (9th ed.). Surrey: Jane's Information Group. ISBN 978-0-7106-1352-3.
- De León-Escribano, Carmen Rosa (July 2011). "Capabilities of Police and Military Forces in Central America – A Comparative Analysis of Guatemala, El Salvador, Honduras and Nicaragua". Western Hemisphere Security Analysis Center – via Florida International University.
- English, Adrian J. (1984). Armed Forces of Latin America: Their Histories, Development, Present Strength, and Military Potential. London: Jane's Publishing Inc. ISBN 9780710603210.
- Jones, Richard D.; Ness, Leland S., eds. (2009). Jane's Infantry Weapons 2009/2010 (35th ed.). Coulsdon: Jane's Information Group. ISBN 978-0-7106-2869-5.
- Lorain, Pierre (September 1979). "Le F.M. BAR [The BAR automatic rifle]". La Gazette des Armes (in French) (74): 12–19. Archived from the original on 24 February 2021.
- O'Halloran, James C.; Foss, Christopher F., eds. (2002). Jane's Land-Based Air Defense 2002-2003 (15th ed.). Janes Information Group. ISBN 978-0-7106-2437-6.
- "The Growth of the Banana Industry | THE RISE OF UNITED STATES INFLUENCE, 1899-1932 (Honduras)". countrystudies.us. U.S. Library of Congress. "With the assistance of Salvadoran troops, Manuel Bonilla tried to resist, but in March his forces were decisively beaten in a battle notable for the introduction of machine guns into Central American civil strife."
