= Nicaragua military ranks =

The Military ranks of Nicaragua are the military insignia used by the Nicaraguan Armed Forces.

== Current ranks ==
=== Commissioned officer ranks ===
The rank insignia of commissioned officers.

Rank group	General / flag officers				Senior officers			Junior officers
Nicaraguan Army
Nicaraguan Army	General de ejército	Coronel general	Mayor general	General de brigada	Coronel	Teniente coronel	Mayor	Capitán	Teniente primero		Teniente
Nicaraguan Navy
Nicaraguan Navy		Almirante	Vicealmirante	Contralmirante	Capitán de navío	Capitán de fragata	Capitán de corbeta	Teniente de navío	Teniente de fragata	Teniente de corbeta	Alferez de fragata
Nicaraguan Air Force
Nicaraguan Air Force	General de ejército	Coronel general	Mayor general	General de brigada	Coronel	Teniente coronel	Mayor	Capitán	Teniente primero		Teniente
Rank group	General / flag officers				Senior officers			Junior officers

=== Other ranks ===
The rank insignia of non-commissioned officers and enlisted personnel.

Rank group	Senior NCOs						Junior NCOs	Enlisted
Nicaraguan Army									No insignia
Nicaraguan Army	Suboficial primero	Suboficial segundo	Suboficial	Sargento primero	Sargento segundo	Sargento tercero		Soldado de primera	Soldado
Nicaraguan Navy									No insignia
Nicaraguan Navy				Sargento primero	Sargento segundo	Sargento tercero		Marino de primera	Marino
Nicaraguan Air Force									No insignia
Nicaraguan Air Force	Suboficial primero	Suboficial segundo	Suboficial	Sargento primero	Sargento segundo	Sargento tercero		Soldado de primera	Soldado
Rank group	Senior NCOs						Junior NCOs	Enlisted

== Historic ranks ==
The Nicaraguan National Guard rank chart was directly inspired by the US Army, with chevrons pointed upwards for NCOs, horizontal linked brass bars for company officers and vertically placed gilded or silvered stars for field officers. The sequence however was slightly different, with Sergeants' ranks being limited to two only; Captains were identified by three bars instead of two as per in the US Armed Services, whilst Majors had a five-point gilded star in lieu of a leaf. National Guard rank insignia from Subteniente to Coronel resembled a US antecedent—but that of the Confederate States Army. There were also some differences in colour and nomenclature according to the branches of service: Ground Forces' NCOs had yellow on dark-green chevrons, the Air Force personnel wore white on royal blue ground forces' rank insignia whilst the Navy's Seamen and Petty Officers' ranks were identical to the other branches of the Guardia, but Line Officers had US Navy-style rank insignia on removable navy blue shoulder boards instead.

=== Commissioned officer ranks ===
The rank insignia of commissioned officers.

Rank group	General / flag officers		Senior officers			Junior officers
Ground Forces and National Police
Ground Forces and National Police	General de División (Director-Jefe de la Guardia Nacional)	General de brigada	Coronel	Teniente coronel	Mayor	Capitán	Teniente		Subteniente
Nicaraguan National Guard Navy
Nicaraguan National Guard Navy		Contralmirante	Capitán de navío	Capitán de fragata	Capitán de corbeta	Teniente de navío	Teniente de fragata	Teniente de corbeta	Alférez
Air Force of the National Guard
Air Force of the National Guard			Coronel piloto aviador	Teniente coronel piloto aviador	Mayor piloto aviador	Capitán piloto aviador	Teniente piloto aviador		Subteniente piloto aviador

=== Other ranks ===
The rank insignia of non-commissioned officers and enlisted personnel.

Rank group	Senior NCOs		Junior NCOs	Enlisted
Ground Forces and National Police					No insignia
Ground Forces and National Police	Sargento primero	Sargento segundo	Cabo	Soldado de primera	Soldado
Nicaraguan National Guard Navy					No insignia
Nicaraguan National Guard Navy	Sargento primero	Sargento segundo	Cabo	Soldado de primera	Soldado
Air Force of the National Guard					No insignia
Air Force of the National Guard	Sargento primero	Sargento segundo	Cabo	Soldado de primera	Soldado
