= Martha Elena Ruiz Sevilla =

Nicaraguan politician

Martha Elena Ruiz Sevilla is a Nicaraguan politician and lawyer who served as Minister of Defence from 2013 to 2019.

== Early life and education ==
Ruiz Sevilla is from Acoyapa. She has a Masters in Law from the Charles University in Prague.

== Career ==
Ruiz Sevilla worked for the National Authority to the Organisation for the Prohibition of Chemical Weapons and the Ministry of Environment and Natural Resources, before becoming Secretary General of the Ministry of Defence.

Ruiz Sevilla was appointed Minister of Defence by President Daniel Ortega on 19 February 2013, becoming the first woman to hold the post. She was replaced by Rosa Adelina Barahona Castro on 19 August 2019.

== Personal life ==
Ruiz Sevilla is married to Brigadier General Bayardo Ramón Rodríguez Ruiz who is the head of the General Staff of the Nicaraguan Armed Forces.
