= Type 68 =

Type 68 may refer to:

- Type 68 assault rifle, a North Korean variant of the AKM
- Type 68 pistol, a North Korean variant of the TT pistol

== See also ==
- Type 63 assault rifle, often incorrectly referred to as Type 68
