= Nicaraguan Navy =

- Fuerza Naval del Ejercito de Nicaragua
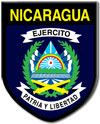
- Founded: 1980; 46 years ago
- Country: Nicaragua
- Type: Navy
- Role: Naval warfare
- Part of: Nicaraguan Armed Forces

Commanders
- Commander-in-Chief: President Daniel Ortega
- Minister of Defence: Rosa Adelina Barahona Castro
- Chief of Naval Force: Rear Admiral Ángel Eugenio Fonseca Donaire

Insignia
- Ensign

The Nicaraguan Navy, officially the Naval Force of the Nicaraguan Army, (Spanish: Fuerza Naval del Ejercito de Nicaragua) is the naval service branch of the Nicaraguan Armed Forces. The navy's mission is to ensure the defense and security of the islands, territorial waters and exclusive economic zone of Nicaragua in the Pacific Ocean and Caribbean Sea.

== History ==
Founded on August 13, 1980, as the Sandinista Navy, it consisted of a few old patrol boats in the early 1980s. The Sandinistas acquired eight Soviet Yevgenya class minesweepers, of which seven remained in 1993. Three Soviet Zhuk-class patrol boats were believed to be seaworthy, out of seven that remained at the end of 1990. Also believed to be operational are three North Korean fast patrol boats as well as two Vedette-type boats built in France and armed with Soviet 14.5mm machine guns.

The primary mission was to discourage seaborne Contra attacks and to deter CIA-run operations such as the destruction of diesel storage facilities at Corinto in 1983 and the mining of Nicaraguan harbors in 1984. The Sandinista navy (Marina de Guerra Sandinista—MGS), which had reached a peak strength of 3,000 personnel in 1990, suffered a sweeping reduction to 800 by 1993.

Nicaragua ordered two additional patrol vessels based on the Damen Stan 4207 design in 2017. The vessels were commissioned as Soberanía I (409) and Soberanía II (411) in August 2019. Unlike many other nations' vessels, which are designed solely for coast guard or environmental monitoring, these two have added a military sensor suite and a deck gun. Militarizing the vessels boosted their cost from US$20 million to US$65 million. The vessels used had previously been employed by Jamaica - HMJS Cornwall and HMJS Surrey.

== Organization ==
The commander of the navy was a Sandinista Popular Army (Ejército Popular Sandinista—EPS) officer with the rank of major. The principal bases of the MGS are at the ports of Corinto on the Pacific and Puerto Cabezas on the Caribbean. Other installations are at El Bluff near Bluefields and San Juan del Sur on the Pacific.

== Fleet ==
Class	Origin	Type	In service	Fleet
Damen Stan 4207 Patrol Vessel	Netherlands	Patrol Vessel	2	
Clase Rodman-101	Spain	Fast Patrol Boat	4	
Sin Hung-class torpedo boat	North Korea	Torpedo Boat	2	
Zhuk-class patrol boat	Soviet Union	Patrol Boat	3	
Dabur-class patrol boat	Israel	Fast Patrol Boat	10	
Vedettes côtières de surveillance maritime	France	Swift Boat	2	

== Ranks ==
=== Commissioned officer ranks ===
The rank insignia of commissioned officers.

Rank group	General / flag officers			Senior officers			Junior officers
Nicaraguan Navy
Nicaraguan Navy	Almirante	Vicealmirante	Contralmirante	Capitán de navío	Capitán de fragata	Capitán de corbeta	Teniente de navío	Teniente de fragata	Teniente de corbeta	Alferez de fragata

=== Other ranks ===
The rank insignia of non-commissioned officers and enlisted personnel.

Rank group	Senior NCOs			Junior NCOs	Enlisted
Nicaraguan Navy						No insignia
Nicaraguan Navy	Sargento primero	Sargento segundo	Sargento tercero		Marino de primera	Marino
