= National Guard (Nicaragua) =

Military of Nicaragua from 1925 to 1979

Nicaraguan National Guard
- Guardia Nacional de Nicaragua
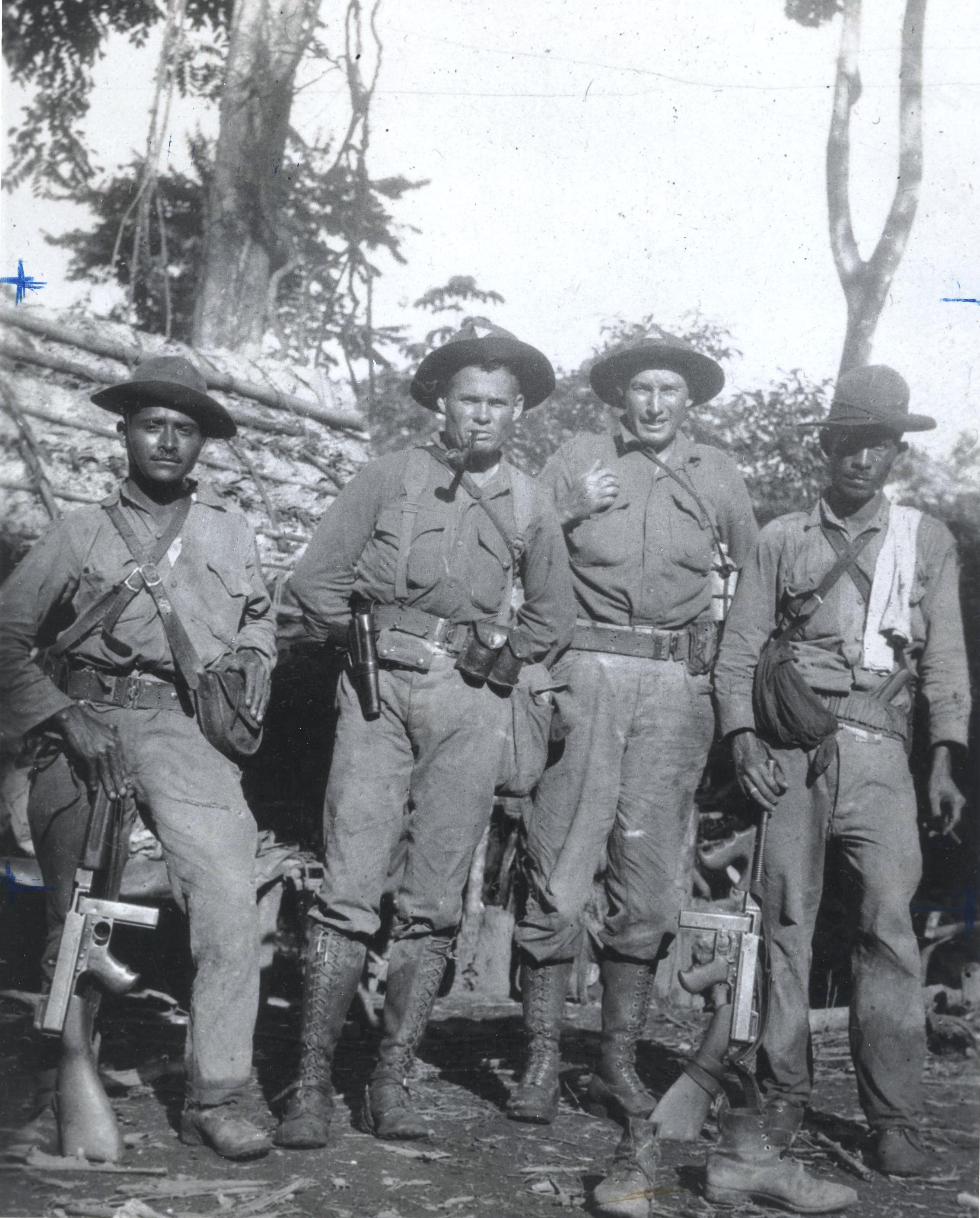
- National Guard members in 1931
- Motto: Honor, Patria, Disciplina ("Honor, Fatherland, Discipline")
- Founded: 1925
- Disbanded: 1979
- Service branches: Nicaraguan National Guard Ground Forces; Air Force of the Nicaraguan National Guard; Nicaraguan National Guard Navy; National Police of the National Guard
- Headquarters: Tiscapa Hill, Managua (Nicaragua)

Leadership
- Commander-in-Chief: Anastasio Somoza Debayle
- Chief Director: See list

Personnel
- Active personnel: 7,500 (January 1978)

Industry
- Foreign suppliers: Brazil; Canada; Spain; France; West Germany; Israel; Italy; Philippines; South Korea; Japan; Mexico; South Africa; Taiwan; United Kingdom; United States; Argentina; Paraguay; El Salvador; Morocco; Portugal; Sweden

Related articles
- History: Nicaraguan Revolution
- Ranks: Nicaragua military ranks

The Nicaraguan National Guard (Spanish: Guardia Nacional de Nicaragua, otherwise known as la Guardia) was the military created in 1925 during the occupation of Nicaragua by the United States as a militia and gendarmerie. It became notorious for human rights abuses and corruption under the regime of the Somoza family (1936–1979). The National Guard was disbanded when the Sandinistas came to power in 1979.

== Creation ==
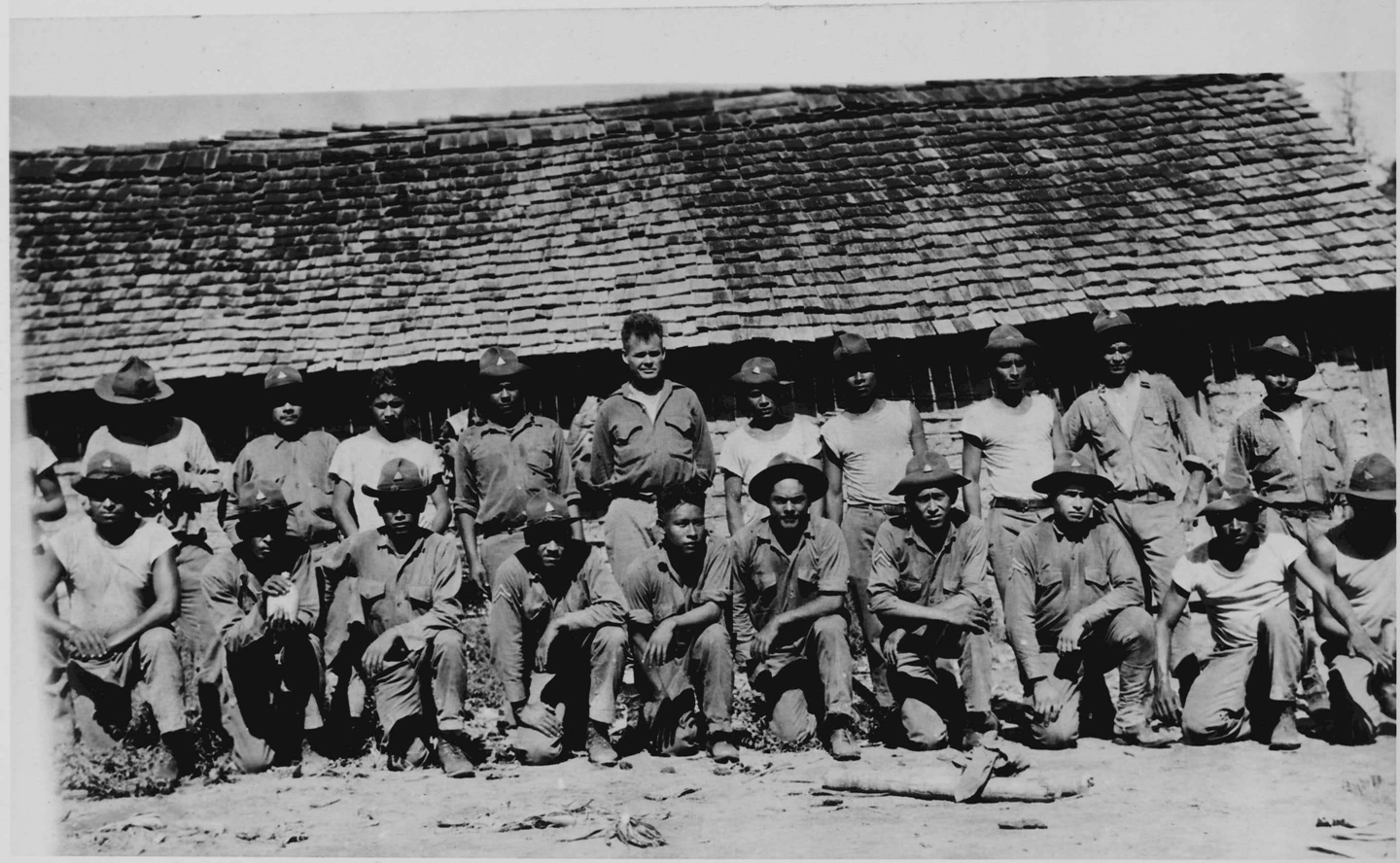
U.S. Marine 1st Lt Chesty Puller with members of the Guardia Nacional, 1931.

Prior to the U.S. occupation, the long period of civil strife had encouraged the development of a variety of private armies. The freshly elected government of President Carlos José Solórzano requested that the U.S. Marines (equally interested in central control) remain in Nicaragua until an indigenous internal security force could be trained; to that effect, the Nicaraguan government hired in 1925 a retired U.S. general to help set up a new paramilitary gendarmerie force, titled the Guardia Nacional de Nicaragua (National Guard of Nicaragua). That same year, U.S. forces left the country, but after a civil war broke out, they returned in 1926 and took over the command (and training) of the National Guard from 1927 to 1933, when it was returned to Nicaraguan control under the government of President Juan Bautista Sacasa.

President Sacasa, under political pressure from José María Moncada, who had been the leader of a rebel faction which later joined the government after U.S. mediation efforts, appointed Anastasio Somoza García as Chief Director of the National Guard in 1925. Besides being a nephew of Sacasa, Somoza García was a trusted friend of Moncada and a supporter of the liberal revolt. He was trusted by the Americans due to his service as a translator to Henry Stimson during the 1927 peace conference, schooling in the U.S., and training under the U.S. Marines (apparently, as an officer in the National Guard).

After the departure of U.S. troops in 1933 (at the height of the Great Depression), the Sacasa government opened negotiations with the National Sovereignty Defense Army (EDSN) rebel guerrilla faction led by Augusto César Sandino, which had fought both the National Guard and the U.S. occupation forces. During the negotiations, Sandino insisted on the disbandment of the National Guard as a pre-condition for any peace agreement, leading Somoza García to react ruthlessly by arresting and executing Sandino, in violation of a safe passage agreement Sacasa had given to the rebel leader. The National Guard then swiftly crushed Sandino's EDSN, further weakening the Sacasa government. By this time, the National Guard had grown to some 3,000 troops.

After using the influence of the National Guard to support Sacasa's re-election in 1936, Somoza García flouted civilian power, installing military cronies in key civilian posts and then deposed Sacasa in a coup d'état held in June that same year. With an ally appointed interim president, Somoza García then resigned from the position of Chief Director of the National Guard in order to meet the constitutional requirements to run for the presidency himself. Breaking with the Liberal party, he established the Partido Liberal Nacionalista (PLN, National Liberal Party) and Somoza was elected president in December with a reported margin of 64,000 of the 80,663 votes cast. On 1 January 1937, President Somoza García reappointed himself again chief director of the National Guard, installing a corrupt military dictatorship linked to U.S. business interests that would last four decades.

== Somoza regime ==
Somoza García rapidly took complete control of Nicaraguan institutions including the National Guard, promoting allies and purging enemies. The National Guard was the backbone of a growing network of control, eventually including telecommunications, railroads, and key civilian agencies from customs to hospitals to tax collection. In 1938, Somoza García appointed a civilian assembly that rubber-stamped constitutional changes allowing him to stay in office; his personal fortune expanded as he and his family took over key areas of the private economy. An increasingly pervasive corruption comparable to a gangland mob, with bribery, kickbacks, and sometimes violent enforcement, protected the power of the Somoza family at all levels. The U.S. supported the National Guard through the World War II Lend-Lease act and under the terms of the Rio Treaty, but did not publicly approve of Somoza García's extraconstitutional governance. The National Guard, which had been until then a predominately light infantry force composed largely of rifle companies equipped with World War I-vintage U.S. small arms, began to acquire surplus heavy equipment such as armoured cars, light tanks, transport vehicles and artillery.

The regime permitted nominal political dissent, and, in 1947, agreed to elections, hoping to mollify both the United States and local opponents, but quickly deposed the winning candidate in a coup d'état that brought strong disapproval from the U.S. Government. Under a new constitution, an assembly-appointed president, and a strong anti-communist stance relations improved. Nevertheless, Somoza García was the true power behind the curtain and an increasing target of attempted coups and assassination; he even raised a personal bodyguard separated from the rest of the National Guard and had the constitution amended to allow him to run for yet another term in 1955. In January of that same year, Somoza García, in collusion with the dictator of the Dominican Republic Rafael Trujillo, supported an unsuccessful invasion of Costa Rica from Nicaragua by exiled supporters of former President Rafael Calderón Guardia, with the Nicaraguan National guard providing air cover to the operation.

In September 1956, Somoza García was fatally shot by a young dissident poet, Rigoberto López Pérez, and was succeeded in the presidency by his elder son, Luis Somoza Debayle, while his youngest son Anastasio Somoza Debayle, a graduate of the United States Military Academy at West Point became the Chief Director of the National Guard. Brutal repression of the internal political opposition followed suit. In 1957, the National Guard was involved in the only external military action of its existence, a brief border skirmish with Honduras. In 1961, the National Guard cooperated with the U.S. Central Intelligence Agency in the preparation for the abortive Bay of Pigs Invasion of Cuba, permitting its bases to be used for training and staging areas. From May 1965 to September 1966, one infantry company of the National Guard participated in a peacekeeping operation in the Dominican Republic alongside U.S., Brazilian, Paraguayan, Honduran and Costa Rican troops as part of the Interamerican Pacification Force (FIP), deployed under the aegis of the Organization of American States (OAS). The guard's domestic power, however, gradually broadened to embrace not only its original internal security and police functions but also control over customs, telecommunications, port facilities, radio broadcasting, the merchant marine, and civil aviation.

Even as trusted friends of the family succeeded Luis in the presidency, his brother remained firmly in control of the National Guard. Eventually, in 1967, Anastasio himself was elected president; Luis soon died of a heart attack, leaving Anastasio in sole control. Without his brother's technocratic influence, Anastasio's corrupt ways were unrestrained. The 1972 Nicaragua earthquake, which severely damaged the capital of Managua, brought further evidence of corruption, as members of the National Guard openly looted damaged businesses and misappropriated international aid, and Somoza Debayle's personal wealth soared during the reconstruction period. In 1974, the growing Sandinista movement FSLN (named after the assassinated Sandino) succeeded in forcing the government to accept an amnesty, after which Somoza Debayle declared a state of siege and the National Guard launched a violent and repressive reaction in the period 1975–76. Though the FSLN was weakened, so was the regime.

== Collapse ==
Direct U.S. military aid ended in November 1978 although the U.S. still attempted to pursue a policy of "Somocismo sin Somoza," effectively allowing the power structure of the National Guard to prevent a Sandinista victory while removing the increasingly unpopular Somoza from power. The Carter Administration even sent Somoza a congratulatory note from Carter after his disputed victory in the 1978 elections.

After the assassination of opposition leader among the business elites Pedro Chamorro in January 1978, the Nicaraguan public reacted with a series of nationwide strikes and increasing political unrest against the regime. The National Guard was re-organized and expanded, growing to a force of more than 10,000 officers and enlisted men, with localized security companies dispersed throughout the country and modern specialized units such as mechanized and engineer battalions, a Presidential Guard, and a reinforced tactical battalion. The strengthened National Guard continued to tighten its grip but opposition only grew broader and fiercer. A humiliating hostage crisis ensued on 22 August 1978 when 25 Sandinista rebels disguised as National Guard soldiers led by "Comandante Cero" (Commander Zero), future Contra leader Edén Pastora, occupied the National Assembly Palace in Managua, took 2,000 hostages, and escaped to Panama with 50 released political prisoners. The seizure of the National Palace was the second major action launched by the Sandinistas.

By March 1979, the Somoza regime faced an open civil war as well as being cut off from all aid by the United States, including blocking of an emergency shipment of weapons and ammunition coming from Israel. With ammunition, spare parts, fuel, and medical supplies running dangerously low, the increasingly hard-pressed National Guard could no longer sustain a prolonged fight against the rebels. Already plagued by shaky morale, and weakened by casualties and desertions after seven weeks of battle, GN units were gradually forced to fall back to Managua.

At this point, on 17 July 1979 Somoza Debayle resigned from office and fled the country by plane to Miami, Florida, followed by almost all of the senior military officers of the National Guard's General Staff. Somoza's successor as head of state, interim President Francisco Urcuyo Maliaños opened negotiations for a cease-fire but at the same time tried to strengthen his political position by filling with younger colonels and lieutenant-colonels the depleted National Guard's General Staff, now headed by the new Chief Director Lt. Col. (later General) Federico Mejía González. The 12,000 Guardsmen still under his command, now besieged in the government quarter of Tiscapa hill at Managua and Managua International Airport, and at the remaining holdouts throughout the country were exhorted to continue the fight.

After negotiations with the Sandinistas broke down due to his refusal to resign on 18 July, President Urcuyo fled to Guatemala, leaving in charge GN Chief Director General Mejía who tried unsuccessfully to pursue conversations for the cease-fire. Faced with the rejection by the Sandinistas of his list of demands – which included retention of all property belonging to individual officers – in exchange for a surrender, on the dawn of 19 July 1979, General Mejía and most of the high-ranking officers of the General Staff left Nicaragua by plane, leaving their men leaderless.

Early in the morning of that same day as 5,000 Sandinista guerrillas and 10,000 assorted "people's militia" took control of Managua's city center and called for a cease-fire. The last senior commander of the National Guard, Lt. Col. Fulgencio Largaespada Baez finally bowed to the inevitable and ordered his demoralised and exhausted soldiers to lay down their arms. Upon the conclusion of the civil war, 7,500 Guardsmen were taken prisoner – with many former Guards suspected of violating human rights being held in detention by the Sandinistas – while another 4,500 officers and enlisted men fled to neighboring Honduras, El Salvador, Costa Rica, and Guatemala to form the nucleus of an armed opposition force to the new Nicaraguan government, which would later become known as the Contras.

The Sandinista junta replaced the disbanded Guardia Nacional with two new forces, the Ejército Popular Sandinista (EPS, Sandinista Popular Army) and the Policía Sandinista (Sandinista Police). Eventually, alumni of the National Guard would be reconstituted, with the support of the CIA and Honduras, as the Contra rebels.

Following the collapse of the National Guard, many members relocated to Guatemala and went on to form the Fifteenth of September Legion, which was committed to overthrowing the Sandinista rule.

== List of Chief Directors ==
| No. | Portrait | Chief Director | Took office | Left office | Time in office |
|---|---|---|---|---|---|
| 1 | Anastasio Somoza García | Major General; Anastasio Somoza García (1896–1956) | 1928 | 29 September 1956 † | 27–28 years |
| 2 | Anastasio Somoza Debayle | Major General; Anastasio Somoza Debayle (1925–1980) | 29 September 1956 | 1960 | 3–4 years |
| 3 | Gustavo Montiel | Brigadier General; Gustavo Montiel | 1960 | 1966 | 5–6 years |
| (2) | Anastasio Somoza Debayle | Major General; Anastasio Somoza Debayle (1925–1980) | 1966 | July 1979 | 12–13 years |
| 4 | Federico Mejía González | General; Federico Mejía González | July 1979 | July 1979 | 0 months |
| 5 | Fulgencio Largaespada Baez | Lieutenant Colonel; Fulgencio Largaespada Baez | July 1979 | July 1979 | 0 months |

=== Notable National Guard officers ===
- Brigadier general José R. Somoza (a.k.a. "Don José", "Papa Chepe") – Inspector-general of the National Guard from 1976 to 1979.
- Colonel Anastasio Somoza Portocarrero (a.k.a. "El Chigüín") – Founder and Chief Director of the Infantry Basic Training School (EEBI) from 1976 to 1979.
- Colonel Donaldo Humberto Frixote – Commander of the Air Force of the Nicaraguan National Guard
- Lieutenant colonel Enrique Bermúdez – GN Military attaché in Washington, D.C. until 1979 and later head of the military wing of the Nicaraguan Democratic Force (FDN), the largest Contra guerrilla movement in the 1980s
- Major Pablo Emilio Salazar (a.k.a. "Comandante Bravo") – Commander of the GN Southern Front in 1978–79
- Major Franklin Montenegro
- Captain Justiniano Pérez – Vice-director and Executive officer of the Infantry Basic Training School (EEBI) from 1977 to 1979.
- Captain Juan Francisco Rivera (a.k.a. "El Gato") – Head of the personnel section of the Infantry Basic Training School (EEBI) from 1977 to 1979.

== Appearance and insignia ==
=== Uniforms ===
Standard uniform for all ranks since the late 1920s was the U.S. Army's tropical 'Chino' khaki cotton shirt and pants, worn with the US M1912 Campaign Hat (a.k.a. 'Montana Peak Hat') in Olive Drab felt with the triangular Nicaraguan national cap badge. Military Academy cadets were issued a special version of the 'Chino' uniform, with the shirt modified by the addition of black shoulder straps and breast pockets' flaps dyed black. Officers and sometimes NCOs wore in the field breeches and riding boots or the US M1931 cavalry laced boots whereas the other ranks' had their trousers trucked into US-type canvas (or leather) gaiters and ankle boots. The latter consisted of brown leather Field Shoes M-1918 (Pershing boot) and Type II/III Service Shoes, later replaced by the M-1943 Combat Service Boots and the M-1948 Russet Leather Lace-Up Boots. A four-pocket, open-collar beltless tunic modelled after the US M1926 pattern was adopted by Guardia officers and worn with a khaki shirt and tie, replaced by a white shirt and black tie on formal occasions; in active and formal service, a brown leather Sam Browne belt (US Officer's belt, M1921) was frequently worn with the tunic. A tropical white linen dress uniform very similar to the US Navy's Service Dress White or "chokers", was adopted by the Guardia and naval service officers and Military Academy cadets. Comprising a high-collar tunic, slacks and white shoes plus a matching peaked cap, the tunic was worn with removable exaggerated twisted cord epaulettes and a red silk sash tied around the waist on formal occasions whilst enlisted ranks wore exaggerated black buff chevrons instead. Starting in the mid-1930s, Guardia officers began being issued with the M1937 or M1942 American peaked caps, in either light tropical khaki and Olive Drab wool cloth, which slowly began to replace the campaign hat in service dress. The khaki US M1934 sidecap (a.k.a. 'garrison cap') was also supplied to GN personnel during the 1930-1940s.

Guardia uniforms underwent some changes in the 1950s and 1960s, with officers adopting the US M1942 light khaki service dress, comprising tunic, slacks and a matching peaked cap with brown-japanned chinstrap and peak, or black dress cap with gold chinstrap, black peak with gold leaf embroidery for field and general ranks (the GN Chief Director had additional French-style embroidery on the cap band), and silver triangular national cap badge. For formal occasions, senior officers adopted a black ceremonial version of their M1942 service dress with gold embroidered insignia whilst the other ranks' retained the old khaki 'Chino' uniform as barrack dress or for walking-out, usually worn with the khaki sidecap. The 'Sam Browne' belt was discontinued, and brown (black for the other GN branches) leather shoes replaced the earlier breeches and riding boots.

Nicaraguan Air Force (FAGN) officers received a royal blue US Air Force-style M1947 service dress, worn with a light blue shirt and royal blue tie on formal occasions; a short-sleeved shirt and matching royal blue sidecap (a.k.a. 'flight cap') was worn by officers and other ranks in active service. The Nicaraguan Navy retained both the white dress and khaki uniforms, with officers' adopting a modified version of the M1942 tunic with removable shoulder boards, which was worn with a light khaki shirt and black tie on service dress.

Nicaraguan National Police (PNGN) officers' continued to wear as service dress the 'Chino' khaki shirt (in long or short sleeve versions) and trousers with shoes or Olive Green (OG) fatigues with combat boots, whereas female constables were given a khaki short-sleeved blouse and assorted knee-length skirt worn with a flat-top, short snapped-brimmed khaki hat. Their male counterparts retained the 'Montana Peak' Hat as standard headgear, though the latter also began to be replaced by a light khaki M1954-type Visor Cap; police officers on traffic control duties were given a white-topped version. It never entirely superseded the earlier headgear however, for photos taken in Managua at the time of the 1972 earthquake show local policemen going on patrol still wearing the old 'Montana' Hat. While on patrol duties, the M1912 black leather Sam Browne belt with pistol holster and assorted magazine pouches, handcuff pouch and M1944 baton in its respective carrier was worn.

Around the late 1960s Guardia units began to receive surplus American Olive Green tropical uniforms, the US Army OG-107 cotton sateen utilities and the M1967 Jungle Utility Uniform. Elite formations within the GN received camouflage versions of these same uniforms, first in the "Duck Hunter" pattern, soon followed by "Tigerstripe" (ERDL Thai Tadpole type) and "Highland" (ERDL 1948 Leaf pattern, a.k.a. "Woodland pattern"). National Police BECAT teams had their own distinctive "Tan leaf" pattern, which consisted of puzzle leaf-shapes in medium brown, light brown, and sandy-grey on a tan background.

Standard headgear for all-ranks in the Guardia was either the US Army M1943 'Walker cap' and M1951 Olive Green Field caps, the tropical OG-106 Baseball cap or the IDF "Old style" Olive Drab fatigue cap, partially replaced on the field by US Army Boonie hats or US Marines' utility caps in both olive green and ERDL camouflage versions. Specialized units authorized berets wore them pulled to the right, American-fashion, with the colour sequence for the ground forces as follows: Armoured Cavalry and Counter-insurgency "Commandos" – Black; Paratroopers – Cherry-red (Maroon); Presidential Guard – Green; GN berets were made of one-piece artificial wool attached to a black leather rim-band, with both US or Israeli patterns being worn.

Black leather combat boots were also provided by the Americans who issued both the early US Army M-1962 'McNamara' model and the M-1967 model with DMS 'ripple' pattern rubbler sole; the US Army Jungle boot of Vietnam War fame was worn by Nicaraguan soldiers and Police officers only while operating in tropical jungle or marshy ground environments.

=== Helmets and body armour ===
The first combat helmet provided to Guardia units was the US steel M1917 A1 "Kelly" helmet during World War II, replaced in 1954 by the M-1, issued with a Mitchell 'Clouds' pattern camouflage cover and the Israeli-made Orlite Industries Ltd composite fibreglass OR-201 Model 76 ballistic helmet, which began to replace the earlier M-1 in 1977. Period photos however, do show GN soldiers and National Police constables within the same units wearing side-by-side both US and Israeli types, often worn plain without camo covers. Armoured crews, depending on the vehicle they manned, received either the old World War II US M1938 'Gruyére' composite fiber-and-leather crash helmet or the Vietnam-era fiberglass 'bone dome' Combat Vehicle Crew (CVC) T-56-6 helmet though neither models offered any satisfactory protection against shrapnel or small arms rounds. Guardia's military and National Police personnel were also issued with flak jackets, either the Ballistic Nylon US M-1952 and M-1952/69 'Half-collar' versions or the Israeli-produced Kevlar Rabintex Industries Ltd Type III RAV 200 Protective Vest (Hebrew: "Shapats").

=== Accoutrements ===
Web gear was supplied by the Americans, who provided to the early Guardia infantry companies the khaki web M-1910 infantry equipment in all of its versions (M-1917/18 and later World War II/Korean War M-1945 patterns). With the full introduction of semi-automatic and automatic small-arms, however, the GN and Police adopted both the US Army M-1956 load-carrying equipment (LCE) in khaki cotton canvas and the M-1967 modernized load-carrying equipment (MLCE) in OG Nylon; some photos do show that the all-purpose lightweight individual carrying equipment (ALICE), an upgrade of the latter, was also given to some Guardia troops in 1978–79. Usually, personnel armed with M-1s, FALs and M16s tended to be issued with American web gear whereas those soldiers or policemen issued Galils or Uzi SMGs received the IDF 1950's "Old style" tan-khaki cotton canvas equipment (similar in design to the British Army's 58 pattern webbing) or the newer olive green Nylon Ephod Combat Vest instead.

=== Rank insignia ===
The Nicaraguan National Guard rank chart was directly inspired by the US Army, with chevrons pointed upwards for NCOs, horizontal linked brass bars for company officers and vertically placed gilded or silvered stars for field officers. The sequence, however, was slightly different, with sergeants' ranks being limited to two only; captains were identified by three bars instead of two as per in the US Armed Services, whilst majors had a five-point gilded star in lieu of a leaf. National Guard rank insignia from Subteniente to Coronel resembled a US antecedent—but that of the Confederate States Army. There were also some differences in colour and nomenclature according to the branches of service: Ground Forces' NCOs had yellow on dark-green chevrons, the Air Force personnel wore white on royal blue ground forces' rank insignia whilst the Navy's seamen and petty officers' ranks were identical to the other branches of the Guardia, but line officers had US Navy-style rank insignia on removable navy blue shoulder boards instead.

=== Branch insignia ===
Skills and trades badges followed more closely the American practice. The ground forces officers' service dress tunic had the triangular national cap badge on the collar and US-style brass lapel insignia: crossed rifles – infantry; crossed cavalry sabres and tank – armor; crossed cannons – artillery; castle – engineers; crossed signal flags and torch – signals; Caduceus – medical department, whilst pilot-qualified officers of the Air Force had the winged propeller badge on the lapels.

When the Guardia was formed in the mid-1920s, its personnel wore on the left sleeve of their light khaki shirts a simple diamond-shaped blue patch with the white letters "GN", later replaced by a more elaborate system of service and unit insignia. On the olive green or camouflage combat uniforms, officers' wore cloth subdued or black metal pin-on rank insignia on the right collar, branch insignia on the left, and NCOs' yellow chevrons on an olive green background. A subdued nametape was worn over the right breast pocket, the 'Guardia' national title on the left, and full-colour or subdued unit patches and shoulder titles on both sleeves. Members of the 1st Armored Battalion wore at the sides of their OR-201 helmets a blue triangular-shaped decal bearing the unit's black crest inserted on a white disc at the center. For parade in field dress branch-colour neck scarfs were worn, being light blue for infantry and EEBI "Commandos", black for armour, red for artillery, yellow for engineers and signals, and apple green for the GN General Staff.

== Weapons and equipment ==
Throughout its existence, the Nicaraguan National Guard received military assistance mainly from the United States, who provided since the late 1920s everything that the Guardia used, from uniforms and boots to rifles, artillery and vehicles, mostly under the US Military Assistance Program (MAP). However, starting in the early 1950s, the Somozas made consistent efforts to diversify their sources of military hardware and supplies in a hope to reduce their dependence from the Americans. The majority of its weaponry until the mid-1970s consisted of U.S.-made surplus 'hand-me-downs' from both world wars, Korea and Vietnam, partially supplemented by more modern equipment either donated or sold by Israel, Spain, Argentina, Morocco, and South Africa, particularly after U.S. aid was cut in 1978. Other countries such as Italy, West Germany, Portugal, El Salvador, Paraguay, Sweden, South Korea, and the Philippines were also involved in providing some form of covert aid or acted as brokers in secret arms deals.

=== Small arms ===
The first standard issue weapon of the Guardia Nacional (GN) infantry companies at the mid-1920s was the Krag–Jørgensen US M1896/98 .30-40 (7.62 mm) bolt-action rifle, soon superseded by the Springfield US M1903 .30-06 (7.62×63mm). The squad weapon was the Browning Automatic Rifle (BAR) M1918A2 US .30-06 (7.62×63mm) light machine gun – the GN also appears to have received the American-made version of the famed World War I British-made Lewis gun .303 (7.7mm), the Savage Model 1917 LMG chambered for the US .30-06 (7.62×63mm) cartridge –, with the company weapons being the Colt-Browning M1895 "potato digger" .30-06 medium machine gun and the US M1917A1 .30-06 Browning water-cooled medium machine gun. Officers and NCOs received the Thompson M1928A1 US .45 caliber (11.4mm) submachine gun, as well as the Colt M1911A1 .45 caliber (11.4mm) semi-automatic pistol as personal sidearm. A small number of ZB vz. 30 light machine guns were acquired from Czechoslovakia in 1937 for evaluation, but they were never adopted as standard weapons by the GN.

In the 1940s–1950s, the GN received surplus American infantry weapons of World War II/Korean War-vintage – M1/M2 US .30 carbines (7.62×33mm) and M1 Garand US .30-06 (7.62×63mm) semi-automatic rifles replaced the earlier bolt-action Springfields, with Thompson M1A1 and M3 "Grease Gun" submachine gun models in US .45 caliber (11.4mm) replacing the older Thompson M1928A1 model. Although the popular Colt pistol was retained, Colt Cobra .38 Special snub-nose revolvers, Smith & Wesson Model 10 revolvers and Smith & Wesson Model 15 revolvers in .38 Special were also adopted. Medium and heavy machine guns, in the form of the M1919A4 US .30-06 Browning (7.62×63mm) – or its M1919A6 light machine gun version – and the larger M2HB .50 Browning (12.7×99mm) were added to the Guardia's arsenal, replacing the ageing M1895 and M1917A1 water-cooled medium machine guns.

Assault rifles began to be adopted towards the end of the 1960s, though they never displaced entirely the earlier weaponry, such as the Garand rifle which remained the weapon of choice for soldiers serving in the Guardia's infamous firing squads and the security companies, who employed it to disperse demonstrations. Nevertheless, by 1978–79 most GN infantry formations had either the Belgian FN FAL (or its Israeli version, the lightened ROMAT) 7.62×51mm NATO or US M16A1 5.56×45mm assault rifles, with elite units receiving the Belgian FN CAL 5.56×45mm NATO or the Israeli-made IMI Galil SAR and ARM variants in both 5.56×45mm and 7.62×51mm, which was adopted in the mid-1970s. At squad level, the Belgium-made FN MAG 58 and US M60 light machine guns both in 7.62×51mm NATO, replaced the obsolete BAR and Savage models, though the heavier Brownings were retained as platoon and company machine guns. The Israeli Uzi 9mm submachine gun was also given to armoured crews, Police BECAT teams and EEBI "Commando" troops, who were also issued the US Remington Model 700 Sniper rifle 7.62×51mm, and the Ithaca Model 37 12-gauge and Remington Model 870 12-gauge pump-action shotguns.

Hand grenades were supplied by the Americans, who provided M59 "Baseball" hand grenades, Mark 2 "Pineapple" Fragmentation Hand/Rifle Grenades, M61 Fragmentation Hand Grenades, M67 grenades, M26A1 Fragmentation Hand Grenades, M34 White Phosphorus Smoke Grenades and M18 Smoke Hand Grenades; M18A1 Claymore Antipersonnel Mines were also employed. The Nicaraguan infantryman was also provided with two types of portable rocket weapons, the shoulder-fired US M79 "Blooper" 40mm single-shot grenade launcher and the expendable anti-tank, one-shot US M72 LAW 66 mm.

=== Mortars and artillery ===
Guardia infantry and artillery formations were equipped with a variety of crew-served weapons. Light mortars ranged from the M2 60 mm and M1 81 mm models of World War II-vintage, to the more recent M29 81 mm; some selected elite troops received the Israeli-designed Soltam M-65 120 mm heavy mortar. They were also issued US M18 57 mm, M20 75 mm, M67 90 mm and M40A1 106 mm recoilless rifles. The field artillery battery was provided with six to nine World War II-vintage M3 37 mm towed anti-tank guns, four US M101A1 105 mm towed Howitzers and an unspecified number of EDESA Yarará 70 mm 42-tube multiple rocket launchers of Argentinian origin mounted on Chevrolet C-10 Cheyenne 4×4 light pickups whereas the Anti-Aircraft battery operated US Maxson M45 Quadmount turrets on towed wheeled trailers and Israeli-supplied Hispano-Suiza HS.404 20 mm autocannons mounted on the TCM-20 turret configuration. Usually installed on the back of cross-country vehicles, such weapon systems proved useful in the direct fire supporting role, particularly against fortified positions and to root out snipers from urban buildings. The AA battery originally fielded six to eight M1 Bofors 40 mm Anti-Aircraft guns, but these were re-fitted in 1979 to a civilian cargo vessel commandeered from the Memnic Line Company, in order to provide direct fire support off the Pacific coast to Guardia infantry units fighting in the Southern Front. It is also rumored that the anti-aircraft battery received from Israel in 1977–78 an unspecified number of surplus US-made General Dynamics FIM-43 Redeye man-portable surface-to-air missiles (SAM).

=== Combat and transport vehicles ===
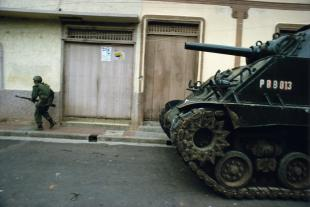
A M4 Sherman tank of the Nicaraguan National Guard during clashes with Sandinista rebels in Estelí, 1979.

The Guardia also fielded a small armoured corps, organized since 1978 into a single mechanized company while platoon-sized units where attached to General Somoza Combat Battalion, the Presidential Guard, the engineer battalion, and the EEBI Infantry School. The inventory consisted mostly of World War II-vintage American vehicles acquired in the 1950s – ten ex-Philippine Army M4A3 E8 (76) and M4A3E8 (105) Sherman tanks, three to four M3A1 Stuart light tanks, and eighteen T17E1 M6 Staghound armoured cars of Israeli origin (some had their turrets removed and replaced by a 30. or 50. cal Browning HMG mount instead). In addition, two obsolete L3/33 tankettes acquired from Italy in the mid-1930s were reportedly held in reserve, but only one (nicknamed "La Mascota" by the Nicaraguans) was still kept in running conditions by 1979.

Apart from a mere ten M2 half-track cars, the Guardia suffered from a chronic shortage of light armored personnel carriers (APCs) for its infantry units, forcing them to rely on their extensive fleet of soft-skinned transport and liaison vehicles. These ranged from World War II-vintage Willys MB ¼-ton 4×4 jeeps and Dodge WC51 ¾-ton 4×4 utility trucks to more modern Willys M38A1 MD ¼-ton 4×4 jeeps and Willys CJ-5 4×4 jeeps, Spanish VIASA-Ebro trucks MB-CJ6b jeeps (Spanish-produced version of the Willys CJ-3B jeep), Santana Series III (Spanish-produced variant of the Land Rover Series III model) and Toyota Land Cruiser (J40) light pickups, VIASA-Ebro trucks "Campeador" one-ton pickups (Spanish-produced variant of the Jeepster Commando), M151A1 ¼-ton 4×4 utility trucks (nicknamed "Pumas" by the Nicaraguans), Dodge M37B ¾-ton 4×4 1953 utility trucks (nicknamed "Chatas" by the Nicaraguans; in 1978, one M37B was converted by the GN engineers into an armored car prototype dubbed "La Trigra", but the whole project was discontinued due to the lack of funds), and Israeli AIL M325 Command Cars ("Nun-Nun") and Mercedes-Benz Unimog 404 light trucks. Heavy transport vehicles were also employed, ranging from older World War II GMC CCKW 2½-ton 6×6 and Chevrolet G506 1½-ton 4×4 trucks to newer US Dodge W500/W600 Power Wagon 4×4 medium-duty trucks, US M35A2 2½-ton 6×6 cargo trucks and US M39 5-ton 6x6 cargo trucks, and Spanish Pegaso 3046 4×4 and 3050 6×6 heavy-duty trucks, which the GN received in both civilian and military versions.

Besides being used as troop carriers these vehicles also doubled as 'gun trucks' or 'technicals', being fitted with heavy machine-guns, recoilless rifles and AA autocannons. Moreover, their lack of protection rendered them highly vulnerable to improvised explosive devices (IEDs) or small-arms fire, and many were lost together with their crews in 1979 due to intense street fighting and ambushes in rural areas.

Commandeered tracked Caterpillar or wheeled civilian Bulldozers of American and Spanish origin were also employed by the Guardia during the battles for Masaya and Managua to clear paths on rebel-held urban neighbourhoods by demolishing buildings turned into bunkers by the guerrillas.

== Order of battle as by 1978–1979 ==
=== Ground Forces ===
In January 1978 National Guard overall strength peaked at about 25,000 officers and enlisted men under the direct personal command of their Chief Director and President of Nicaragua Major general Anastasio Somoza Debayle (a.k.a. 'Tachito'). Often described as something closer to a corps of feudal retainers (or an occupation force) than to a modern national army, the GN was primarily organized for internal security and Counter-insurgency (COIN) operations rather than national defense, with most infantry units being assigned static garrison duties, and consequently its conventional military value was very low. Out of this total some 10,000–12,500 served in the ground forces proper (including women in the military and PNGN), but only about 7,500 were combat troops, organized into one Presidential Guard battalion, one armoured battalion, one mechanized infantry battalion, one mechanized company, one engineer battalion, one Military Police battalion, one field artillery battery and one anti-aircraft battery, plus sixteen security companies. All the aforementioned units were deployed in traditional Spanish colonial fashion in fortress-like cuarteles (Quarters; barracks-cum-garrisons) in the main cities, including the national capital of Managua. The Headquarters of the GN's General Staff was placed at the heart of the government quarter of Tiscapa Hill near downtown Managua, allocated in an underground bunker-style complex built after the 1972 Nicaragua earthquake; the quarter's adjacent facilities also housed the main offices' of the Guardia's own administration, signals, engineering, medical, logistics and military justice support services, and the main military schools.

Managua was also home to most of the GN's main tactical units such as the Batallón de Guardia Presidencial (BGP, Presidential Guard Battalion), the Patrulla Presidencial (PP, Presidential VIP protection unit), the Primero Batallón Blindado (PBB, 1st Armoured Battalion), the Batallón de Combate General Somoza (BCGS, General Somoza Combat Battalion), the Batallón de Ingeniería (Engineer Battalion), the Batallón de Policía Militar (BPM, Military Police Battalion), and the Field Artillery Batteries. All of them formed part of the Managua garrison.

The Compañías de Seguridad de la Guardia Nacional (CSGN, NG Security Companies for short) were dispersed throughout the country's 16 departments (Spanish: Departamentos), being allocated one per each in the departamental capitals of Boaco (Boaco), Jinotepe (Carazo), Chinandega (Chinandega), Juigalpa (Chontales), Estelí (Estelí), Granada (Granada), Jinotega (Jinotega), León (León), Madriz (Somoto), Masaya (Masaya), Matagalpa (Matagalpa), Ocotal (Nueva Segovia), Rivas (Rivas), San Carlos (Río San Juan) and Bluefields (Zelaya).

=== Air Forces ===
The Fuerza Aérea de La Guardia Nacional (FAGN, Air Force of the Nicaraguan National Guard) in 1978 comprised some 1,500 officers and enlisted men, including pilots and ground personnel, under the command of Colonel Donaldo Humberto Frixote, an experienced pilot and staunch Somoza loyalist. FAGN main air elements at the time consisted of four squadrons – one attack, one helio, one transport and one advanced training – provided with a mixed inventory of aircraft of various types, mostly of U.S., Israeli, British, Canadian and Spanish origin, the majority being propeller-driven. All FAGN aircraft and personnel were concentrated at the military airbase adjacent to the then Mercedes International Airport at Managua, which also housed the Air Force HQ and the Aviation School.

- The Escuadrón de Combate (combat squadron), operated on air assault and counter-insurgency missions ten Cessna 337A Super Skymaster "Push and Pull" light aircraft converted for the ground attack and close air support roles, either seven or eleven North American T-28A/D Trojan dual-seat trainers converted for the ground attack role, seven Lockheed T-33A dual-seat jet trainers converted to the fighter-bomber role, two Douglas A-20G Havoc night fighters and seven Douglas A-26B/C Invader reconnaissance/light bombers.
- The Escuadrón de Ala Rotatoria (helicopter squadron) aligned for aerial reconnaissance, search-and-rescue (SAR), transport and assault duties eleven Sikorsky S-58T (CH-34A) Choctaw helicopters converted for the gunship role (nicknamed "Skyraiders" by the Nicaraguans), twelve Hughes OH-6A/H-369HS Defender light observation helicopters, four Hiller 12B Raven light utility helicopters, three Hughes 269 A/B (TH-55A) Osage light utility helicopters, two Bell UH-1H Iroquois utility transports, an unspecified number of Sikorsky H-19 Chickasaw utility helicopters and one Bell 47H light utility helicopter.
- The Escuadrón de Transporte (transport squadron) operated thirteen Douglas C-47 Skytrain transports, eight Cessna 180 Skywagon light utility aircraft, seven Cessna 185 (U-17B) Skywagon light utility aircraft, seven Beech 18 (C-45) Expeditor trainer & utility aircraft, six De Havilland Canada DHC-3 (U-1A) Otter STOL utility transports, five CASA C-212 Aviocar medium transports, two IAI Arava 201 STOL utility transports, two Piper PA-23-250 Aztec twin-engined light piston utility transports, eight Piper PA-34-200 Seneca twin-engined light utility transports, one Hawker Siddeley HS-125-600B mid-size business jet, one Rockwell Aero Commander 680FL Grand utility transport and an unspecified number of Cessna 421 Golden Eagle light transports.
- The advanced training squadron of the Aviation School operated twenty-nine North American AT-6 Texan dual-seat trainers, ten Piper PA-18 Super Cub light utility aircraft, seven Cessna 172 J/K Skyhawk utility aircraft and six Fairchild PT-19A trainers.

=== Naval forces ===
The Marina de Guerra de la Guardia Nacional (MG-GN, Nicaraguan National Guard Navy) in 1978 stood at about 1,000 sailors and ratings who manned a surface flotilla of some eight to ten Israeli Dabur-1 class patrol boats, one GC2 patrol boat, one GC6 patrol boat, and one Swiftships 85 ft-type patrol boat. The MG-GN flotilla was divided into a Pacific coast patrol squadron, the Guardia Marina del Pacífico, and an Atlantic coast patrol squadron, the Guardia Marina del Atlântico. Main naval bases were situated at the coastal towns of Corinto (Chinandega) on the Pacific coast and Puerto Cabezas (Zelaya) on the Caribbean coast, with secondary naval stations set up at San Juan del Sur (Rivas) and El Bluff near Bluefields (Zelaya).

=== National Police branch ===
Created in 1970 out of the law-enforcement branch of the Guardia, the Policia Nacional – Guardia Nacional (PNGN, National Police of the National Guard) was a municipal constabulary numbering some 9,000–10,000 male and female uniformed constables, although other sources estimate that their actual number was no fewer than 3,000–8,000. Most of its lightly armed personnel were concentrated in the main cities (Managua, León, Matagalpa, and Masaya) on police duties, or assigned to the Brigadas Especiales contra Actos de Terrorismo (BECAT, Special Counter-insurgency Brigades). This was an urban rapid-reaction, anti-terrorist unit closely modelled on SWAT, whose members received special camouflage uniforms and Israeli helmets and flak vests, being armed with Uzi SMGs, M-16s, pump-action shotguns and sniper rifles. Easily recognizable by their Willys CJ-5 4×4 jeeps equipped with vehicular beacons, sirens and wire cutters installed on the front bumper, and painted in blue-and-white National Police markings, BECAT teams were frequently employed in raids at Nicaraguan urban slums in search for hidden guerrillas, and quickly earned an unenviable reputation for brutality.

=== Special Forces ===
By July 1979, the GN also fielded some 2,000–2,500 elite counter-insurgency EEBI troops, comprising Commandos (a.k.a. the Boinas Negras or "Black Berets", first formed in 1968), Paratroopers (a.k.a. the Gansos Salvajes or "Wild Geese", formed in 1978–79) and infantry trainees led by Major (later, Colonel) Anastasio Somoza Portocarrero, in armed jeeps and gun-trucks plus two small artillery and armoured car platoons.

== Training institutions ==
It is estimated that 4,252 Nicaraguan servicemen had been trained by the United States between 1970 and 1976 at the Inter-American Military Academy (a.k.a. "School of the Americas") at Fort Gulick in the Panama Canal Zone, in the Psychological and Special Warfare Academy at Fort Bragg, and at the Inter-American Defense College in Washington D.C.

=== Military Academy – AMN ===
Created on 9 November 1939, the Academia Militar de Nicaragua (AMN, Nicaraguan Military Academy) was the noncommissioned officers' and Officer Candidate School and Staff College of the Guardia Nacional. Modelled after the West Point Academy, the AMN was initially staffed by a cadre of US Army instructors headed by Brigadier-General Charles L. Mullins (1939–1942), himself a West Point graduate. He was succeeded as Director of the AMN by other three US Army senior officers, Brigadier-General Fred T. Cruse (1942–1943), Brigadier-General LeRoy Bartlett jr. (1943–1946) and Brigadier-General John F. Greco (1947) until GN Infantry Colonel Anastasio Somoza Debayle was appointed its first Nicaraguan-born Superintendent in 1948.

=== Infantry Basic Training School – EEBI ===
The Escuela de Entrenamiento Basico de Infanteria (EEBI, Infantry Basic Training School) was founded in 1976–77 by then Capitan Anastasio Somoza Portocarrero upon his return from the United States after attending both the U.S. Army Infantry School at Fort Benning and the U.S. Army school for psychological and special warfare at Fort Bragg. Initially attached for administrative purposes to the 3rd company of the General Somoza Combat Battalion and headquartered at Tiscapa Hill just outside Managua, the EEBI was an indigenous Special Forces training center modelled after Fort Bragg, and was tasked of training the Guardia's own elite anti-guerrilla Commandos, the "Black Berets" and its first parachute unit, the "Wild Geese". Inspired on the U.S. Special Forces (USSF), Chilean Army Commandos' and Brazilian Army Paratroopers' training programs, the School's own special curriculum placed emphasis on counter-insurgency. Advanced courses ranged from basic light infantry skills, jungle combat and survival to sniper, light and heavy weapons (mortars and artillery), demolitions, 'Commando' operations and intelligence, reconnaissance (Ranger), communications, medical, airborne and even light armor tactics. Ex-USSF and exiled South Vietnamese LLDB instructors conducted most of the training, though the School's teaching staff is said to have included anti-Castro Cuban exiles (former members of the Brigade 2506, which had participated in the ill-fated Bay of Pigs invasion in 1961), Guatemalans, Salvadorans and Chileans, as well as Israeli and German mercenaries.

=== Signals School ===
The Escuela de Transmissiones (Signals School) was established on 15 January 1933.

=== Nicaraguan Air Force Academy – EMA ===
A Escuela del Aire (Air School) was first formed in 1932 to train Nicaraguan pilots for the recently created National Guard Air Wing, though it was only in August 1940 that was formally established at Managua airfield as the Escuela Militar de Aviación (EMA, Military Aviation School).

=== National Guard Police Academy – ENP ===
The Escuela Nacional de Policia (ENP, National Police School) was the Police Academy of the National Guard.

=== Lake Managua Weapons Range ===
The Polígono de Tiro (Weapons Range) was located close to Lake Managua, being used for artillery and air superiority training of GN ground units and Air Force pilots.

== In popular culture ==
The Nicaraguan National Guard was featured in three major film productions, all set during the 1979 Nicaraguan Revolution, the first being the 1980 German film The Uprising shot on location at Nicaragua. This was followed in 1983 by the Hollywood films Last Plane Out and Under Fire; the latter was actually shot at Mexico with Mexican Army soldiers portraying both Guardia' troops and FSLN guerrillas.

== See also ==
- Banana Wars
- Contras
- Guatemalan Civil War
- National Guard (El Salvador)
- Nicaraguan Revolution
- Salvadoran Civil War
- Sandinista Popular Army
- Somoza Family
- Weapons of the Salvadoran Civil War
