= Camilo Ortega =

Nicaraguan revolutionary

- Born: December 13, 1950; Managua
- Died: February 26, 1978 (aged 27)
- Movement: Sandinista National Liberation Front
- Relatives: Daniel Ortega and Humberto Ortega (brothers)

Camilo Antonio Ortega Saavedra (December 13, 1950 – February 26, 1978) was a Nicaraguan revolutionary with the Sandinista National Liberation Front who was killed in the struggle to overthrow the Somoza regime. He was the younger brother of eventual Nicaraguan president Daniel Ortega and Nicaraguan Minister of Defense Humberto Ortega.

== Biography ==
Camilo Ortega was born on December 13, 1950, in Managua, Nicaragua. He was the youngest child in a family of six children. His father, Daniel Ortega and his mother Lidia Saavedra, were both leftists opposed to the Somoza family regime. Like his brothers, he joined the revolutionary movement which became the Sandinista National Liberation Front (FSLN), but he died before the FSLN overthrew the Somoza government through armed struggle in 1979.

In 1972, Ortega traveled to Cuba for training. He remained there, becoming the chief emissary of the FSLN to Cuba and only returned to Nicaragua in 1975.

On February 26, 1978, Ortega attended a meeting with other Sandinista militants at a house in the neighborhood of Las Sabogales, Masaya, when they were attacked by soldiers of Somoza's National Guard. Ortega died in the battle along with several others including Moisés Rivera and Arnoldo Kuant. Their deaths became known as "the massacre of Las Sabogales."
