= Sandinista Popular Army =

1979–1995 military forces of Nicaragua

- Ejército Popular Sandinista (Spanish)
- Flag of the FSLN
- Active: 1979–1995
- Country: Nicaragua
- Allegiance: Sandinistas
- Branch: Militia
- Type: Armed Forces: Army; Navy; Air Force
- Role: Defense; Counter-insurgency
- Size: 13,500 (1993)
- Engagements: Nicaraguan Revolution

The Sandinista Popular Army (SPA) (or People's Army; Ejército Popular Sandinista, EPS) was the revolutionary armed wing and military forces established in 1979 by the new Sandinista government of Nicaragua to replace the Nicaraguan National Guard, following the overthrow of Anastasio Somoza Debayle.

In post-Sandinista Nicaragua, the SPA was reformed into the National Army of Nicaragua. Joaquín Cuadra was named chief of staff, serving Defense Minister Humberto Ortega. A draft, called the Patriotic Military Service (Servicio Militar Patriótico), (SMP) was instituted in 1983. It later became Obligatory Military Service (Servicio Militar Obligatorio) (SMO). The special forces Tropas Pablo Ubeda initially came under the Ministry of Interior and then the BLI'S were Created.

The SPA's ground forces formed the basis of what is now today the Nicaraguan Army Ground Forces (Fuerzas Terrestres del Ejército de Nicaragua), formed in 1995. They report directly to the Commanding General of the Army.

== History ==
=== Sandinista Guerrilla Movement, 1961–79 ===
The Sandanista National Liberation Front (FSLN) was founded in Honduras on July 26, 1961, the eighth anniversary of the launching of the Cuban revolution by Fidel Castro. The FSLN operated at first in the mountainous region that forms the border between Honduras and Nicaragua. Early successes were few, however, and the hardships and sheer effort of surviving led to discontent and desertions. Between 1970 and 1974, the FSLN struggled to broaden its bases of support by conducting guerrilla operations in the countryside while recruiting new supporters in the cities. Its rural guerrilla tactics were patterned after those of Castro's forces, and FSLN forces were trained in Cuba.

For many observers, the FSLN first became a force to be reckoned with when it executed a raid and hostage taking at a reception for the United States ambassador in Managua in December 1974. The Somoza administration was forced to accede to FSLN demands for ransom and political freedom for fourteen FSLN prisoners. The National Guard followed with a major counteroffensive that reduced armed resistance in the countryside. The FSLN remained on the defensive until 1977, but the guard's harsh reprisals caused popular feeling to swing even more toward the Sandinistas.

The seizure of the Nicaraguan National Palace by a small group of Sandinistas in August 1978 sparked a mass uprising in the following month. The uprising was a turning point in the struggle to overthrow Somoza . The FSLN no longer was fighting alone but rather was organizing and controlling a national insurrection. Hard-core Sandinista guerrillas numbered perhaps 2,000 to 3,000; untrained popular militias and foreign supporters added several thousand more to this total. Although the "first offensive" of September 1978 declined toward the end of the year, fighting did not completely stop. The FSLN mounted its "final offensive" in May 1979, capturing a number of cities in June and launching a three-pronged assault against Managua in early July. When Somoza resigned on July 16 and fled the country, the National Guard collapsed two days later.

=== Sandinista People's Army, 1979–90 ===
Sandinista ranks had ballooned during the final weeks of the insurrection with the addition of thousands of untrained and undisciplined volunteers. These self-recruits with access to weapons were the source of considerable crime and violence. By late 1979, the situation was clearly deteriorating, as petty crime mounted and some Sandinistas abused their authority for personal gain.

To end the chaotic situation, FSLN combatants were regrouped into a conventional army framework. At its core were 1,300 experienced guerrilla fighters. Most of the remainder were members of the popular militias and others who had played some role in the defeat of Somoza. Cuban military personnel helped to set up basic and more advanced training programs and to advise the regional commands. The new army, known as the EPS, was placed under the command of Humberto Ortega, one of the nine FSLN commanders and brother of José Daniel Ortega Saavedra, the Sandinista junta coordinator.

The Sandinistas announced initially that their goal was to build a well-equipped professional military of some 25,000. Their primary missions were to deter attacks led by the United States, prevent a counterrevolutionary uprising, and mobilize internal support for the FSLN. The strength of the EPS increased steadily during the Contra war in the 1980s. At the time the peace accords for the Contra War went into effect in 1990, the EPS's active duty members numbered more than 80,000. Supplemented by reservists and militia, the Nicaragua armed forces had an overall fighting strength of more than 125,000.

The buildup of the regular army depended at first on voluntary enlistments, but later in 1983 a universal conscription system, known as Patriotic Military Service, was adopted. Males between the ages of seventeen and twenty-six were obligated to perform two years of active service followed by two years of reserve status. Service by women remained voluntary. Mandatory conscription was bitterly resented. Thousands of youths fled the country rather than serve in the armed forces, and antidraft protests were widespread. The unpopularity of the draft was believed to have been a large factor in the Sandinista election defeat in 1990.

Inheriting only the battered remnants of the equipment of Somoza's National Guard, the Sandinistas eventually acquired enough Soviet heavy and light tanks and armored personnel carriers (APCs) to form five armored battalions. The Soviets and their allies delivered large amounts of other equipment, including 122mm and 155mm howitzers, 122mm multiple rocket launchers, trucks, and tank carriers. A mix of infantry weapons employed by the Sandinista guerrillas was gradually replaced by Soviet AK-47 assault rifles in the EPS and eventually among combat elements of the militia as well.

The Sandinistas upgraded the modest air force left by the National Guard after sending personnel to Cuba and East European countries for pilot and mechanic training. The most important acquisitions were Soviet helicopters for battlefield transport and assault missions. Although pilots were trained and runways constructed in preparation for jet fighters, neither the Soviet Union nor France was willing to extend credits for the purchase of modern MiG or Mirage aircraft. The United States warned that the introduction of sophisticated jet fighters would risk retaliatory strikes because of the potential threat to the Panama Canal. Armed patrol craft and small minesweepers replaced the old patrol boats left by the National Guard, to defend against attacks on harbors and shore installations.

=== Post 1990 ===
Under an agreement between President-elect Violeta Chamorro of the National Opposition Union (Unión Nacional Oppositora—UNO) and the defeated FSLN party, Humberto Ortega remained at the head of the armed forces. By a law that took effect in April 1990, the SLA became subordinate to President Chamorro as commander in chief. Chamorro also retained the Ministry of Defense portfolio. Chamorro's authority over the SLA was, however, very limited. There were no Ministry of Defense offices and no vice ministers to shape national defense policies or exercise civilian control over the armed forces. Under the Law of Military Organization of the SLA enacted just before Chamorro's election victory, Ortega retained authority over promotions, military construction, and force deployments. He contracted for weapons procurement and drafted the military budget presented to the government. Only an overall budget had to be submitted to the legislature, thus avoiding a line-item review by the National Assembly.

Sandinista officers remained at the head of all general staff directorates and military regions. The chief of the army, Major General Joaquín Cuadra Lacayo, continued in his pre-Chamorro position. Facing domestic pressure to remove Humberto Ortega and the risk of curtailment of United States aid as long as Sandinistas remained in control of the armed forces, Chamorro announced that Ortega would be replaced in 1994. Ortega challenged her authority to relieve him and reiterated his intention to remain at the head of the EPS until the army reform program was completed in 1997.

The army reform measures were launched with deep cuts in personnel strengths, the abolition of conscription, and disbanding of the militia. The size of the army declined from a peak strength of 97,000 troops to an estimated 15,200 in 1993, accomplished by voluntary discharges and forced retirements. Under the Sandinistas, the army general staff embodied numerous branches and directorates—artillery, combat readiness, communications, Frontier Guards, military construction, intelligence, counterintelligence, training, operations, organization and mobilization, personnel, and logistics. Most of these bodies appear to have been retained, although they have been trimmed and reorganized. The air force and navy were also subordinate to the army general staff.

Since 1990 the mission of the SLA has been to ensure the security of the national borders and to deal with internal disturbances. Its primary task has been to prevent disorder and violence wrought by armed bands of former Contra and Sandinista soldiers.

In November and December 1992, the SLA was deployed alongside the National Police to prevent violence during demonstrations by the National Workers' Front for improved pay and benefits. The SLA and the Frontier Guards also assist the police in narcotics control. A small EPS contingent works alongside demobilized Contras in a Special Disarmament Brigade to reduce the arsenal of weapons in civilian hands.

== Organization ==
=== Army ===
As of 1993, the army's strength was estimated at 13,500 personnel. The SLA is organized into six regional commands and two military departments subordinate to the general staff. The largest unit is a motorized infantry brigade of four battalions. In addition, there are a mechanized infantry battalion and three artillery battalions. The Irregular Warfare Battalions have been reduced to ten infantry companies. A Special Forces battalion has been formed from airborne and Special Forces personnel. Most of these units are neither fully staffed nor adequately equipped.

The army continues to depend on Soviet weapons delivered during the 1980s. Most of these are out-of-date and poorly maintained. The EPS's inventory of armor—heavy and light tanks, APCs, and reconnaissance vehicles—remains large by Central American standards. However, most of the Soviet T-55 tanks are reportedly in storage because of a lack of funds and personnel to maintain them. The PT-76 light tanks form the primary armor of the mechanized infantry battalion. Only about seventy-five APCs and reconnaissance vehicles are operational, and some of the armored weapons have been sold to other Latin American countries. These are now complemented by the Venezuelan made Tiuna 4X4 armored car.

The army retains a considerable supply of 122mm and 152mm towed artillery pieces and multiple rocket launchers. Twelve of its APCs are mounted with Soviet AT-3 (Sagger) antitank guided missiles. The army retains numerous antitank guns and a stock of Soviet shoulder-fired antiaircraft missile launchers.

==== Units ====
Irregular Warfare Battalions (Batallón de Lucha Irregular)

Recognizing the imperative for skilled troops adept in counterinsurgency tactics and anti-guerrilla warfare, the SLA initiated the deployment of Battalion Light Infantry (BLI) units in 1983. These BLIs constituted specialized forces capable of swift mobilization and sustained operations, particularly in the rugged terrain and dense jungles of Nicaragua where insurgent activity was prevalent.

Operating with agility and endurance, BLIs were tasked with penetrating deep into hostile territories to confront and neutralize insurgent threats, primarily targeting the Contras. Each BLI comprised four to nine companies, typically totaling between 700 and 800 highly trained personnel.Their training begins long before they set foot in the jungle, honing their physical strength, mental fortitude, and tactical prowess. Equipped with specialized gear and weaponry suited for the rugged environment, they embark on their missions with a sense of purpose and determination.

BLI were soldiers in jungle combat and possessed an understanding of the terrain, leveraging it to their advantage.

The recruitment efforts saw hundreds of men voluntarily enlist or were conscripted into these militias, demonstrating a commitment to serve a two-year term in defense of their nation. These soldiers underwent rigorous training to equip them with the skills and resilience necessary to confront the complex challenges posed by insurgent forces in the region.

12 BLI'S were raised :

- Santos Lopez
- Simón Bolívar
- Sócrates Sandino
- Germán Pomares Ordóñez
- Farabundo Martí
- Francisco Estrada
- Germán Pomares Ordóñez
- Juan Gregorio Colindres
- Juan Pablo Umanzor
- Miguel Ángel Ortez
- Pedro Altamirano
- Ramón Raudales
- Rufo Marín

Light Hunter Battalions (Batallón Ligero Cazador, BLC)

The BLCs were another type of counterinsurgency unit, first deployed in early 1986. They were about half the size of the BLIs, at 300-400 men. While BLIs were designed to be able to operate independently, the light hunters worked in conjunction with other units, providing anti-ambush protection for more conventional forces. Reportedly, about 23 BLCs were raised including the following:

- 4009
- 5002
- Carlos Agüero
- Crescencio Rosales
- Cristóbal Vanegas
- Edgar Munguía
- Eduardo Contreras
- Ernesto Cabrera
- Facundo Picado
- Gaspar García Laviana
- Jorge Alberto Martínez
- José Benito Escobar
- Laureano Mairena
- Mario Alemán
- Mauricio Duarte
- Modesto Duarte
- Óscar Benavides
- Óscar Turcios Chavarría
- Pedro Aráuz Palacios
- Ramón Prudencio Serrano
- Reynerio Antonio Tijerino
- Ricardo Morales Avilés
- Rigoberto Cruz

=== Other units of the SPA ===
The SPA ground forces included members of the Frontier Guard, the People's Militia (organized into 18 brigades at its height) and the Self-Defense Workers' Cooperatives.

Aside from the BLIs and BLCs, the SPA also sported the following units:

- Multiple Duty Battalions
- Permanent Territorial Defense Company
- Corps of Engineers
- Medical Corps
- Tactical Battle Groupings composed of:
  - Armored battalions
  - Mechanized Infantry battalions
  - Field artillery battalions
  - Air defense artillery battalions
  - Communications battalions
- Operational Support Bases
- Ground Forces Reserve Battalions (formed in the early 1980s)

==== Equipment ====
- Type 58 assault rifle

=== Air Force ===
When the Sandinistas assumed control in 1979, the Sandinista Air Force/Air Defense Force (Fuerza Aérea Sandinista/Defensa Anti-Aérea—FAS/DAA) inherited only the remnants of the National Guard's small air force. Equipment included a few AT-33A armed jet trainers, Cessna 337s, and some transports, trainers, and helicopters.

The time required to train pilots and construct airfields precluded a rapid FAS/DAA buildup. Beginning in 1982, the Sandinistas received from Libya the Italian-made SF-260A trainer/tactical support aircraft and the Czechoslovak Aero L-39 Albatros, a subsonic jet trainer that could be missile-armed for close-in air defense.

In addition to light and medium transport aircraft, the air force acquired a fleet of helicopters from the Soviet Union that served against the Contras. They included Mi-8 and Mi-17 transport helicopters and later the Mi-24, followed by its export variant, the Mi-25, a modern armored assault helicopter. After Humberto Ortega revealed that Nicaragua had approached France and the Soviet Union for Mirage or MiG fighter planes, the United States warned against introducing modern combat jets to the region. Although Nicaragua began construction of a new airbase with a longer runway and protective revetments, it did not succeed in acquiring new fighter aircraft.

A series of radar sites were constructed to give the Sandinistas radar coverage over most of Nicaragua, with the added capability of monitoring aircraft movements in neighboring countries. A Soviet-designed early-warning/ground-control intercept facility gave the air force the potential to control its combat aircraft from command elements on the ground.

After 1990 the FAS/DAA was no longer able to maintain its full aircraft inventory without Soviet support. The personnel complement fell from 3,000 in 1990 to 1,200 in 1993. Airbases at Bluefields, Montelimar, Puerto Cabezas, Puerto Sandino, and Managua remained operational. Combat aircraft were reduced to a single mixed squadron of Cessna 337s, L-39s, and SF-260As. However, the serviceability of all these aircraft was doubtful. In 1992 a number of helicopters and six radar units were sold to Peru. A small fleet of helicopters, transports, and utility/training aircraft was retained.

=== Navy ===
The "navy" of Somoza's National Guard consisted of a few old patrol boats. The Sandinistas acquired more modern vessels, although none was larger than fifty tons. The navy's mission was to discourage seaborne Contra attacks and to deter CIA-run operations such as the destruction of diesel storage facilities at Corinto in 1983 and the mining of Nicaraguan harbors in 1984. The Sandinista navy (Marina de Guerra Sandinista—MGS), which had reached a peak strength of 3,000 personnel in 1990, suffered a sweeping reduction to 800 by 1993.

The commander of the navy is an SPA officer with the rank of major. The principal bases of the MGS are at the ports of Corinto on the Pacific and Puerto Cabezas on the Caribbean. Other installations are at El Bluff near Bluefields and San Juan del Sur on the Pacific.

The Sandinistas had acquired eight Soviet minesweeping boats, of which seven remained in 1993, but none is known to be in operating condition. Three Soviet Zhuk-class patrol boats are believed to be seaworthy, out of seven that remained at the end of 1990. Also believed to be operational are three North Korean fast patrol boats as well as two Vedette-type boats built in France and armed with Soviet 14.2mm machine guns.

=== Sandinista People's Militia ===
The Nicaraguan government established the Sandinista People's Militia (Milicia Popular Sandinista—MPS) to augment the regular troops. The militia represented both a massive political mobilization and the primary means of defending the countryside against the Contras. Individual militias received weekend training in basic infantry weapons and were assigned as guards in sensitive installations or as neighborhood night watches. A typical militia battalion of 700 persons consisted of five infantry companies and various support units.

The principal weapons of the MPS were older-model rifles and machine guns and mortars. Militia members displaying aptitude during weekend training sessions were selected for several months of full-time training, followed by up to six months of service in the field. During 1982 and 1983, the militia had primary responsibility for border defense and thus sustained heavy casualties, while the regular army was concentrated at permanent bases. After the installation of the draft in 1983 enabled the SPA to widen its operations, the main function of the mobilized militia became the protection of rural communities. The FSLN claimed that 250,000 persons had received some form of military training, of whom 100,000 were mobilized in active units.

=== Women ===
Before Somoza overthrow, women had constituted up to 40 percent of the ranks of the FSLN and 6 percent of the officers. Six women held the rank of guerrilla commander in the late 1970s. After the Sandinista victory, however, women were gradually shifted to noncombatant roles or to the Sandinista Police. Many women fighters resisted the redeployment, and their role became a national issue. As a compromise, seven all-women reserve battalions were formed, but these were gradually converted into mixed battalions. Women's mobilization continued in other forms. Women constituted 50 percent of the Sandinista Defense Committees organized in the neighborhoods and up to 80 percent of Revolutionary Vigilance volunteers, who carried out nighttime patrols in urban neighborhoods and at industrial sites.

== Nicaraguan Army Ground Forces, 1995–present ==
With the transformation of the SPA into the Nicaraguan Army in 1995, the ground forces element became known by its current name – the Nicaraguan Army Ground Forces (Fuerzas Terrestres del Ejército de Nicaragua), formed in 1995. They report directly to the Commanding General of the Army. The militia and the border guard service were both disbanded with the latter forming the Northern and Southern Military Detachments of the Army Ground Forces.

=== Organization ===
- Mechanized Infantry Brigade
- Special Forces Command
- K-9 Battalion
- Ecological Service Battalion
- 1st Military Region
- 2nd Military Region
- 4th Military Region
- 5th Military Region
- 6th Military Region
- Northern Military Detachment
- Southern Military Detachment
- Corps of Engineers
- Search and Rescue Duties Battalion
- Guard Corps

== See also ==
- National Guard (Nicaragua)
- Contras
- Nicaraguan Armed Forces

== Works cited ==
- Merrill, Tim, ed. (1994). Nicaragua: a country study (3rd ed.). Washington, D.C.: Federal Research Division, Library of Congress. ISBN 0-8444-0831-X. OCLC 30623751. This article incorporates text from this source, which is in the public domain.
