= Sin Hung-class hydrofoil torpedo boat =

Class overview
- Operators: Democratic People's Republic of Korea

General characteristics
- Type: Torpedo boat

The Sin Hung-class hydrofoil torpedo boat is a hydrofoil torpedo boat (PTH) in service with the Korean People's Navy. The class is based on the same hull as the Sin Hung-class torpedo boat, and Sin Hung-class patrol boat.

== Construction ==
The Sin Hung class were being built by at least 1984, and possibly before then. Although it appears possible that a non-hydrofoil Sing Hung-hulled torpedo boat could be transformed into hydrophilic ones, there has been no evidence that the Korean People's Navy have built any of them this way.

== Design ==
The hydrophilic Sin Hung class has larger sponsons than the non-hydrofoil Sin Hung class, in order to accommodate the hydrofoil mechanism.
