= Type 68 assault rifle =

Assault rifle made in North Korea derived from the Soviet AKM

Type 68
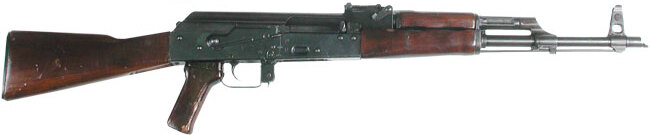
- The Type 68 rifle
- Type: Assault rifle
- Place of origin: North Korea

Service history
- In service: 1968–present
- Used by: See Users
- Wars: Vietnam War; Salvadoran Civil War; Nicaraguan Revolution; United States invasion of Grenada; Syrian Civil War

Production history
- Designer: Mikhail Kalashnikov (Note: Being the inventor/designer of the AKM, which the Type 68 is based on.)
- Manufacturer: Factory 61/65
- Produced: 1968 -

Specifications
- Cartridge: 7.62×39mm
- Action: Gas-operated
- Rate of fire: 600–650 rounds/min
- Feed system: 30-round detachable AK magazines
- Sights: Iron sights

The Type 68 (Korean: 68식자동보총, also known as Type 68 NK) is an assault rifle made in North Korea derived from the Soviet AKM designed by Mikhail Kalashnikov.

== History ==
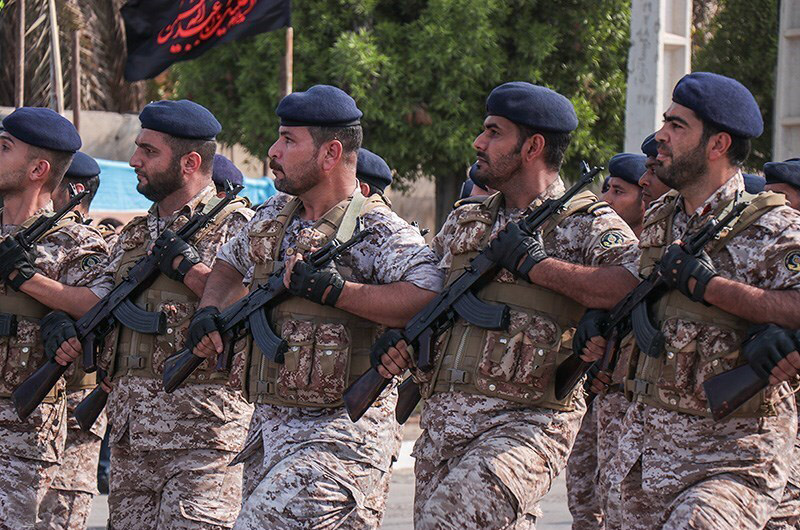
Iranian Navy sailors marching with the Type 68

The Type 68 was adopted in 1968 to replace the Type 58 since it was too time-consuming to produce the Type 58.

The Type 68 was reported to be exported to the Farabundo Martí National Liberation Front covertly in the 1980s. They were also widely distributed in Central and South America.

In 1986 the Peruvian government imported 20,000 Type 68 rifles for US$97 each. (Note: "An obvious political price". Currently at (equivalent to $285 in 2025).) In 1988, 20,000 more were imported and issued to police and paramilitary forces.

== Design ==
The Type 68 was made with features from the Type 58, such as the solid catalpa wood stock, wood pistol grip, handguards and smooth sheet-steel top covers. It has a swivel retaining bracket spot-welded on the left side of the receiver. The pistol grip stud and lower stock tang are riveted in place. The milled gas block is flat on both sides and, like the Type 58, has a sling swivel that extends outward from the left side. The folding stock variant of the Type 68 has the Soviet underfolding design with stamped steel struts and buttplate. The rear sights are graduated to a distance of 800 meters. The trigger group is not based on the Soviet AKM. Instead, the trigger is a double-hook design based on milled receiver-based AKs.

The rifle has a barrel length of 415 mm with a velocity of 715 m/s. Its practical rate of fire is at 40-100 RPM. While it has a sight range of 800 meters, its effective range is at 300 to 400 meters. The Type 68 can also use 20-round magazines aside from 30-round magazines with the capability to fire rifle grenades, based on the PGN-60 and the KGN.

While Type 68s used hangul markings in the fire selectors, exported versions uses non-hangul markings with "1" for semi-auto and an infinity symbol for automatic fire. The markings consist of a five-point star in a circle and "Type 68" in hangul.

Stamped steel magazines were first used, although orange synthetic magazines are reportedly used as well. The Type 68 has a knife bayonet used.

== Variant ==
=== Type 68-1 ===
The Type 68-1 features an underfolding stock like the AKMS with holes in it to help reduce overall weight. It also has the Soviet underfolding design with stamped steel struts and buttplate.

== Users ==
- Cuba: Acquired Type 68s. Provided free of charge due to allegations that the Soviet Union did not want to honor Cuban orders for AK-47s.
- Ethiopia: North Korea provided assistance to set up Type 68 production lines in the 1980s.
- Iran
- Nicaragua: Sandinista Popular Army/Ejército Popular Sandinista. In addition to receiving Type 68s, they also received Type 68 magazine pouches and slings.
- North Korea
- Peru: Type 68, formerly used by paratroopers. Currently used by Peruvian National Police, most refurbished by Desarrollos Industriales Casanave. Around 200 were modernized by DC as of 2012.
- Syria: Imported Type 68 rifles or components prior to the Syrian Civil War. Produced under license in Syria by the Établissement Industriel de la Défense (EID)/Defense Laboratories Corporation (DLC).
- Togo: Type 68.

=== Non-state actors ===
- Farabundo Martí National Liberation Front: Also received Type 68 slings and ammunition pouches, probably from Nicaragua.
- Hamas
- Islamic State: At least 18 Type 68 rifles were found in a weapons stash in northeast Syria in 2022.

== Bibliography ==
- Ezell, Edward Clinton (1988). Small arms today: latest reports on the world's weapons and ammunition (2nd ed.). Harrisburg, PA: Stackpole Books. ISBN 978-0-8117-2280-3.
- Mitzer, Stijn; Oliemans, Joost (2020). The Armed Forces of North Korea: On the Path of Songun. Helion and Company. ISBN 978-1910777145.
- Roodhorst, Cor (2015). The Kalashnikov Encyclopedia: Recognition and Weapon Forensic Guide for Kalashnikov Arms and Derivatives II: Italy-Russia. Netherlands: Roodhorst Publications. ISBN 978-90-9027549-9.
- Tucker-Jones, Anthony (2012). Kalashnikov in Combat. Casemate Publishers. ISBN 978-1-78303-858-9.
