= Rosa Adelina Barahona Castro =

Nicaraguan psychologist and politician (born 1957)

Rosa Adelina Barahona Castro (born 10 May 1957) is a Nicaraguan psychologist and politician who has been the country's Minister of Defence since August 2019.

== Early life and education ==
Barahona Castro was born in Murra, Nueva Segovia on 10 May 1957. She attended the NS Mixed School Center from 1965 until 1969, and then Immaculate Conception School, both in Ocotal. She has a degree in psychology from the Central American University in Managua.

== Career ==
Barahona Castro was a founding member of the Sandinista Popular Army in 1979 and served as head of the Juana Elena Mondoza Women's Company in Esteli, as well as head of the Registration and Control section. She retired in 1992 with the rank of captain. She briefly worked as an independent consultant before taking on a number of roles in the Foundation for Women and Community Economic Development (FUMDEC) including Manager of the Organization and Gender Program from 1997, and Executive Director from 1998 to 2012.

Barahona Castro is a member of the ruling Sandinista National Liberation Front, and on the party's board of directors. She has been member of the National Assembly representing Matagalpa since 2012, after the disputed re-election of Daniel Ortega. She was Deputy FSLN Bank Owner for two legislative periods, from 2012 to 2019. During her time in the Assembly, she did not personally present any bills, but supported FSLN initiatives including Amnesty, reform of the electoral Law and amendments to the Constitution. She was vice president of the Health and Social Security Commission.

Barahona Castro was appointed Minister of Defence by President Ortega on August 19, 2019, replacing Martha Elena Ruiz Sevilla.

As an official of the Government of Nicaragua, Barahona Castro has been officially sanctioned by the United States Department of the Treasury for refusing "to disarm and dismantle" and providing weapons to "the parapolice that committed acts of violence against Nicaraguans." She is a signatory to the manifesto "In defence of Nicaragua, which accuses the US and European countries of a "ruthless campaign of lies and blackmail" against Ortega.

== Personal life ==
Castro is married.
