= Sin Hung-class patrol boat =

Class overview
- Operators: Democratic People's Republic of Korea
- Built: 1984–unknown
- Active: c. 8

General characteristics
- Type: Patrol boat

The Sin Hung-class patrol boat is a class of patrol boats in service with the Korean People's Navy. The class is based on the same hull as the Sin Hung-class hydrofoil torpedo boat, and Sin Hung-class torpedo boat.

== Construction ==
Construction of the Sin Hung class was first noticed in early 1984, when six Sin Hung hulls were seen being built without torpedo tubes or sponsons. A total of eight were seen to be built, all at the Nampo Shipyard. Two of these were sold to Nicaragua in late May of the same year.
