= Type 58 assault rifle =

AK-47-derived North Korean assault rifle

Type 58
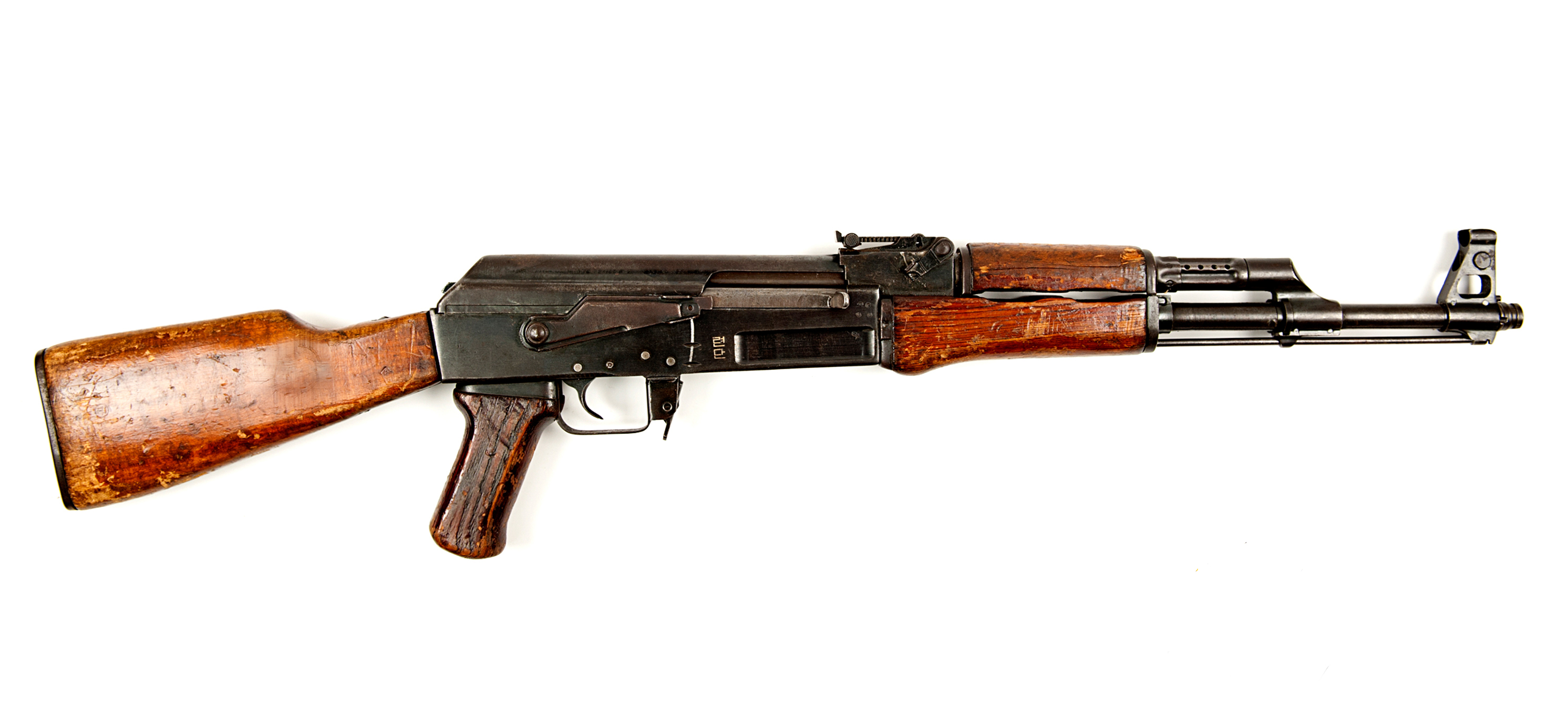
- The Type 58
- Type: Assault rifle
- Place of origin: North Korea

Service history
- In service: 1958–present
- Used by: See Users
- Wars: Vietnam War; Salvadoran Civil War; Nicaraguan Revolution; United States invasion of Grenada

Production history
- Designer: Mikhail Kalashnikov (Note: Being the inventor/designer of the AK-47, which the Type 58 is based on.)
- Manufacturer: Factory 61/65
- Produced: 1958–1968
- No. built: 800,000

Specifications
- Cartridge: 7.62×39mm
- Action: Gas-operated
- Rate of fire: 600–650 rounds/min
- Feed system: 30-round detachable AK magazines
- Sights: Iron sights

- Type 58 assault rifle
- Chosŏn'gŭl: 58식자동보총
- Hancha: 五八式自動步銃
- Revised Romanization: Opalsik jadongbochong
- McCune–Reischauer: Op'alsik chadongboch'ong

The Type 58 (Korean: 58식자동보총) is an assault rifle made in North Korea derived from the Soviet AK-47 designed by Mikhail Kalashnikov. This was the first weapon made in North Korea alongside the PPSh-41, made under license as the Type 49. It was made in Factory 61 and 65 in Chongjin.

== History ==
After the Korean War (1950–1953), North Korea was allied with the Soviet Union and continued to receive military support from them throughout the Cold War. President Kim Il Sung ordered the fabrication of the Type 58. The assault rifle was first produced in 1958. These were made initially with Soviet components until the North Koreans were able to make the parts on their own.

Before production of the Type 58 ceased, it's reported that around 800,000 were made. North Korea turned production towards the Type 68 in 1968 since it was too time-consuming to make the Type 58.

The Type 58 was exported to Cuba and Vietnam in the 1960s before it showed up in parts of Africa, the Middle East and South America. The Maltese government signed two secret arms deals with North Korea in March and July 1982, which included the provision of Type 58 rifles.

== Design ==
While the Type 58 is based on the AK-47 with the milled receiver, the difference between the two assault rifles is that the former has identifying marks such as the five-point star in a circle and Type 58 in Hangul. The Type 58 has a firing rate at 600-650 RPM.

The Type 58's quality of bluing varies, usually ranging from average to poor. The Type 58 can use 20-round magazines aside from 30-round magazines with the capability to fire rifle grenades, based on the PGN-60 and the KGN.

Initial production models were not made with bayonet lugs. Later models were produced with said bayonet lugs. The Type 58 has a knife bayonet used.

== Variants ==
=== Type 58-1 ===
A variant of the Type 58 with a folding stock.

== Users ==
- Cuba: Known to have the Type 58 in the 1960s. Provided free of charge due to allegations that the Soviet Union did not want to honor Cuban orders for AK-47s.
- Grenada: Recovered by US troops after Operation Urgent Fury.
- North Korea
- Malta: Received Type 58 rifles in 1982.
- Nicaragua: Sandinista Popular Army/Ejército Popular Sandinista. In addition to receiving Type 58s, they also received Type 68 magazine pouches and slings.
- Vietnam: Reported to be used by the former North Vietnamese military in the 1960s.

=== Non-State Actors ===
- Hamas
