= Humberto Ortega =

Nicaraguan military leader (1947–2024)

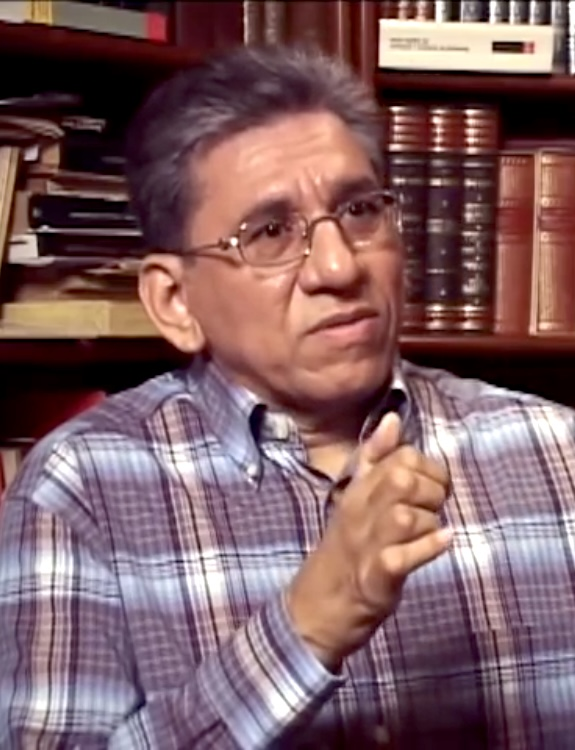
- Ortega in 2005
- Born: 10 January 1947; La Libertad, Nicaragua
- Died: 30 September 2024 (aged 77); Managua, Nicaragua
- Office: Minister of Defense of Nicaragua (1980–1995)
- Political party: Sandinista National Liberation Front
- Spouse: Ligia Trejos Leiva
- Children: 5
- Relatives: Daniel Ortega and Camilo Ortega (brothers)

Humberto Ortega Saavedra (10 January 1947 – 30 September 2024) was a Nicaraguan revolutionary, military leader, writer and businessman. One of the nine members of the National Directorate of the Sandinista National Liberation Front (FSLN), he co-founded the Tercerista tendency faction within the FSLN and was the "major theorist" of the urban insurrection strategy that toppled the Somoza family dictatorship. A four-star general, Ortega was minister of defense from 1980 to 1995, between the victory of the Sandinista revolution in 1979 under the National Reconstruction Government, through the first presidency of his brother Daniel Ortega, and into the presidency of Violeta Chamorro who defeated Daniel Ortega in 1990. He was also chief of the army, overseeing its transformation from the partisan Sandinista Popular Army (EPS) to the professionalized Nicaraguan Armed Forces under civilian control. Later in life he spoke out against repression by his brother's government (back in power since 2007). Hours after a May 2024 interview in which he sharply criticized his brother, Humberto Ortega was placed under house arrest. The following month, he was transferred to a military hospital where he died in September 2024.

== Early life ==
Humberto Ortega Saavedra was born in La Libertad, a mining town in the Chontales Department of central Nicaragua on 10 January 1947. His parents Daniel Ortega Cerda and Lidia Saavedra, committed Nicaraguan nationalists, had six children: Humberto, Daniel Ortega, Camilo Ortega (1950–1978), Germania and two more who died in infancy. The family moved to Managua in the 1950s. Humberto Ortega taught Catholic catechism classes in Managua as a youth before repudiating Christianity. He also led the Nicaraguan Patriotic Youth (JPN).

== Career ==
=== Sandinista Revolution ===
Ortega founded the Sandinista Brigades in 1962, then formally joined the Sandinista National Liberation Front (FSLN) in 1965. He and other Brigade members were suspended from the FSLN for eight months for "ultra-leftist tendencies," including unauthorized military actions. In 1969 he was wounded in the arm in an attempt to free commander Carlos Fonseca from a Costa Rican prison. Ortega was jailed, then freed with Fonseca in October 1970 as a result of an FSLN hijacking of an airliner, led by Carlos Agüero. Fonseca and Ortega flew to Havana where they were welcomed as heroes. Ortega next went to the Soviet Union for a year, where he worked on rehabilitating his arm and developing his contacts with the Soviets, before returning to Cuba. During his time there he became close to Cuban leader Fidel Castro.

In 1971, Ortega was part of an FSLN delegation with Fonseca, Agüero and Rufo Marín that received General Staff military training in North Korea. He reportedly also trained in Palestine Liberation Organization military camps in the mid-East in the mid-1970s.

Ortega, his brother, Daniel Ortega, and Víctor Tirado founded the Tercerista tendency of the FSLN in 1975. Humberto Ortega was "major theorist" of the urban insurrection strategy that ignited civil war in Nicaragua in October 1977, leading to the fall of the Somoza dynastic dictatorship in July 1979. In the interim, his brother Camilo was killed in battle in 1978 and in March 1979 Humberto was named to the nine-member National Directorate brokered by Castro to lead the FSLN.

=== Government ===
When the FSLN took power, Ortega became chief of the Sandinista Popular Army (EPS), beginning in October 1979, and defense minister (January 1980). As of 1988, he was the army's only four-star general. During the decade of Sandinista rule, he oversaw the buildup of the EPS, making military service compulsory and mobilizing 320,000 people, as he prosecuted the war against the U.S-backed Contras.

Following the 1990 electoral defeat of Daniel Ortega and the Sandinista Party, Humberto Ortega continued on as head of the army in the Violeta Chamorro administration for five years, transforming the EPS into the non-political Nicaraguan National Army subject to civilian control. He retired in 1995, turning the job over to his second in command, Joaquín Cuadra, in the country's first peaceful transfer of control of the military.

After his security detail shot and killed a 16-year-old in 1990, in 1994 a military tribunal acquitted Ortega of allegations he was involved in a cover-up.

=== Writing and business ===
A member of the Nicaraguan Academy of Geography and History, over the course of his career and after retiring from the military, Ortega also published books about Nicaraguan history and the Sandinista struggle, such as his 2004 work on the fall of the Somoza regime, La epopeya de la insurrección (Epic of the Insurrection). This elaborated on his thesis of "El Centrismo", having turned toward centrism in later years.

After leaving the military, he also devoted himself to his business interests. In 1996, he remarked he wasn't leaving government "on a bicycle", in reference to the fortune he had amassed, a departure from earlier views like a 1981 threat to "hang the bourgeoisie from the light posts".

In this period he divided his time between Nicaragua and Costa Rica.

== Criticism of Daniel Ortega and house arrest ==
Ortega spoke out on the "indiscriminate repression" of his brother's government in response to the anti-government protests that began in April 2018, killing at least 355 people, and spoke out again against the arrests of 168 opposition figures in 2019. In response, Daniel Ortega indirectly accused his brother of being a "homeland sell-out" and of "defending terrorists," without, however, mentioning his name.

In May 2024, Ortega was stripped of his communication devices, given a police summons, and placed under house arrest following the publication of an interview with Infobae during which he described his brother's regime as "authoritarian, dictatorial" and said there was no one to take power when Daniel dies, including his wife and vice president Rosario Murrillo. Ortega also said he was targeted for assassination because of his criticism of the regime. Prior to house arrest, Ortega had been receiving medical care at a private hospital in Managua.

In June, an audio message from Ortega was smuggled out to the press. He described himself as a political prisoner and said he thought the imprisonment could kill him at any time.

== Personal life and death ==
Ortega was married to Ligia Trejos Leiva, the Costa Rican widow of his best friend and comrade Carlos Aguero. Trejos's daughter with Aguero, Elízabeth, later adopted the surname Ortega. In total, Ortega and Trejos had five children, the others being David, Luisa Amanda, Óscar Humberto and Mariana. Mariana was a finalist for Miss Nicaragua in 2004.

Ortega died at the Dr. Alejandro Dávila Bolaños Military Hospital in Managua on 30 September 2024, at the age of 77. He had suffered from heart problems, and had been hospitalized since 12 June 2024.

== Bibliography ==
- 50 años de lucha sandinista (1978)
- Sobre la insurrección (1981)
- Nicaragua: revolución y democracia (1992)
- La epopeya de la insurrección (2004)

Political offices
Preceded by Position Created (José Trinidad Muñoz in 1847)	Commander-in-Chief of the Army; 1979–1995	Succeeded by Joaquín Cuadra
