= Nicaraguan Air Force =

Air warfare branch of Nicaragua's military

- Fuerza Aérea Nicaragüense
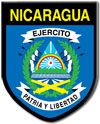
- Founded: 1938
- Country: Nicaragua
- Branch: Air Force
- Size: 17 aircraft
- Part of: Nicaraguan Armed Forces
- Colors: Red, Black and yellow
- Anniversaries: 31 July

Insignia
- Former Roundel 1979-1990

- Former roundel (1936–1980)

Aircraft flown
- Utility helicopter: Mi-17
- Trainer: Cessna 185, Cessna T-41D
- Transport: An-26, Cessna 337, PA-28

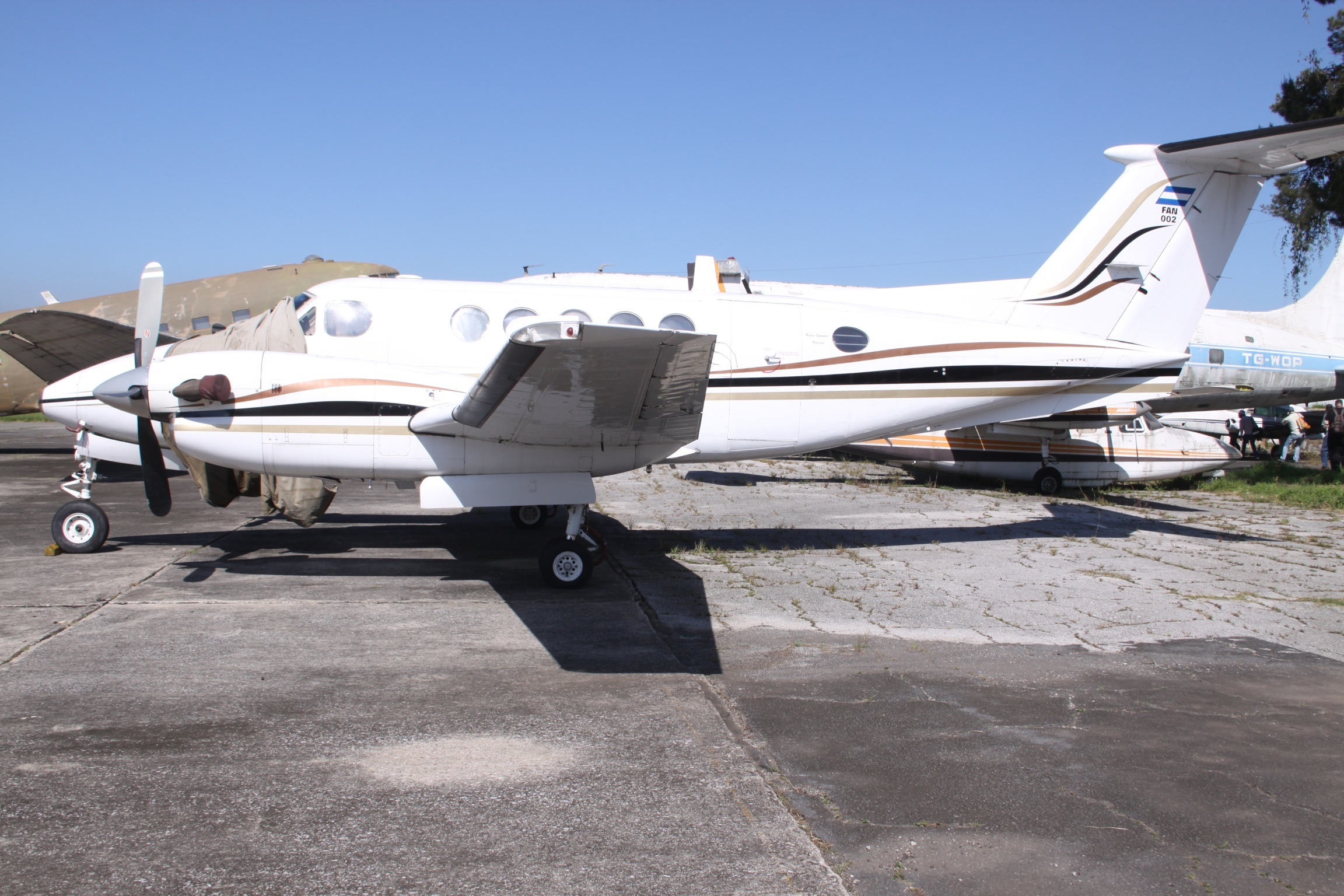
A Nicaraguan Beechcraft King Air sits on the tarmac at La Aurora International Airport

The Nicaraguan Air Force (Spanish: Fuerza Aérea Nicaragüense) is the air defense branch of the armed forces of Nicaragua. It continues the former Sandinista air units. Before 1979 the Nicaraguan National Guard had some air units (Fuerza Aérea de la Guardia Nacional).

== Air force ==
In 1920, the National Guard received from the United States its first four aircraft, four Curtiss JN-4.

In 1927 the first use of aircraft in combat took place in the country – on July 5 during the Battle of Ocotal five American Airco DH.4 aircraft attacked the forces of General Augusto Sandino.

The "Nicaraguan National Guard Air Force" (Fuerza Aérea de la Guardia Nacional) was formed in 1938. From 1942 small numbers of trainers and transports were acquired from the United States and by 1945 a total of 20 aircraft were on strength. In 1952 a US aviation mission arrived and saw an increase of the numbers of trainers and transports delivered followed by combat aircraft such as the P-38, P-51 and P-47. For some years the Nicaraguan air force was the strongest in Central America but after the 1979 civil war most of its US trained pilots defected and thereafter much eastern bloc equipment was acquired.

When the Sandinistas assumed control in 1979, the Sandinista Air Force/Air Defense Force (Fuerza Aérea Sandinista/Defensa Anti-Aérea—FAS/DAA) inherited only the remnants of the National Guard's small air force. Equipment included a few AT-33A armed jet trainers, Cessna 337s, and some transports, trainers, and helicopters. The time required to train pilots and construct airfields precluded a rapid FAS/DAA buildup. Beginning in 1982, the Sandinistas received from Libya the Italian-made SF-260A trainer/tactical support aircraft and the Czechoslovak Aero L-39 Albatros, a subsonic jet trainer that could be missile-armed for close-in air defense. In addition to light and medium transport aircraft, the air force acquired a fleet of helicopters from the Soviet Union that served as a vital asset in the war against the Contras. They included Mi-8 and Mi-17 transport helicopters and later the Mi-24, followed by its export variant, the Mi-25, a modern armored assault helicopter. After Humberto Ortega revealed that Nicaragua had approached France and the Soviet Union for Mirage 50 or MiG fighter planes, the United States warned against introducing modern combat jets to the region. Although Nicaragua began construction of a new airbase with a longer runway and protective revetments, it did not succeed in acquiring new fighter aircraft.

A series of radar sites were constructed to give the Sandinistas radar coverage over most of Nicaragua, with the added capability of monitoring aircraft movements in neighboring countries. A Soviet-designed early-warning/ground-control intercept facility gave the air force the potential to control its combat aircraft from command elements on the ground.

After 1990 the FAS/DAA was no longer able to maintain its full aircraft inventory without Soviet support. The personnel complement fell from 3,000 in 1990 to 1,200 in 1993. Airbases at Bluefields, Montelimar, Puerto Cabezas, Puerto Sandino, and Managua remained operational. Combat aircraft were reduced to a single mixed squadron of Cessna 337s, L-39s, and SF-260As. However, the serviceability of all these aircraft was doubtful. In 1992 a number of helicopters and six radar units were sold to Peru. A small fleet of helicopters, transports, and utility/training aircraft was retained. In 1996 the Nicaraguan air force changed its name from Fuerza Aérea Sandinista to the Fuerza Aérea Nicaragüense (FAN). In 2015 it was reported by some online sources that the FAN intended to acquire a number of Mikoyan MiG-29 fighters for air defense purposes. However, as of 2022 this has not taken place.

== Aircraft ==
=== Current inventory ===
Aircraft	Origin	Type	In service	Notes
Transport
Antonov An-26	Soviet Union	Transport	4	
Beechcraft King Air 90	United States	Utility	1	
Helicopters
Bell 206	United States	Utility	1	
Mil Mi-17	Soviet Union	Utility	2	
Mil Mi-8	Soviet Union	Utility	8	
Trainer aircraft
Robinson R44	United States	Trainer	1	

=== Retired aircraft ===
Previous aircraft operated by the Air Force consisted of the Aero L-39 Albatros, Antonov An-2, Beechcraft Model 18, C-212 Aviocar, Consolidated PBY-5, Consolidated B-24, Douglas C-47, Grumman TBF, Hughes OH-6A Defender, AT-33A, Mikoyan MiG-17, Mikoyan MiG-21, Mil Mi-2, North American P-51 Mustang, North American AT-28D Trojan and SIAI SF-260W.

== Bibliography ==
- Hagedorn, Daniel P. (September–October 1996). "Talkback". Air Enthusiast (65): 80. ISSN 0143-5450.
- World Aircraft Information files BrightStar publishing London File 342 Sheet 3
