= Sin Hung-class torpedo boat =

Class overview
- Operators: Democratic People's Republic of Korea
- Built: ??–1983
- Active: c. 120

General characteristics
- Type: Torpedo boat
- Armament: 2 × 533 mm (21 in) torpedoes

The Sin Hung-class torpedo boat is a class of torpedo boats in service with the Korean People's Navy. The class is based on the same hull as the Sin Hung-class hydrofoil torpedo boat, and Sin Hung-class patrol boat.

== Construction ==
The Sin Hung-class torpedo boats stopped being produced in 1983. The Korean People's Navy has at least 120 of them.

== Specifications ==
The Sin Hung class are 19.8 metres (65.0 ft) long, with a beam of 3.4 metres (11.2 ft) and a draught of 1.7 metres (5.6 ft). They displace 25 t full load. Two diesel engines rated at 2,400 brake horsepower (1,800 kW) each propel the boats, giving a speed of 40 knots (74 km/h). The normal armament consists of two 450-millimetre (18 in) torpedo tubes, although some ships carry 533-millimetre (21 in) torpedo tubes instead, with a gun armament of two twin 14.5 millimetres (0.57 in) machine guns.

== Service history ==
During a naval drill off Nampo by the Korean People's Navy on October 5, 2016, five Sin Hung-class torpedo boats were part of the 80 some training fleet.

== Sources ==
- Baker, A.D. (1998). The Naval Institute Guide to Combat Fleets of the World 1998–1999. Annapolis, Maryland, USA: Naval Institute Press. ISBN 1-55750-111-4.
- Gardiner, Robert; Chumbley, Stephen, eds. (1995). Conway's All The World's Fighting Ships 1947–1995. Annapolis, Maryland USA: Naval Institute Press. ISBN 1-55750-132-7.
