= Miss Grand Nicaragua =

National beauty pageant in Nicaragua

- Abbreviation: MGN
- Formation: 8 August 2021; 5 years ago
- Headquarters: León
- Official language: Spanish
- Miss Grand Nicaragua 2026: Nahomy Hill
- President: Eli Zamora
- Parent organization: Eli Zamora (2026–present); Benitours (2019–2025); Miss Nicaragua (2016–2017); Miss Mundo Nicaragua (2014)
- Affiliations: Miss Grand International

Miss Grand Nicaragua is an annual national women's beauty pageant in Nicaragua founded by a León-based businessman Saúl Benítez in 2020, aiming to select the country's representative to compete at Miss Grand International. Formerly, throughout 2014–2017, the license of the contest belonged to Miss Mundo Nicaragua and Miss Nicaragua but the country representatives were either appointed or determined through the main contest of such organizations.

María Alejandra Gross Rivera, from Managua, was the first ever Miss Grand Nicaragua. The reining Miss Grand Nicaragua is Nahomy Hill Martínez from the South Caribbean Coast. She will represent Nicaragua at Miss Grand International 2026 in Thailand, in October 2026.

== Background ==
=== History ===
Nicaragua competed at Miss Grand International for the first time in 2014, by María Alejandra Gross, the appointed representative from Managua. In 2016, the Miss Nicaragua, headed by Karen Celebertti, had obtained the license for the 2016–2017, then the country representatives were elected via such a national competition. After an absence in 2018, the León-based designer Saúl Benítez later purchased the license in the following year, however, his first two affiliated titleholders – Vanessa Baldizón and Teresa Moreno – were designated without organizing the contest, both of them were the national finalists of Miss Nicaragua 2017.

In 2021, Benítez ran the first Miss Grand Nicaragua contest on 8 August at José de la Cruz Mena Municipal Theater of the León city, aiming to determine the country's representatives for the 2021 and 2022 editions of Miss Grand International. The contest consisted of 9 candidates from 7 departments, including Boaco, Granada, León, Managua, RACCN, RACCS, and Río San Juan, of which, both Managua and the RACCN sent two delegates to take part. In the final round, Epifanía Solís of Managua and Maycrin Jáenz of Granada were announced Miss Grand Nicaragua 2021 and 2022, respectively.

Since the debutant in 2014, to date, none of Nicaragua's representatives have qualified for the further round on the international stage. However, the 2021 candidate, Epifanía Solís, was placed among the top 10 best in a swimsuit competition, one of the sub-contests in the 2021 Miss Grand International pageant.

== Editions ==
=== Date and venue ===
Year	Edition	Date	Venue	Entrants	Ref.
2021	1st	8 August	José de la Cruz Mena Municipal Theater, León	9	
2023	2nd	24 May	Holiday Inn Managua Convention Center, Managua	12	
2025	3rd	3 August	Holiday Inn Managua Convention Center, Managua	12	

=== Results ===
Year	Miss Grand Nicaragua	Vice queens						Ref.
Year	Miss Grand Nicaragua	2nd Place	3rd Place	4th Place	5th Place	6th Place	7th Place	Ref.
2021	Epifanía Solís (Note: As Miss Grand Nicaragua 2021) (Managua)	Magdalena Jarquín (RACCN)	Krizzia Chang (RACCS)	Mayela Chamorro (Río San Juan)	Not awarded			
2021	Maycrin Jáenz (Note: As Miss Grand Nicaragua 2022) (Granada)	Magdalena Jarquín (RACCN)	Krizzia Chang (RACCS)	Mayela Chamorro (Río San Juan)	Not awarded			
2023	Glennys Medina (Rivas)	Gabriela Saballos (Managua)	Yolaina Guillén (Madriz)	Lisseth Palacios (Masaya)	Keytel Price (RACCS)	Esther Ruiz (León)	Mayerlin Sánchez (Carazo)	
2025	Daniesca Granja (Chontales)	Dayami Izaguirre (Note: As Miss Mesoamérica Nicaragua 2025) (Nueva Segovia)	Ilse Castellanos (Note: As Miss Earth Nicaragua 2025) (Nueva Segovia)	Solange Velásquez (Chinandega)	Maydiell Tórrez (Matagalpa)	Diana Sandino (Granada)	Yaren Castro (Chinandega)	

== International competition ==
The following is a list of Nicaragua representatives at the Miss Grand International contest.

Color keys

- : Declared as the winner
- : Ended as a runner-up (Top 5)
- : Ended as a finalist (Top 10)
- : Ended as a semifinalist (Top 20/21)
- : Ended as special awards winner

Year	Department	Miss Grand Nicaragua	National qualification	Placement	Special Awards	National Director
2026	South Caribbean Coast	Nahomy Hill Martínez	Appointed	Unplaced		Eli Zamora
2025	Chontales	Daniesca Granja	Miss Grand Nicaragua 2025	Unplaced		Saúl Benítez
2024	Chinandega	Isabella Salgado	2nd runner-up Miss Nicaragua 2023	Unplaced		Saúl Benítez
2023	Rivas	Glennys Medina	Miss Grand Nicaragua 2023	Unplaced		Saúl Benítez
2022	Granada	Maycrin Jáenz	Miss Grand Nicaragua 2022	Unplaced		Saúl Benítez
2021	Managua	Epifanía Solís	Miss Grand Nicaragua 2021	Unplaced		Saúl Benítez
2020	León	Teresa Moreno	Miss Nicaragua 2017 Finalist	Unplaced		Saúl Benítez
2019	León	Vanessa Baldizón	Miss Nicaragua 2017 Finalist	Unplaced		Saúl Benítez
2018	Managua	Laura Ramírez	Top 6 Miss Nicaragua 2018	Did not compete		Karen Celebertti
2017	Estelí	Martha Meza	2nd runner-up Miss Nicaragua 2017	Unplaced	Top 20 in best national costume	Karen Celebertti
2016	Carazo	Michelle Lacayo	Top 7 Miss Nicaragua 2016	Unplaced		Karen Celebertti
Did not compete in 2015
2014	Managua	Alejandra Gross	Appointed	Unplaced	Top 20 in Best national costume	Denis Dávila

== Titleholder gallery ==
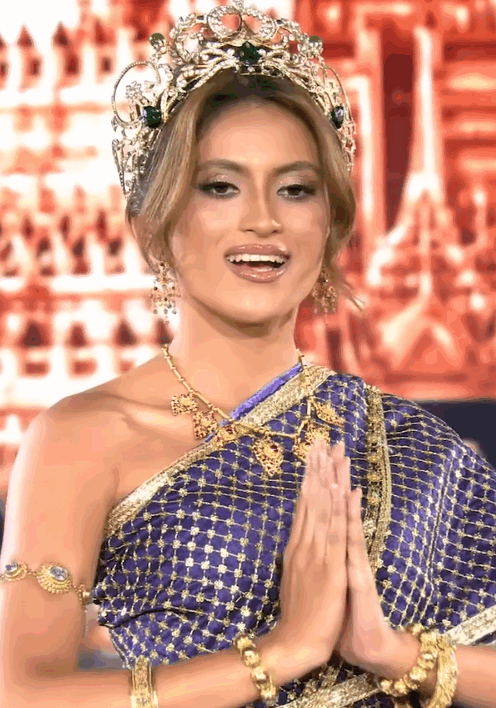
Miss Grand Nicaragua 2025
Daniesca Granja
(Managua)

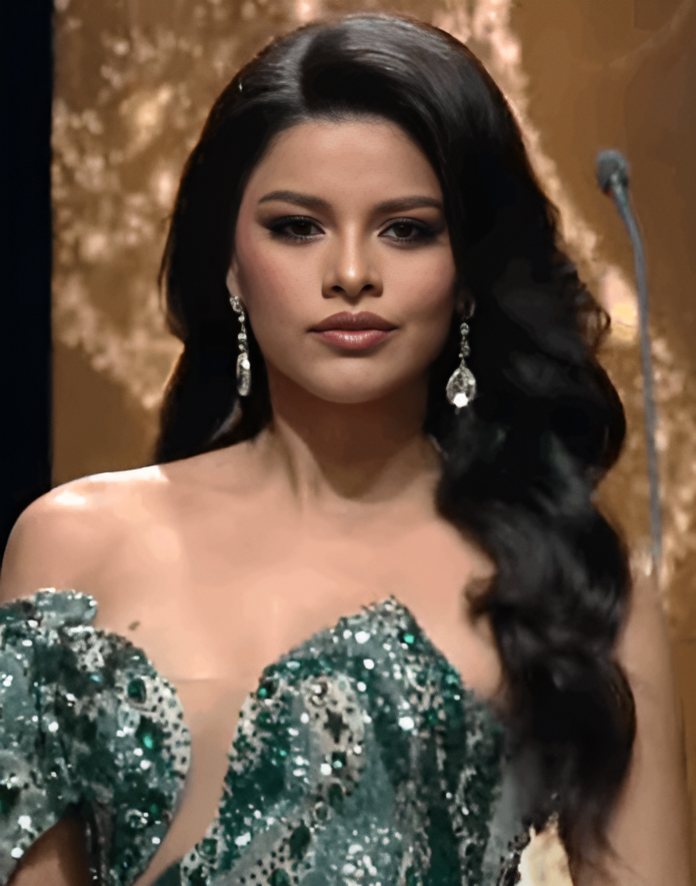
Miss Grand Nicaragua 2024
Isabella Salgado
(Chinandega)

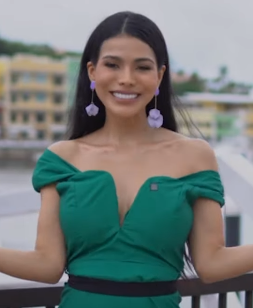
Miss Grand Nicaragua 2023
Glennys Medina
(Rivas)

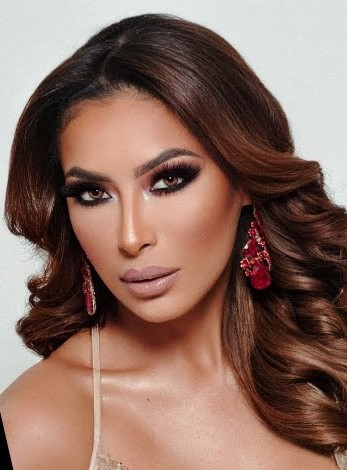
Miss Grand Nicaragua 2022
Maycrin Jáenz
(Granada)

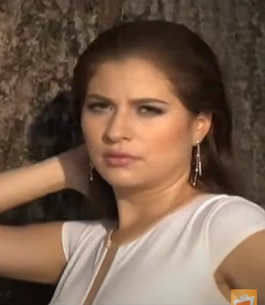
Miss Grand Nicaragua 2020
Teresa Moreno
(León)

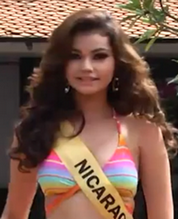
Miss Grand Nicaragua 2014
Alejandra Gross
(Managua)

=== Regional rankings ===
Department	Titles	Years
Managua	3	2014; 2018; 2021
León	2	2019; 2020
Carazo	1	2016
Chinandega	1	2024
Chontales	1	2025
Estelí	1	2017
Granada	1	2022
Rivas	1	2023
South Caribbean Coast	1	2026
