= Miss Grand Nicaragua 2025 =

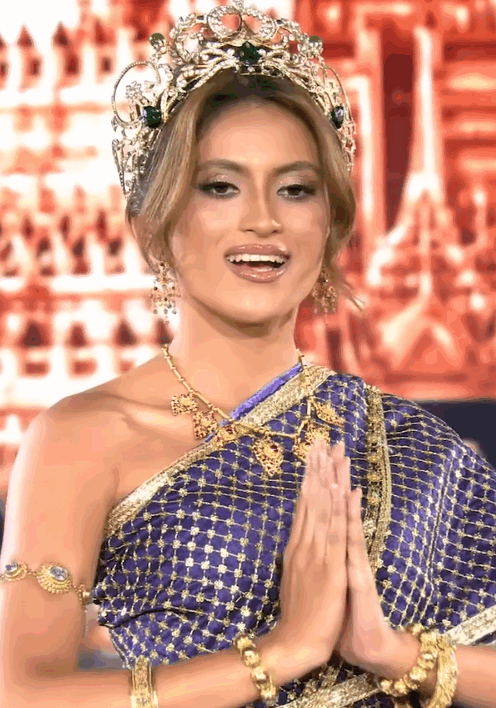
- Daniesca Granja, the winner of the contest
- Date: 3 August 2025
- Venue: Holiday Inn Managua Convention Center, Managua
- Broadcaster: YouTube, Facebook Live
- Entrants: 12
- Placements: 7
- Winner: Daniesca Granja (Chontales)
- Congeniality: Dayami Izaguirre (Nueva Segovia)
- Photogenic: Maydiell Tórrez (Matagalpa)

External videos
- Grand final round

Miss Grand Nicaragua 2025 was the 3rd Miss Grand Nicaragua pageant, held on 3 August 2025 at the Holiday Inn Managua Convention Center in Managua. Constants from 12 departments and autonomous regions of the country competed for the title.

The contest was won by Daniesca Granja, representing Chontales Department, making her eligible to represent Nicaragua internationally at the Miss Grand International 2025, to be held in Bangkok, Thailand, on 18 October 2025.

In addition to the Miss Grand titleholder, the country representatives for Miss Earth 2025 and Miss Mesoamerica 2025 were also named at the event.

== Selection of contestants ==
The competition licenses were distributed to local organizers who then named the representatives for their respective departments via regional contests, auditions, or hand-pickings. Only two departments organized the regional pageants for this year's edition, detailed as follows.

| Pageant | Edition | Date | Final venue | Entrants | Ref. |
|---|---|---|---|---|---|
| Miss Grand Carazo | 1st | 31 May 2025 | La Residencia Inn, Jinotepe | 5 | |
| Miss Grand Chinandega | 1st | 1 June 2025 | Hotel Farallones, Chinandega | 9 | |

== Result ==
Miss Grand Nicaragua 2025 competition result by department
Color key:
| Main winner | Supplemental winner |
| 1st Runner-up | 2nd Runner-up |
| 3rd Runner-up | 4th Runner-up |
| Unplaced | Did not compete |

| Position | Delegate |
|---|---|
| Miss Grand Nicaragua 2025 | Chontales – Daniesca Granja |
| Miss Mesoamérica Nicaragua 2025 | Nueva Segovia I – Dayami Izaguirre |
| Miss Earth Nicaragua 2025 | Nueva Segovia II – Ilse Castellanos |
| 1st runner-up | Chinandega II – Solange Velásquez |
| 2nd runner-up | Matagalpa – Maydiell Tórrez |
| 3rd runner-up | Granada – Diana Sandino |
| 4th runner-up | Chinandega I – Yaren Castro |
Special awards
| Best Hair | Chontales – Daniesca Granja |
| Best Face | Chinandega I – Yaren Castro |
| Best Body | Chontales – Daniesca Granja |
| Miss Influencer | Granada – Diana Sandino |
| Miss Photogenic | Chinandega I – Yaren Castro |
| Miss Congeniality | Nueva Segovia I – Dayami Izaguirre |
| Miss Grand Virtual | Matagalpa – Maydiell Tórrez |
| Miss Belleza Integral | Matagalpa – Maydiell Tórrez |
| Miss Photogenic Amorus | Matagalpa – Maydiell Tórrez |
| Best Ecological Project | Jinotega – Reina Chavarría |
| Best in Make-up Challenge | Costa Caribe Norte – Janery Lampson |

== Contestants ==
| Department | Candidate |
|---|---|
| Carazo | Shadday García |
| Chinandega I | Yaren Castro |
| Chinandega II | Solange Velásquez |
| Chontales | Daniesca Granja |
| Costa Caribe Norte | Janery Lampson |
| Granada | Diana Sandino |
| Jinotega | Reina Chavarría |
| León | Ashley Romero |
| Managua | Angeline Mendoza |
| Matagalpa | Maydiell Tórrez |
| Nueva Segovia I | Dayami Izaguirre |
| Nueva Segovia II | Ilse Castellanos |

== List of regional directors ==
The following is the list of accredited local organizers for the Miss Grand Nicaragua 2025 competition.

- Chinandega – Nyron Palacios
- Chontales – Óscar Zelaya
- Costa Caribe – Carlos Aguinaga Hernández
- León – Freddy Ramírez Cuadra
- Managua – Carlos Gómez
- Matagalpa – Frank Rivera
