= Amphilophus zaliosus =

Conservation status
- Critically Endangered (IUCN 3.1)

Scientific classification
- Kingdom: Animalia
- Phylum: Chordata
- Class: Actinopterygii
- Division: Teleostei
- Order: Cichliformes
- Family: Cichlidae
- Genus: Amphilophus
- Species: A. zaliosus

Binomial name
- Amphilophus zaliosus (Barlow, 1976)

Synonyms
- Cichlasoma zaliosum Barlow, 1976

Species of fish

Amphilophus zaliosus is a species of cichlid that inhabits Lake Apoyo in Nicaragua. It is known in the aquarium trade as the arrow cichlid. It is an elongate species in the Midas cichlid species complex. The arrow cichlid shares its habitat with five other recently discovered species of this complex.

Genetic evidence from Apoyo supports a hypothesis that the six known species of the lake evolved via sympatric speciation.

== Appearance ==
The yellow background color, common among the Amphilophus cichlids of Nicaragua, is absent in the arrow cichlid. The background color is silver to greenish gray. Breeding specimens can be entirely black.

== Conservation ==
The arrow cichlid is the only endemic Lake Apoyo cichlid that has been evaluated by the IUCN. It has been rated as Critically Endangered on the IUCN Red List. Among the small body of information regarding populations of the species of this group, four other species may have smaller populations and/or ranges than this fish in Lake Apoyo: Amphilophus flaveolus, A. chancho, A. supercilius, and A. globosus. The final member of the complex, A. astorquii, constitutes about eighty percent of the native cichlid breeding population in the lake.
