= Diriá, Nicaragua =

Municipality in Granada Department, Nicaragua

Diriá
- Municipality
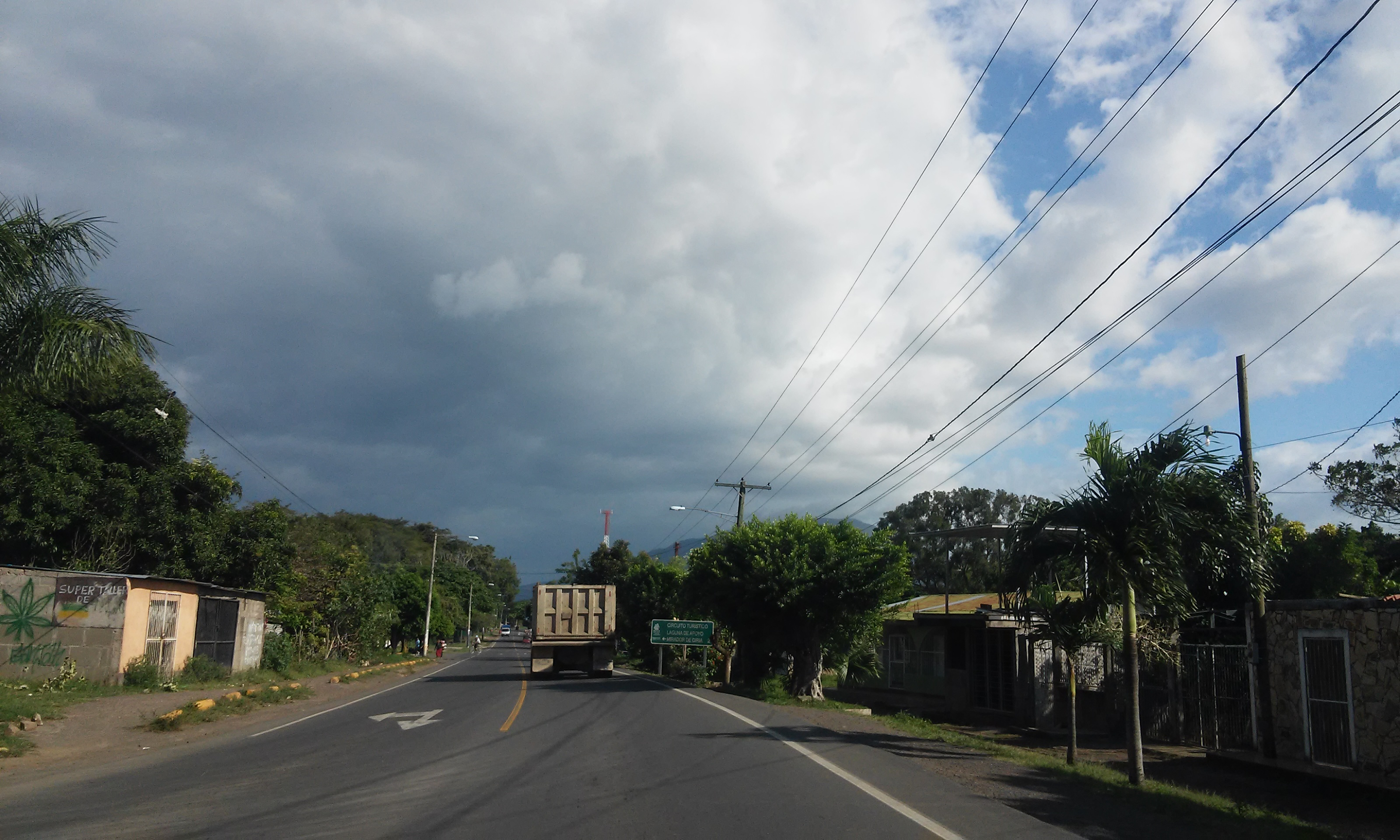
- The municipality is crossed by the Nandaime Highway.

- Location in Nicaragua
- Coordinates: 11°53′N 86°03′W
- Country: Nicaragua
- Department: Granada

Area
  - Municipality: 10 sq mi (26 km^{2})

Population (2005)
  - Municipality: 6,375
  - Urban: 3,579
- Climate: Aw

Diriá is a municipality in the Granada department of Nicaragua.

== Toponymy ==
Diriá is a place name of Mangue origin that means Green Hills.

== Geography ==
The municipal area limits to the north with the municipality of San Juan de Oriente and the Laguna de Apoyo, to the south with the municipality of Nandaime, to the east with the municipalities of Diriomo and Granada and to the west with the municipalities of Niquinohomo and La Paz de Carazo. The municipal seat is located 64 kilometers from the capital of Managua. The municipal territory is considered strictly broken and irregular, it has some mountain ranges such as Cerro de la Flor, Cerro de las Ardillas and Cerro Las Piedras; It is located in the upper northern part of the Apoyo Lagoon, which gives rise to three small springs or waterholes such as the Limón River, Chiquita and Las Pilas.

== History ==
Populated by Chorotega Indians, Diriá is one of the many indigenous communities that already existed before the time of the Spanish conquest of Nicaragua. The priest Fray Francisco de Bobadilla visited and described the place in 1528. At the country's first census in 1548, Diriá had 1,346 inhabitants.

Its name means "Hill or Height" in the Mangue language, which corresponds to the geographical location of its first settlers located in the vicinity of the Laguna de Apoyo.

== Demographics ==
Diriá has a current population of 7,261 inhabitants. Of the total population, 51% are men and 49% are women. Almost 62% of the population lives in urban areas.

== Nature and climate ==
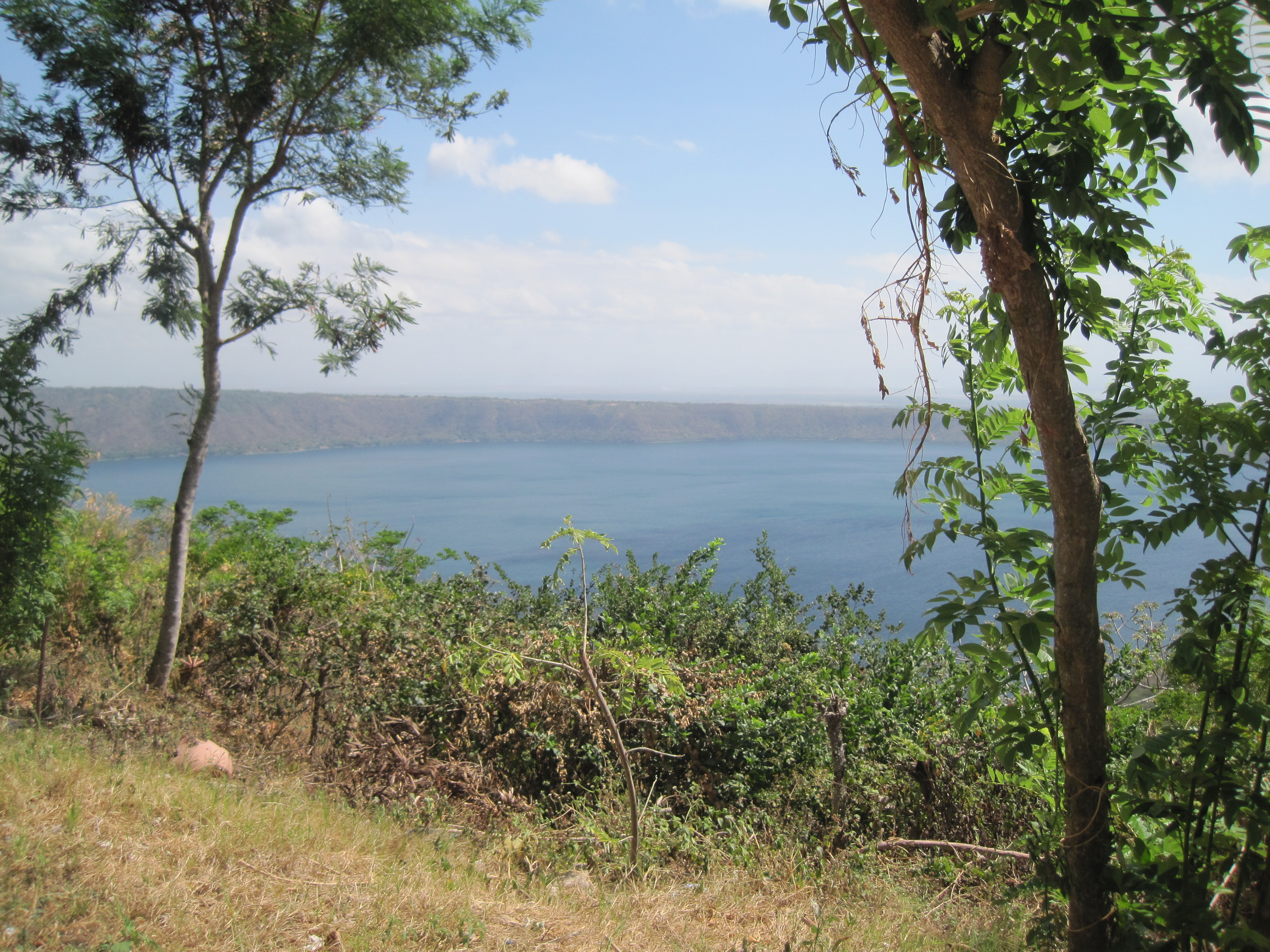
Support Lagoon from the Diriá Viewpoint

Diriá is located on the south side of the Laguna de Apoyo, of which there is a beautiful view from the Diriá Viewpoint. From there, a narrow and winding path goes down to the beach. The municipality has a tropical savanna climate, with rainfall that ranges between 1200 and 1400 mm, characterized by a good distribution throughout the year, its temperature average reaches 27°C, which defines climate as semi-humid.
