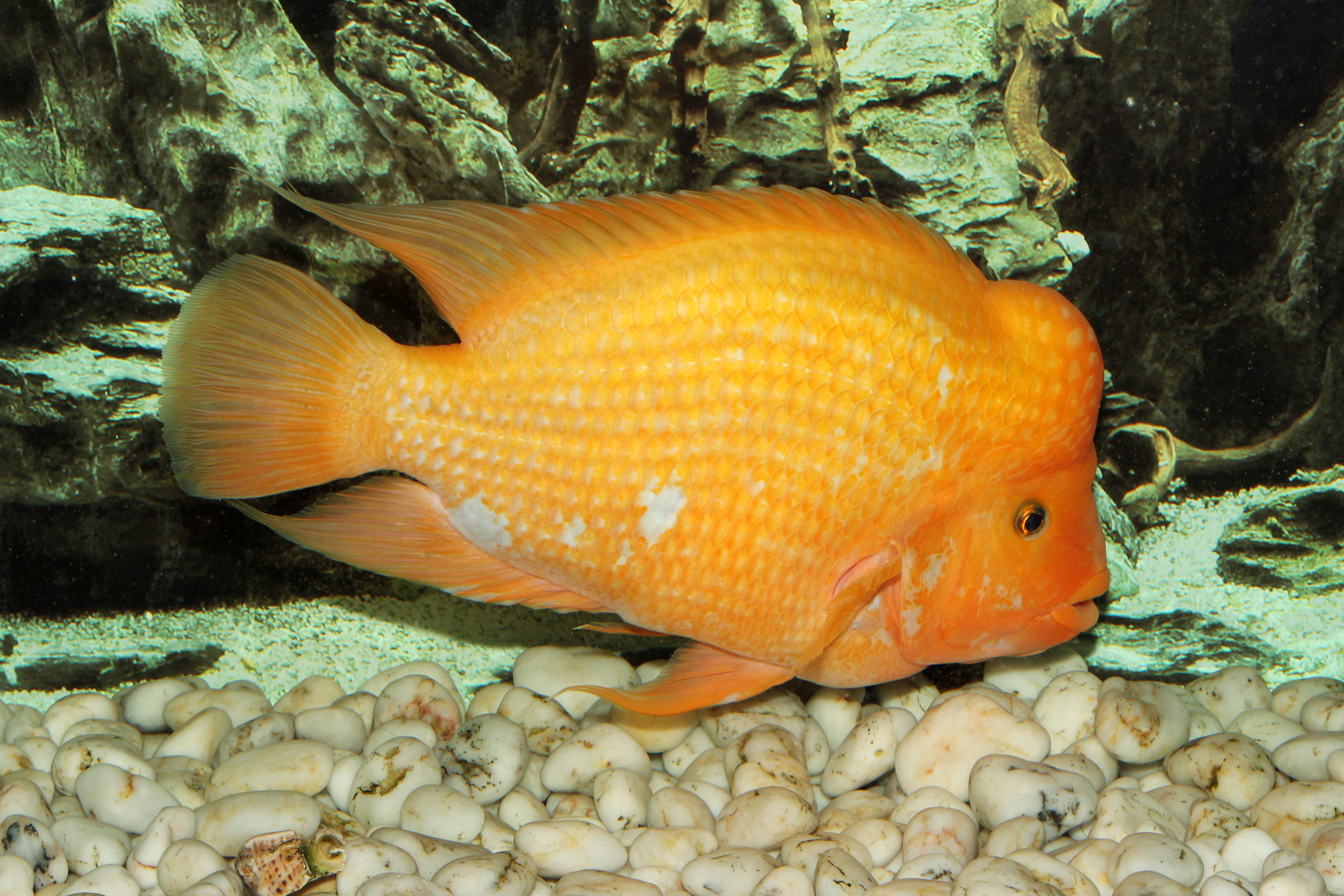

Conservation status
- Least Concern (IUCN 3.1)

Scientific classification
- Kingdom: Animalia
- Phylum: Chordata
- Class: Actinopterygii
- Division: Teleostei
- Order: Cichliformes
- Family: Cichlidae
- Genus: Amphilophus
- Species: A. citrinellus

Binomial name
- Amphilophus citrinellus (Günther, 1864)

Synonyms
- Cichlasoma citrinella (Gïnther, 1864); Heros citrinellus Günther, 1864; Amphilophus citrinellum (Günther, 1864); Archocentrus citrinellus (Günther, 1864); Cichlasoma citrinellum (Günther, 1864); Herichthys citrinellus (Günther, 1864); Heros basilaris T.N. Gill, 1877; Cichlasoma granadense Meek, 1907

= Amphilophus citrinellus =

Species of fish

Amphilophus citrinellus is a large cichlid fish endemic to the San Juan River and adjacent watersheds in Costa Rica and Nicaragua. In the aquarium trade A. citrinellus is often sold under the trade name of Midas cichlid. A. citrinellus are omnivorous and their diet consists of plant material, molluscs and smaller fish. The species is closely related to, but not to be mistaken for, Amphilophus labiatus, which shares the nickname red devil cichlid.

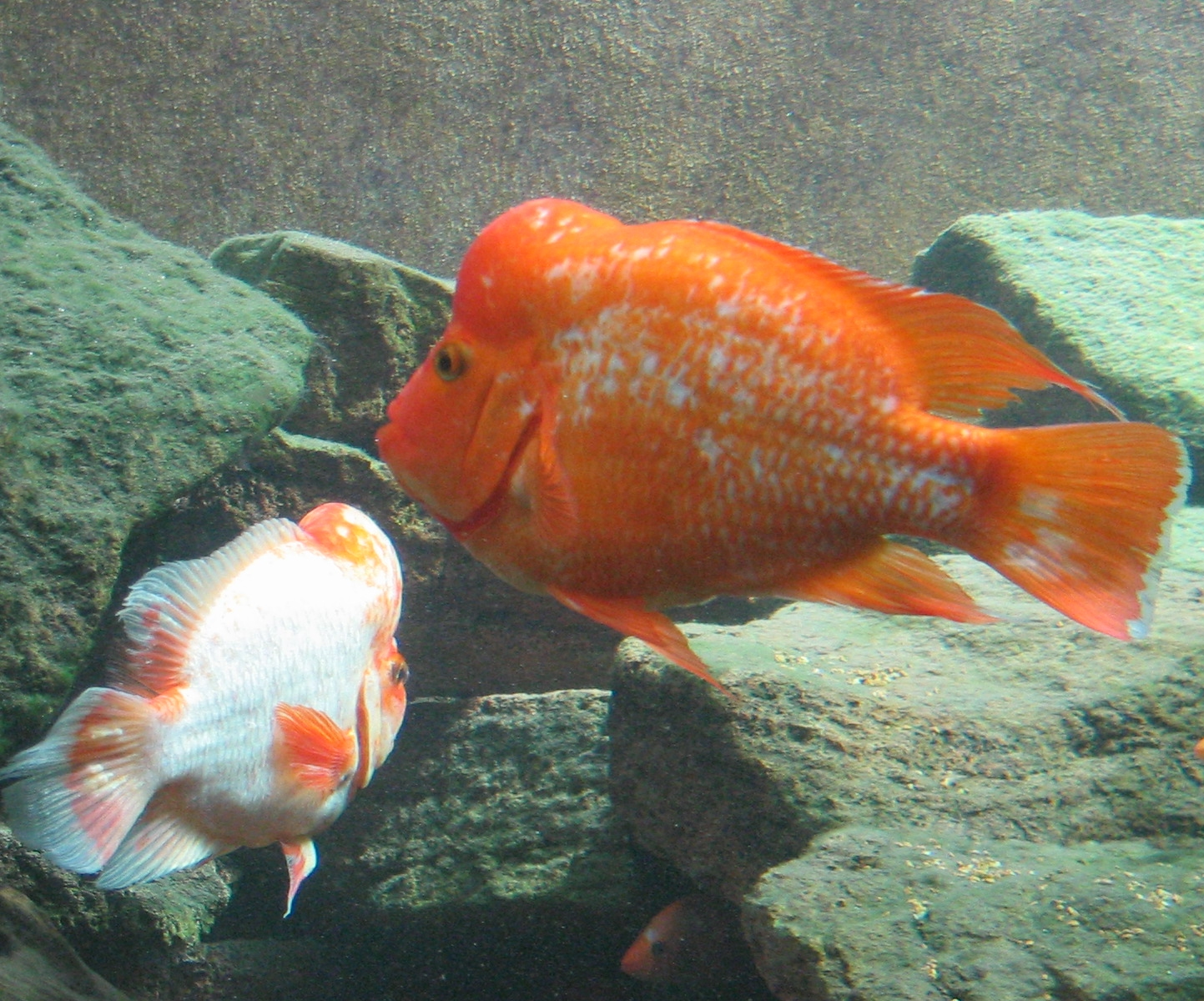
Two Midas cichlids

== Physical characteristics ==
Midas cichlids are heavily built and are capable of standing up to any other aquarium-sized cichlid in fights over territory. They have powerful jaws, sharp teeth and a physical size advantage in comparison to other aquarium species. Therefore, the aggressivity of Midas cichlids should not be underestimated and cohabitants should be chosen carefully in an aquarium setting.

== Taxonomic status ==
Considerable debate over the taxonomic status of A. citrinellus began soon after the discovery of this species in the nineteenth century and continued throughout the twentieth century. A multivariate approach to treatment of anatomical characters has facilitated the discrimination among very similarly shaped species, aided by behavioral and ecological evidence. Multiple species of this group have been identified and verified by genomic and mitochondrial DNA evidence in volcanic crater lakes Apoyo and Xiloá. The genetic evidence from Apoyo supports a hypothesis that the six known species of the lake evolved via sympatric speciation. A few to perhaps several dozen species fitting the biological species concept are considered to exist among what has historically been called A. citrinellus, the great majority of which have not been described to date. The nine most recently described members of this species complex are considered endemic to their respective small, volcanic crater lakes.

Colouration in wild stocks is variable, with most specimens grey to olive brown with a characteristic pattern of black dorsolateral bars, some pink, white, yellow or orange specimens do occur. These brightly colored forms, often called "golds", exist in nature at varying frequencies throughout the range of the species group. Colorations and morphological characters (e.g. accentuated nuchal humps) seen in the hobbyist trade are the product of selective breeding for several generations and may not be reflected in the wild.

== Conservation status ==
Amphilophus citrinellus has been evaluated as being of least concern for extinction by the International Union for Conservation of Nature. The arrow cichlid (Amphilophus zaliosus) was evaluated as Critically Endangered by the IUCN Red List. Among the small body of information regarding populations of the remaining species of this group, four other species may have smaller populations and/or ranges than this fish in Laguna de Apoyo: Amphilophus flaveolus, Amphilophus chancho, Amphilophus supercilius, and Amphilophus globosus. The final member of the complex, Amphilophus astorquii, constitutes about eighty percent of the breeding population of Laguna de Apoyo.

== See also ==
- Flowerhorn cichlid
- List of freshwater aquarium fish species
