= Miss Grand Nicaragua 2023 =

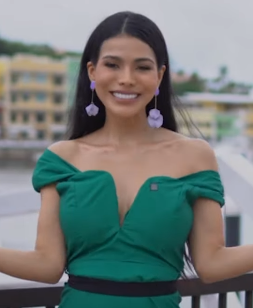
- Glennys Medina, the winner of the contest
- Date: 24 May 2023
- Presenters: Epifanía Solís; Maycrin Jáenz
- Venue: Holiday Inn Managua Convention Center, Managua
- Broadcaster: YouTube, Facebook Live
- Entrants: 12
- Placements: 7
- Debuts: Carazo; Chinandega; Chontales; Madriz; Masaya; Rivas
- Withdrawals: Boaco; North Caribbean Coast; Río San Juan
- Winner: Glennys Medina (Rivas)

Miss Grand Nicaragua 2023 was the second edition of the Miss Grand Nicaragua beauty pageant, held at Holiday Inn Managua Convention Center in Managua, Nicaragua, on 24 May 2023. Twelve candidates had qualified for the national pageant via an audition competed for the title, of whom 28-year-old diplomacy and international relations graduate Glennys Medina, representing Rivas Department, was announced the winner.

Medina later represented Nicaragua at the international competition, Miss Grand International 2023, in Vietnam on 25 October, but was unplaced.

The event was hosted by two former Miss Grand Nicaragua, Epifanía Solís and Maycrin Jáenz, and was transmitted live to audiences worldwide via the organizer's Facebook page and YouTube channel.

== Result ==
Position	Delegate
Miss Grand Nicaragua 2023	Rivas – Glennys Medina
1st runner-up	Managua – Gabriela Saballos
2nd runner-up	Madriz – Yolaina Guillen
3rd runner-up	Masaya – Lisseth Palacios
4th runner-up	RACCS – Keytel Price
5th runner-up	León – Esther Ruiz
6th runner-up	Carazo – Mayerlin Sanchez

== Candidates ==
12 contestants competed for the title.

Department	Candidate
Carazo	Mayerlin Sanchez
Chinandega	Keytling Salazar
Chontales	Angelica Roman
Corn Islands (RACCS)	Oneysi Campbell
Granada	Daniela Rodriguez
León	Esther Ruiz
Madriz	Yolaina Guillen
Managua	Daniela Serpa
Managua City	Gabriela Saballos
Masaya	Lisseth Cardenas
Rivas	Glennys Medina
South Caribbean Coast	Keytel Price

Competition result by department
Color key:
Winner	1st RU	2nd RU
3rd RU	4th RU	5th RU
6th RU	Unplaced	Not competed
