= Miss Grand Nicaragua 2021 =

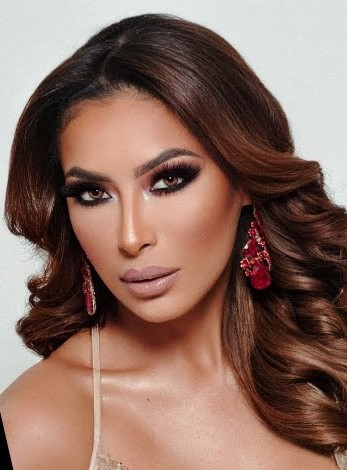
- Maycrin Jáenz, one of the contest's winners
- Date: 8 August 2021
- Venue: Teatro Municipal José de la Cruz Mena, León
- Broadcaster: YouTube, Facebook Live
- Entrants: 9
- Placements: 5
- Debuts: Boaco; Granada; León; Managua; North Caribbean Coast; Río San Juan; South Caribbean Coast
- Winner: Epifanía Solís (Managua); Maycrin Jáenz (Granada)

External videos
- Miss Grand Nicaragua 2021 Grand gala final, on 11 August 2021, YouTube video

Miss Grand Nicaragua 2021 was the inaugural edition of the Miss Grand Nicaragua beauty pageant, held at the Teatro Municipal José de la Cruz Mena in León, Nicaragua, on August 8, 2021. Nine candidates from seven of the country's departments competed for the national titles, with Managua and the North Caribbean Coast each sending two candidates. Epifanía Solís of Managua and Maycrin Jáenz of Granada were named Miss Grand Nicaragua 2021 and Miss Grand Nicaragua 2022, respectively. The contest was organized under the direction of Saul Benítez, a León-based designer who acquired the contest license in 2019.

After the end of the pageant training, Epifanía Solís represented the country at the Miss Grand International 2021 pageant held on December 4, 2021, in Thailand, while Maycrin Jáenz later participated in the following edition held on October 25, 2022, in Indonesia. Both of them went unplaced.

In the 2021 international tournament, Epifanía Solís was ranked among the top ten in the Best in Swimsuit category, one of the pageant's sub-contests.

== Competition ==
In the grand final competition held on August 8, the results of all preliminary activities determined the 5 semifinalists.

The following was the panel of judges for the grand final competition of the Miss Grand Nicaragua 2021 pageant.

- Nairoby Ramírez
- Arlen Mairena
- Karina Gaitán
- Gabriel Rodríguez

Miss Grand Nicaragua 2021 selection process

Initial pool (9 candidates)	Finals (Top 5)	Winners announcement
Swimsuit round	Granada
Managua (1)	Managua (1)
Evening gown round	RACCN (2)	Speech round	- - - - - - - - - - - - -
RACCS	Granada
Río San Juan

== Results summary ==
=== Main placements ===
Miss Grand Nicaragua 2021 competition result by department
Color keys

Winner
Runners-up

Unplaced
Did not compete

Miss Grand Nicaragua 2021 competition result
Position	Delegate
Miss Grand Nicaragua 2021	Managua (1) – Epifanía Solís
Miss Grand Nicaragua 2022	Granada – Maycrin Jáenz
1st runner-up	North Caribbean Coast (2) – Magdalena Jarquín
2nd runner-up	South Caribbean Coast – Krizzia Chang
3rd runner-up	Río San Juan – Mayela Chamorro

=== Special awards ===
List of Miss Grand Nicaragua 2021 special award winners
Award	Winner
Miss Virtual	Río San Juan – Mayela Chamorro
Miss Elegance	Managua (1) – Epifanía Solís
Best Face	León – Cristina Pérez
Best Skin	Managua (2) – Hellen Morales
Best Hair	Río San Juan – Mayela Chamorro
Best Body	North Caribbean Coast (2) – Magdalena Jarquín
Best Model	South Caribbean Coast – Krizzia Chang

== Candidates ==
9 contestants competed for the titles.

Department	Candidate
Boaco	Sherly Corea
Granada	Maycrin Jáenz
León	Cristina Pérez
Managua (1)	Epifanía Solís
Managua (2)	Hellen Morales
North Caribbean Coast (1)	Katy Muller
North Caribbean Coast (2)	Magdalena Jarquín
Río San Juan	Mayela Chamorro
South Caribbean Coast	Krizzia Chang
