= Dolores, Nicaragua =

Dolores
- Municipality
- Location in Nicaragua
- Coordinates: 11°51′N 86°13′W
- Country: Nicaragua
- Department: Carazo Department

Area
  - Land: 1.2 sq mi (3 km^{2})

Population (2005)
  - Municipality: 6,761
  - Urban: 6,535

Dolores is a municipality in the Carazo department of Nicaragua. It is the smallest municipality in Nicaragua, as it consists only of the urban area or dwellings of its head town.

== Geography ==
The municipal term borders to the north and west with the municipality of Diriamba and to the south and east with the municipality of Jinotepe. The municipal head town is located 44 kilometers from the capital, Managua, and just 1 kilometer from the city of Jinotepe.

It has a regularly flat topography and includes rivers that are part of the Rio Grande de Carazo basin.

== History ==
There are two theories about the origin of the municipality's name; some historians claim that between the years 1890 to 1895, the image of the Most Holy Virgin of Sorrows was found at the site and was carried in a procession to the parish church of Jinotepe, the place of its definitive seat. Another version maintains that the name is due to one of the first founding families of the municipality, in which there was a lady named Dolores, which is why the name that the municipality now bears was chosen.

Dolores was elevated to the status of Town by Legislative Law on October 14, 1904.

== Demography ==
Dolores has a current population of 8,916 inhabitants. Of the total population, 46.8% are men and 53.2% are women. Nearly 88% of the population lives in the urban area.

== Nature and Climate ==
The municipality has a tropical savannah climate (semi-humid). It has precipitation that varies between 1200 and 1400 mm characterized by a good distribution of rain throughout the year. The temperature fluctuates between 22 and 23 °C throughout the year.

== Localities ==
In the urban core, there are eleven neighborhoods: Sandino, Cristo Rey, Guadalupe, Alfonso Pascual, Central Zone, Los Ramos, May 3rd, San Antonio, Santa Ana, San Pablo, Heroes and Martyrs. While in the rural area, there are six districts: El Panamá, El Paso Real, El Guachipilín, El Limón, July 19th, Sandineña.

== Economy ==
The economic activity of the municipality is predominantly agricultural, characterized by a variety of basic grains: rice, beans, and vegetables, the municipality has a total of 400 manzanas planted.

== Culture ==
The festivities take place from May 1st to 10th, on May 3rd processions are held through all the streets of the city, parade of floats, with the queens of the festivities. During the festivities, different foods and drinks typical to the customs and traditions of the municipality of Dolores are highlighted.

== See also ==
- Municipalities of Nicaragua
