= Diriomo =

- Municipality
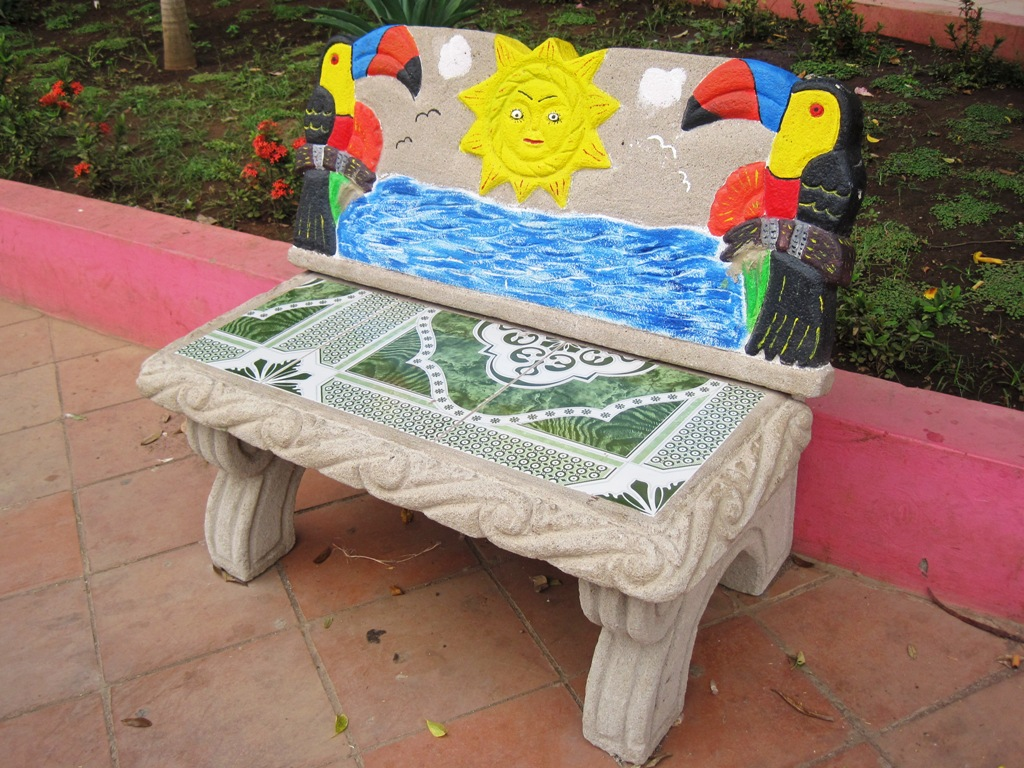
- Nickname: Pueblo de Brujos Pueblos Blancos ("Witches' Village; White Towns")
- Location in Nicaragua
- Coordinates: 11°52′N 86°03′W
- Country: Nicaragua
- Department: Granada

Area
  - Municipality: 19.3 sq mi (50.1 km^{2})

Population (2022 estimate)
  - Municipality: 34,381
  - Density: 1,780/sq mi (686/km^{2})
  - Urban: 16,946
- Time zone: Central Standard Time
- Climate: Aw

Diriomo is a town and a municipality in the Granada department of Nicaragua.

Diriomo is located on a plateau near the Mombacho Volcano, between Masatepe and Granada, 48 kilometers from the capital, Managua.The population of Diriomo Municipality is approximately 34,000.

== History ==
The name of Diriomo comes from the native language of Nahuatlaca, meaning foreign. Before the arrival of the Spaniards, the town belonged to a tribe belonging to the Chorotegas, which also belonged to the neighboring areas of Diriangén, Nicarao and Diriá.

Diriomo is also considered part of the White Towns, or Pueblos Blancos, along with Nindiri, San Juan de Oriente, San Marcos, Niquinohomo, Masatepe, Catarina, and Diria. These towns take this name due to the whitewash on their houses and buildings, made from water, salt and lime. The White Towns are known to represent strong Nicaraguan pre-Columbian traditions, dating to before the arrival of the European colonizers.

== Places of interest ==
- Laguna de Apoyo
- La Casa de las Cajetas
- La Granadilla Community

The Granadilla is a group of local farmers who allow tourists to view how they live in their rural settings. This destination offers tourists the chance to rent horses and bikes, go on oxcart tours, and offers lodging.

== Festivals and events ==
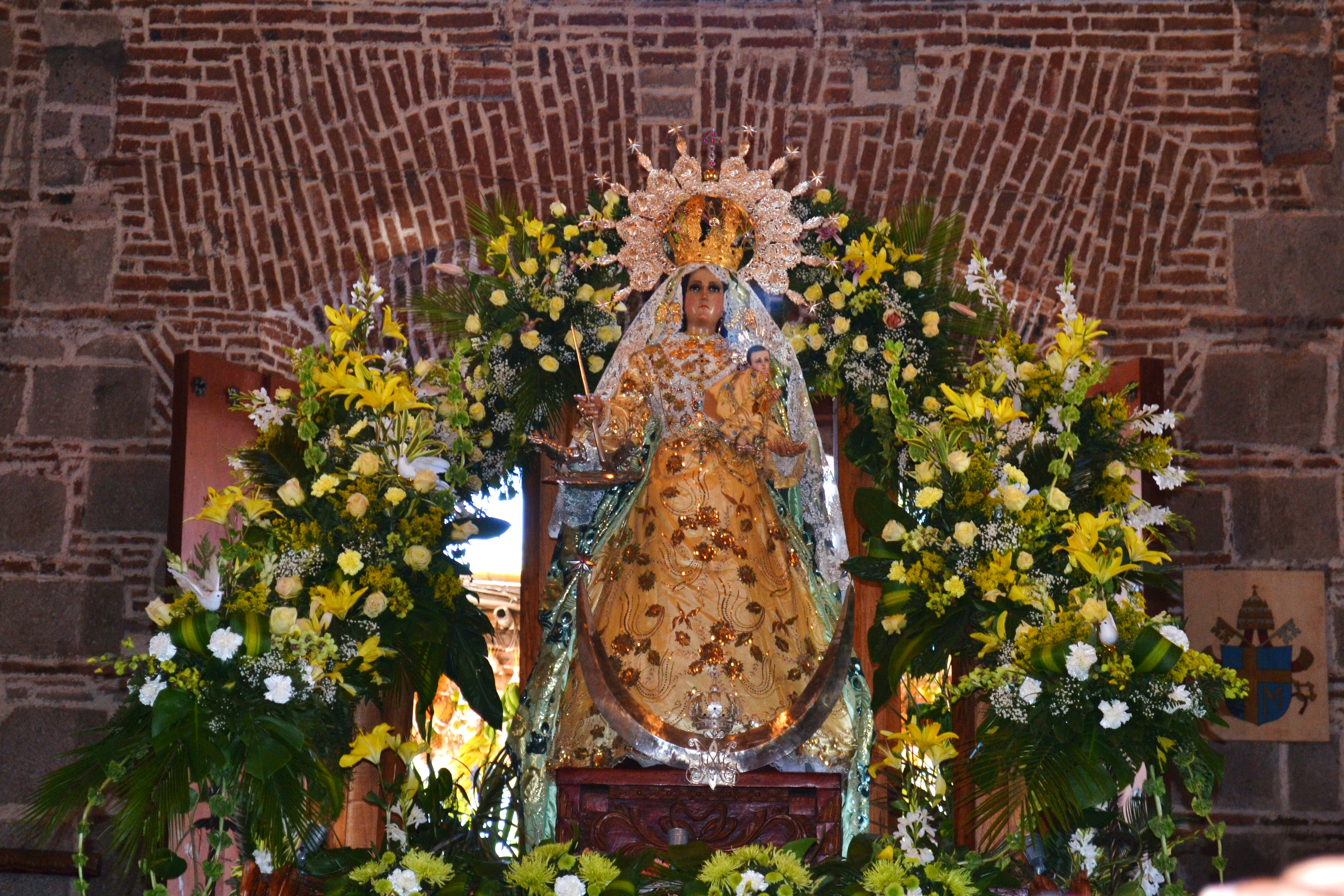
The Virgen de Candelaria in the February 2nd celebrations in Diriomo

Diriomo celebrates the patron festivities from January 21- February 9, with February 2nd as the main day, every year in honor of the Virgen de Candelaria. The Virgin de Candelaria holds a candle in her right hand and baby Jesus on the other. The image of the Virgen is taken to La Raya, the place where it is believed she made one of her biggest miracle of saving the town from death during the volcanic eruption of the Cosigüina in 1835. During the mass on February 2 there is a tradition to bless the candles people bring, which are a representation of the light of Christ.

During this time the pacific environment turns into a busy time with thousands of people coming from all over the country, nearby municipalities and as a tourist destination. People attending can enjoy the traditional drink known as chicha bruja, an alcoholic corn drink. Other traditional foods for the occasion include rosquillas, a corn masa cookie, and cajetas, a local fruit based sweet. During the celebration there are traditional dances offered to the Virgen, including Las Inditas, Los Diablitos y la Sirena.
