= Amphilophus chancho =

Scientific classification
- Kingdom: Animalia
- Phylum: Chordata
- Class: Actinopterygii
- Division: Teleostei
- Order: Cichliformes
- Family: Cichlidae
- Genus: Amphilophus
- Species: A. chancho

Binomial name
- Amphilophus chancho Stauffer, McCrary & Black, 2008

Species of fish

Amphilophus chancho is a large cichlid fish endemic to Lake Apoyo in Nicaragua.

The six Amphilophus species found in Lake Apoyo show morphological differences.

Multiple species of this group have been identified and verified by genomic and mitochondrial DNA evidence in the volcanic crater lake Apoyo and another Nicaraguan crater lake, Xiloá. The genetic evidence from Apoyo supports a hypothesis that the six known species of the lake evolved via sympatric speciation. A few to perhaps several dozen species fitting the biological species concept are considered to exist among what has historically been called A. citrinellus, the great majority of which have not been described to date. The nine most recently described members of this species complex are considered endemic to their respective small, volcanic crater lakes.
