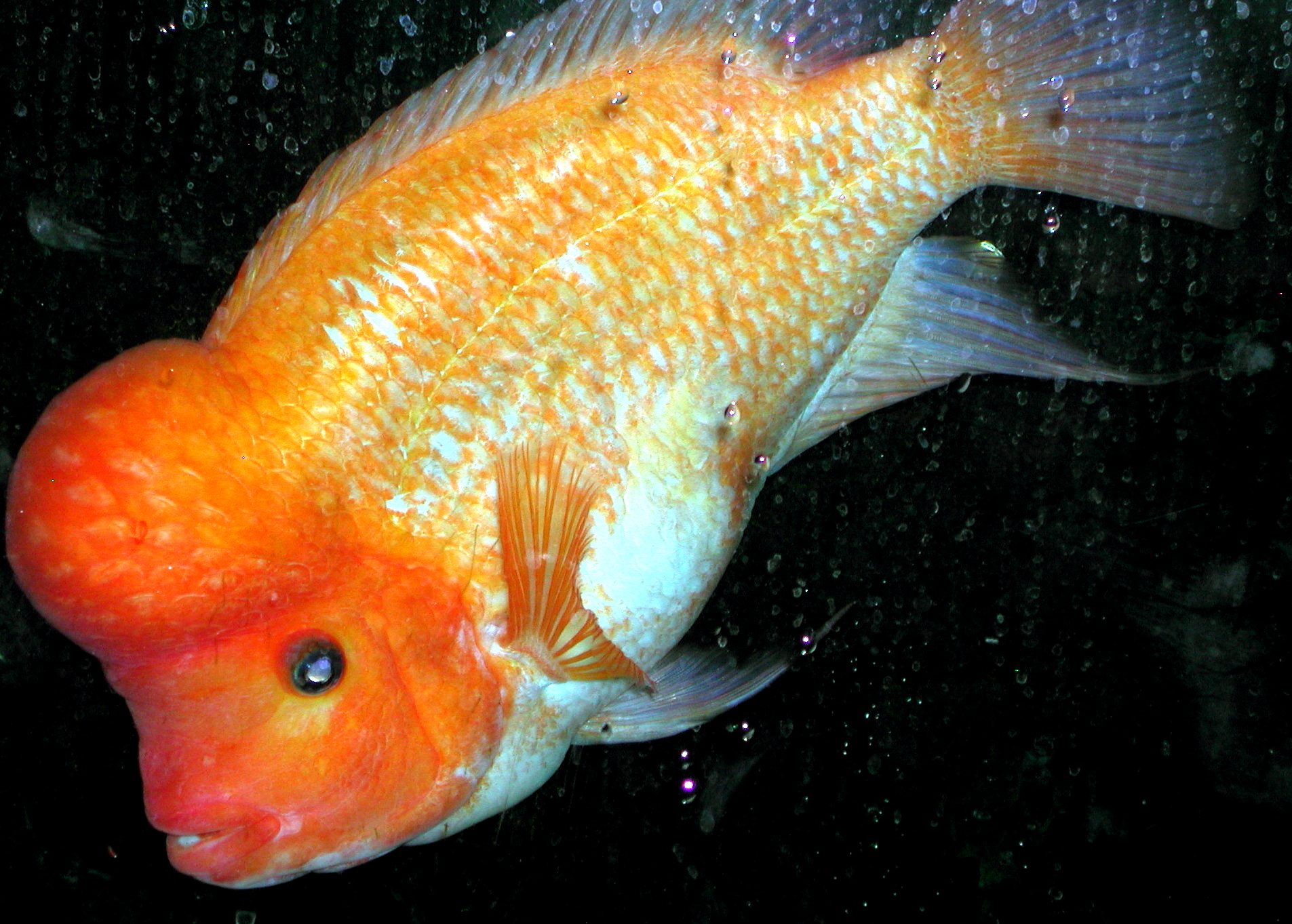
- Midas cichlid (A. citrinellus)

Scientific classification
- Kingdom: Animalia
- Phylum: Chordata
- Class: Actinopterygii
- Order: Cichliformes
- Family: Cichlidae
- Tribe: Heroini
- Genus: Amphilophus; Agassiz, 1859

Type species
- Amphilophus froebelii Agassiz, 1859

Synonyms
- Curraichthys Fernández-Yépez, 1969; Erythrichthus Meek, 1907

= Amphilophus =

Genus of fishes

Amphilophus is a genus of cichlid fishes from Central America, ranging from southern Mexico to Panama. The genus currently contains 23 species, including several that are well known from the aquarium trade. However, studies led by Oldřich Říčan in 2008 and 2016 suggested that several species within Amphilophus should be moved to the genus Astatheros. Species proposed to be moved to Astatheros in 2008 were A. alfari, A. altifrons, A. bussingi, A. diquis, A. longimanus, A. macracanthus (which would be the type species for Astatheros), A. margaritifer, A. rhytisma, A. robertsoni and A. rostratus. Further genetic studies led Říčan to put A. macracanthus in Astatheros, but to put A. alfari, A. altifrons, A. bussingi, A. diquis, A. longimanus, A. rhytisma, A. robertsoni and A. rostratus within the genus Cribroheros. Říčan's study suggests that the Astatheros species are more closely related to the Jack Dempsey and rainbow cichlid than to the remaining Amphilophus species.

Several species from this genus are endemic to the small Lake Apoyo (6 species) and Lake Xiloá (4 species) in Nicaragua, and are believed to be the result of sympatric speciation.

== Species ==
According to FishBase, there are currently 16 recognized species in this genus, listed below. According to Catalog of Fishes, Amphilophus erythraeus is a valid species (considered a synonym of A. labiatus by FishBase), Amphilophus margaritifer is an invalid species, and Amphilophus includes two additional species, Amphilophus istlanus and Amphilophus trimaculatus (both these are placed in Cichlasoma by FishBase). Whereas trimaculatus belongs in Amphilophus based on genetics, appearance and behavior, the position of istlanus is less clear, as nDNA places it in Amphilophus, but mDNA places it in Mayaheros; istlanus is likely the result of hybrid speciation involving A. trimaculatus and Mayaheros beani.

- Amphilophus amarillo Stauffer & McKaye, 2002
- Amphilophus astorquii Stauffer, McCrary & K. E. Black, 2008 (Black midas cichlid)
- Amphilophus chancho Stauffer, McCrary & K. E. Black, 2008
- Amphilophus citrinellus (Günther, 1864) (Midas cichlid)
- Amphilophus flaveolus Stauffer, McCrary & K. E. Black, 2008
- Amphilophus globosus Geiger, McCrary & Stauffer, 2010
- Amphilophus hogaboomorum (Carr & Giovannoli, 1950)
- Amphilophus istlanus (Jordan & Snyder, 1899)
- Amphilophus labiatus (Günther, 1864) (Red devil)
- Amphilophus lyonsi (J. P. Gosse, 1966)
- Amphilophus margaritifer (Günther, 1862)
- Amphilophus sagittae Stauffer & McKaye, 2002
- Amphilophus supercilius Geiger, McCrary & Stauffer, 2010
- Amphilophus tolteca Recknagel, Kusche, Elmer & A. Meyer, 2013
- Amphilophus trimaculatus (Günther, 1867) (Three spot cichlid)
- Amphilophus viridis Recknagel, Kusche, Elmer & A. Meyer, 2013
- Amphilophus xiloaensis Stauffer & McKaye, 2002
- Amphilophus zaliosus (Barlow, 1976) (Arrow cichlid)
