= Guapote =

Guapote is a vernacular name for several species of cichlid fish, including members of the genera:

- Parachromis
- Mayaheros
