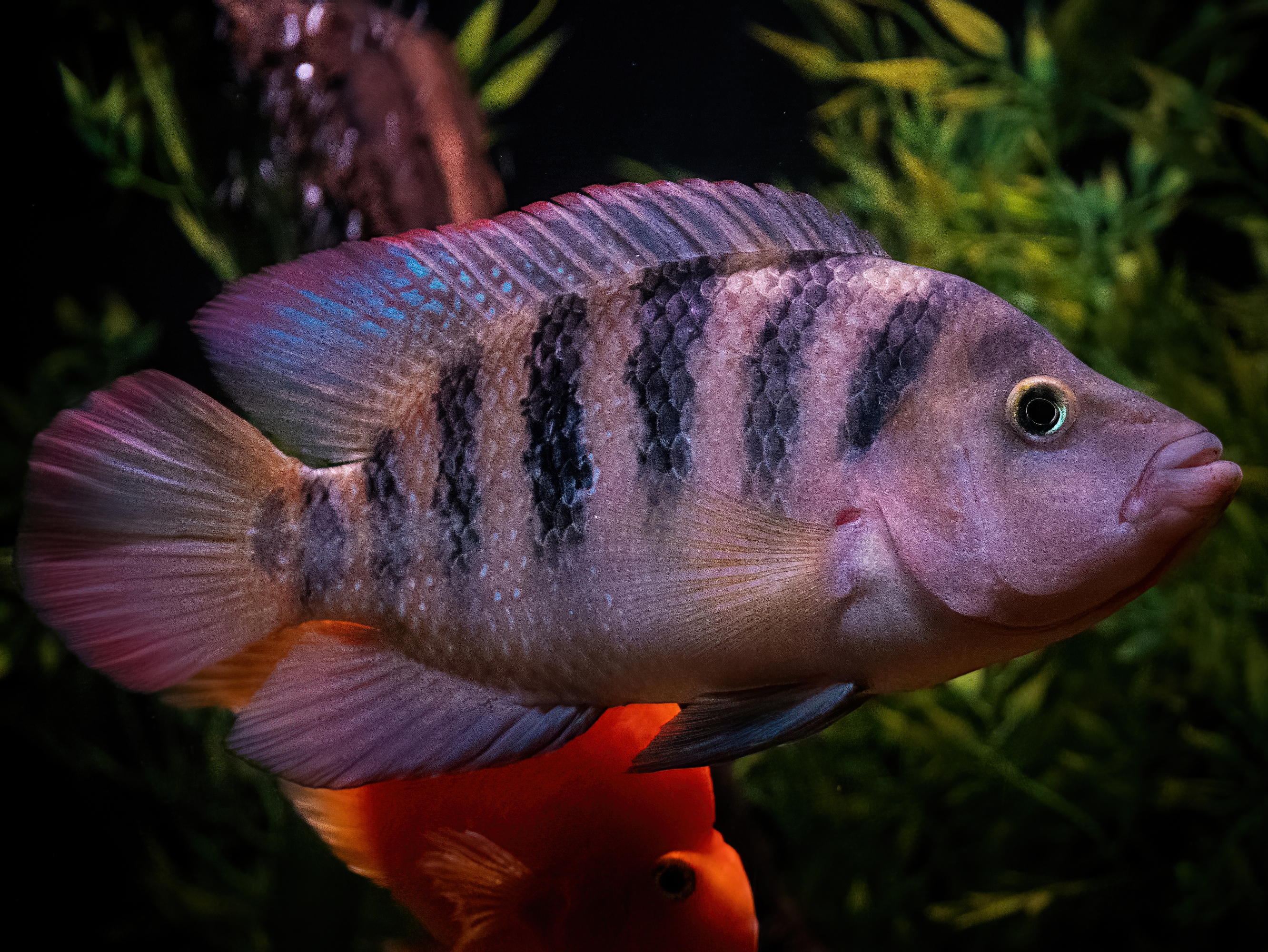
- Mayaheros urophthalmus

Scientific classification
- Kingdom: Animalia
- Phylum: Chordata
- Class: Actinopterygii
- Order: Cichliformes
- Family: Cichlidae
- Tribe: Heroini
- Genus: Mayaheros; Říčan & Piálek, 2016

Type species
- Heros urophthalmus Günther, 1862

= Mayaheros =

Genus of fishes

Mayaheros is a genus of cichlid fish that is native to Mexico and northern Central America. This genus has a disjunct distribution, with the M. urophthalmus group being found in the Atlantic drainages of southeastern Mexico (southern Veracruz east to the Yucatán Peninsula and southwards), Belize, eastern Guatemala, northern Honduras, and northeastern Nicaragua, while M. beani is the northernmost cichlid in the Pacific drainage, ranging from Jalisco to Sonora in northwestern Mexico. Both inhabit a wide range of habitats, such as freshwater rivers, streams, lakes, ponds, pools and marshes, as well as brackish waters including estuaries, lagoons, and mangroves, with members of the M. urophthalmus group sometimes even occurring in caves or coastal marine waters. They are medium-sized to large cichlids that are omnivorous, feeding mostly on small animals, but also plants and detritus.

Mayaheros cichlids are sometimes kept in aquaria and commonly caught for food. Broadstock of the M. urophthalmus group that is better suited for farming is being developed by Mexican authorities; M. beani also has potential in farming, but preliminary tests have been complicated by its high levels of aggression. Both M. beani and M. urophthalmus are overall common and regarded as least concern by the IUCN, although certain local populations are under pressure from habitat loss, pollution, overfishing and introduced species. A captive breeding program exists for a few populations of M. beani. If many species are recognized within the M. urophthalmus group (see #Species), most are restricted to a single location in the Yucatán Peninsula region, such as a lagoon, cenote, cave, island, or bay, and some are seriously threatened. The most threatened –if not already extinct– are likely M. conchitae of the Conchita Cenote and M. ericymba of the Sambulá Cave (M. ericymba has enlarged eyes and sensory pores, likely an adaption to its low-light habitat), which both are located at the city of Mérida. The Conchita Cenote appears to have disappeared entirely, and while the Sambulá Cave still exists, M. ericymba has not been seen since the 1930s. If recognized as valid species or subspecies of M. urophthalmus, these two are the only likely extinct cichlids of the Americas. Conversely, M. urophthalmus has been introduced outside its native range in Oaxaca (Mexico), Florida (United States), the Philippines, Thailand and Singapore. It is unclear which member of the M. urophthalmus group is involved in these introductions, except in Florida where the population was based on individuals from several different locations in the M. urophthalmus group's native range.

== Taxonomy ==
Both the species M. beani and M. urophthalmus were first scientifically described as members of the genus Heros and then moved to Cichlasoma despite clearly belonging elsewhere. Mayaheros was only established for them in 2016.

=== Species ===
Traditionally, only two species have been recognized in this group: the northwest Mexican M. beani, and the southeast Mexican and northern Central American M. urophthalmus. The latter had a large number of subspecies that had been described in 1935–38 by Carl Leavitt Hubbs based on exact colour patterns (notably of their body stripes and tail base spots) and morphometrics. In a taxonomic review of 2003, those that had been described in 1936–38 by Hubbs and M. troschelii described in 1867 by Franz Steindachner were preliminarily elevated to species status, thus increasing the number of recognized species in the urophthalmus group to 11. A 2005 thesis proposed that all those, M. trispilus described in 1935 by Hubbs, and eight additional currently undescribed species (names were proposed, but the thesis does not comply with article 8 of the ICZN Code) should be recognized in the urophthalmus group based on colour patterns and morphometrics. This would effectively limit "true" M. urophthalmus to the Lake Petén system in Guatemala. Other reviews of many of the populations in the urophthalmus group found that genetic differences are very small without clear geographic structure, that there likely has been widespread translocations of the cichlids by humans in the pre-Columbian era, and that a large amount of individual variations in pattern and morphometrics exists, mostly depending on environmental factors. This points to a single variable species with a high degree of phenotypic plasticity rather than several different species in the urophthalmus group. As a consequence, all proposed species that were directly checked in those studies have been synonymized with M. urophthalmus by Catalog of Fishes, leaving only the unchecked M. aguadae, M. amarus, M. ericymba and M. trispilus as still recognized in this group. In the IUCN's evaluation of 2019, M. urophthalmus had been returned to its original single-species form without other recognized species in the group. In contrast to the complicated taxonomic status of M. urophthalmus, the single-species taxonomy of M. beani is agreed upon by all major authorities.

Unlike Catalog of Fishes and the IUCN, FishBase continues to recognize 13 species in this genus, including M. urophthalmus itself and 11 others in its group (indented in list):

- Mayaheros beani (D. S. Jordan, 1889) (Green guapote)
- Mayaheros urophthalmus (Günther, 1862) (Mayan cichlid)
  - Mayaheros aguadae (C. L. Hubbs, 1936)
  - Mayaheros alborus (C. L. Hubbs, 1936)
  - Mayaheros amarus (C. L. Hubbs, 1936)
  - Mayaheros cienagae (C. L. Hubbs, 1936)
  - Mayaheros conchitae (C. L. Hubbs, 1936)
  - Mayaheros ericymba (C. L. Hubbs, 1938)
  - Mayaheros mayorum (C. L. Hubbs, 1936)
  - Mayaheros stenozonus (C. L. Hubbs, 1936)
  - Mayaheros trispilus (C. L. Hubbs, 1935)
  - Mayaheros troschelii (Steindachner, 1867)
  - Mayaheros zebra (C. L. Hubbs, 1936)

The species Amphilophus istlanus (still included in Cichlasoma by some authorities) is a special case, as nDNA places it in Amphilophus, but mDNA places it in Mayaheros. M. istlanus likely is the result of hybrid speciation involving M. beani and A. trimaculatus.
