= Miss Nicaragua 2017 =

- Date: March 25, 2017
- Presenters: Valeria Sánchez
- Venue: Teatro Nacional Rubén Darío, Managua, Nicaragua
- Broadcaster: VosTV
- Entrants: 16
- Winner: Berenice Quezada; Rama

The Miss Nicaragua 2017 pageant was held on March 25, 2017, in Managua, after several weeks of events. At the conclusion of the final night of the competition, Berenice Quezada from Rama won the title.

== Results ==
=== Placements ===
| Placement | Contestant |
|---|---|
| Miss Nicaragua 2017 | Rama – Berenice Quezada |
| Miss World Nicaragua 2017 | Rivas – Monserrat Allen |
| Miss International Nicaragua 2017 | Matagalpa – Helen Martínez |
| Miss Grand Nicaragua 2017 | Estelí – Martha Soledad Meza |
| Top 7 | Chinandega – Allison Herrera; Corn Islands – Danielle Hodgson; Tipitapa – Katering Medina |

== Special awards ==
- Best Hair - Rama - Berenice Quezada
- Miss Attitude - León - Vanessa Baldizón
- Best Body - Siuna - Magdalene Meza
- Miss Elegance - Matagalpa - Helen Martínez
- Best Smile - Rama - Berenice Quezada
- Miss Photogenic - Estelí - Martha Meza
- Best Look - Tipitapa - Katering Medina

.

== Contestants ==
Sixteen contestants competed for the four titles.

| Department/City | Contestant |
|---|---|
| Achuapa | Teresa Moreno |
| Carazo | Maria Leonela Cerda |
| Chinandega | Allison Herrera |
| Ciudad Darío | Martha Pineda |
| Corn Islands | Danielle Hodgson |
| Estelí | Martha Soledad Meza |
| Jinotega | Anahi Cruz |
| León | Vanessa Baldizón |
| Managua | Raquel Bustos |
| Matagalpa | Helen Martínez |
| Nueva Segovia | Stefany Reyes |
| RACCN | Jeimy Lampson |
| Rama | Berenice Quezada |
| Rivas | Monserrat Allen |
| Siuna | Magdalene Meza |
| Tipitapa | Katering Medina |

== Judges ==
- Brianny Chamorro - 3rd runner-up in Miss International 2016
- Arturo Draper - Professional makeup artist
- Samantha Lugo - CNN journalist
- Daniel Garzon - Nicaraguan goldsmith
- Karen Torres Gutierrez - Regional Manager of GRUPO CERCA
- Bismarck Martinez - Fashion designer
- Linda Clerk - Miss Nicaragua 1995
- Dr. Ivan Mendieta - President of Dental Care S.A.

.

== Background Music ==
- Swimsuit Competition – Clean Bandit & Sean Paul - "Rockabye"

.
