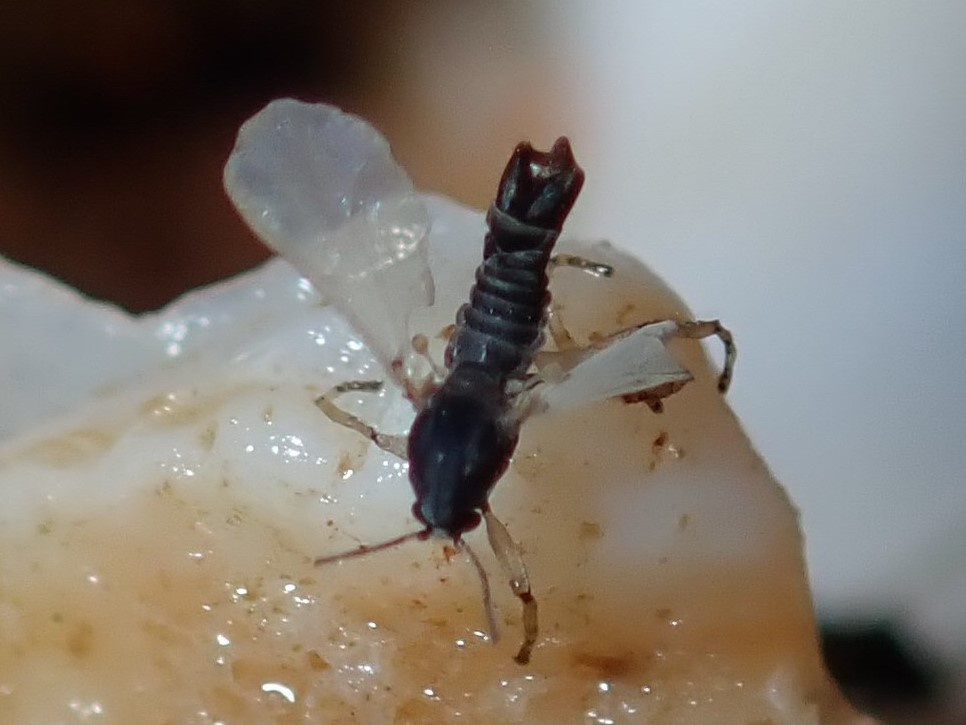
- Clunio pacificus

Scientific classification
- Kingdom: Animalia
- Phylum: Arthropoda
- Clade: Pancrustacea
- Class: Insecta
- Order: Diptera
- Family: Chironomidae
- Subfamily: Orthocladiinae
- Genus: Clunio; Haliday, 1855

= Clunio =

Genus of flies

Clunio is a genus of non-biting midges in the subfamily Orthocladiinae of the bloodworm family (Chironomidae). All species in the genus are marine. They are found in the intertidal zone of many coasts worldwide. The species Clunio marinus is a long-standing model system in chronobiology and its genome has been sequenced. Clunio species can be dispersed widely by hitch-hiking on sea turtles, feeding on algae growing on their carapace.

== Species ==
The following species are recognized by the World Register of Marine Species, with some additional species recognized by the Catalogue of Life (marked with C):

- Clunio adriaticus Schiner, 1856
- Clunio africanus Hesse, 1937
- Clunio aquilonius Tokunaga, 1938
- Clunio balticus Heimbach, 1978
- Clunio boudouresquei Moubayed-Breil, 2019 C
- Clunio brasiliensis Oliviera, 1950
- Clunio brevis Stone & Wirth, 1947
- Clunio californiensis Hashimoto, 1974
- Clunio chilensis Paggi, 1985 C
- Clunio fuscipennis Wirth, 1952
- Clunio gerlachi Saether, 2004 C
- Clunio jonesi Sæther & Andersen, 2011
- Clunio littoralis Stone & Wirth, 1947
- Clunio marinus Haliday, 1855
- Clunio marshalli Stone & Wirth, 1947
- Clunio martini Hashimoto, 1973
- Clunio minor Tokunaga, 1933 C
- Clunio pacificus Edwards, 1926
- Clunio ponticus Michailova, 1980
- Clunio purpureus Hashimoto, 1962
- Clunio schmitti Stone & Wirth, 1947
- Clunio setoensis Tokunaga, 1933
- Clunio takahashii Tokunaga, 1938
- Clunio tsushimensis Tokunaga, 1933
- Clunio tuthilli Tokunaga, 1964
- Clunio vagans _{Stone & Wirth, 1947}
- Clunio vagansmensis Stone & Wirth C
- Clunio virginianus Paggi, 1985 C
