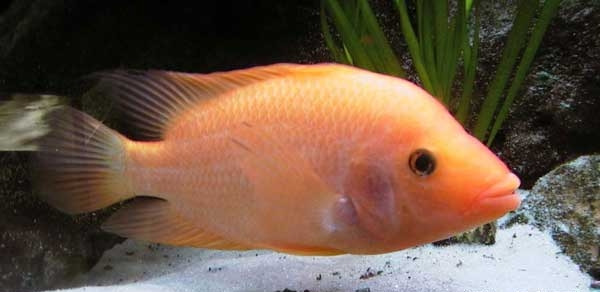

Scientific classification
- Kingdom: Animalia
- Phylum: Chordata
- Class: Actinopterygii
- Order: Cichliformes
- Family: Cichlidae
- Genus: Amphilophus
- Species: A. labiatus

Binomial name
- Amphilophus labiatus (Günther, 1864)

Synonyms
- Heros labiatus Günther, 1864; Cichlasoma labiatum (Günther, 1864); Herichthys labiatus (Günther, 1864); Amphilophus froebelii Agassiz, 1859; Heros erythraeus Günther, 1867; Heros lobochilus Günther, 1867; Cichlasoma dorsatum Meek, 1907

= Amphilophus labiatus =

Species of fish

Amphilophus labiatus is a large cichlid fish endemic to Lake Managua and Lake Nicaragua in Central America. It is also known by the common name red devil cichlid, which it shares with another closely related cichlid, A. citrinellus.

== Description ==
Colouration in wild specimens is variable and while most specimens are grey to greyish green some pink, red or white specimens do occur. Black pigmentation in spots or bands is also common. Some specimens have enlarged lips, though this condition is thought to be related to specific food choice preferences in their natural habitat as this trait disappears in captivity. Like most cichlids, A. labiatus has advanced brood care. The species form monogamous pairs which spawn on flattened rocks or logs.

== Aquarium ==
In the aquarium trade A. labiatus is often sold under the trade name of red devil, a common name which they share with Amphilophus citrinellus, which is more correctly known as the Midas Cichlid owing to its yellow coloration. This occasionally causes confusion between customers and companies that sell both A. labiatus and Amphilophus citrinellus.

=== Behavior ===
Aquarists who keep cichlids regard red devils as aggressive fish. This aggressive behavior combined with their razor sharp teeth and powerful jaws means cohabitants should be chosen carefully and the fish should be kept in a large aquarium. Red devils may be so aggressive that they ram into the glass to get at invaders, break heaters and other aquarium equipment, and will sometimes bite their owners.

== Invasive species ==
In Indonesia, this species was introduced as ornamental aquarium fish. This fish became a big problem in Lake Toba, threatening other species there. However, it was released to the wild and has become an invasive species, especially in the lakes of Java, Sulawesi and Papua.
