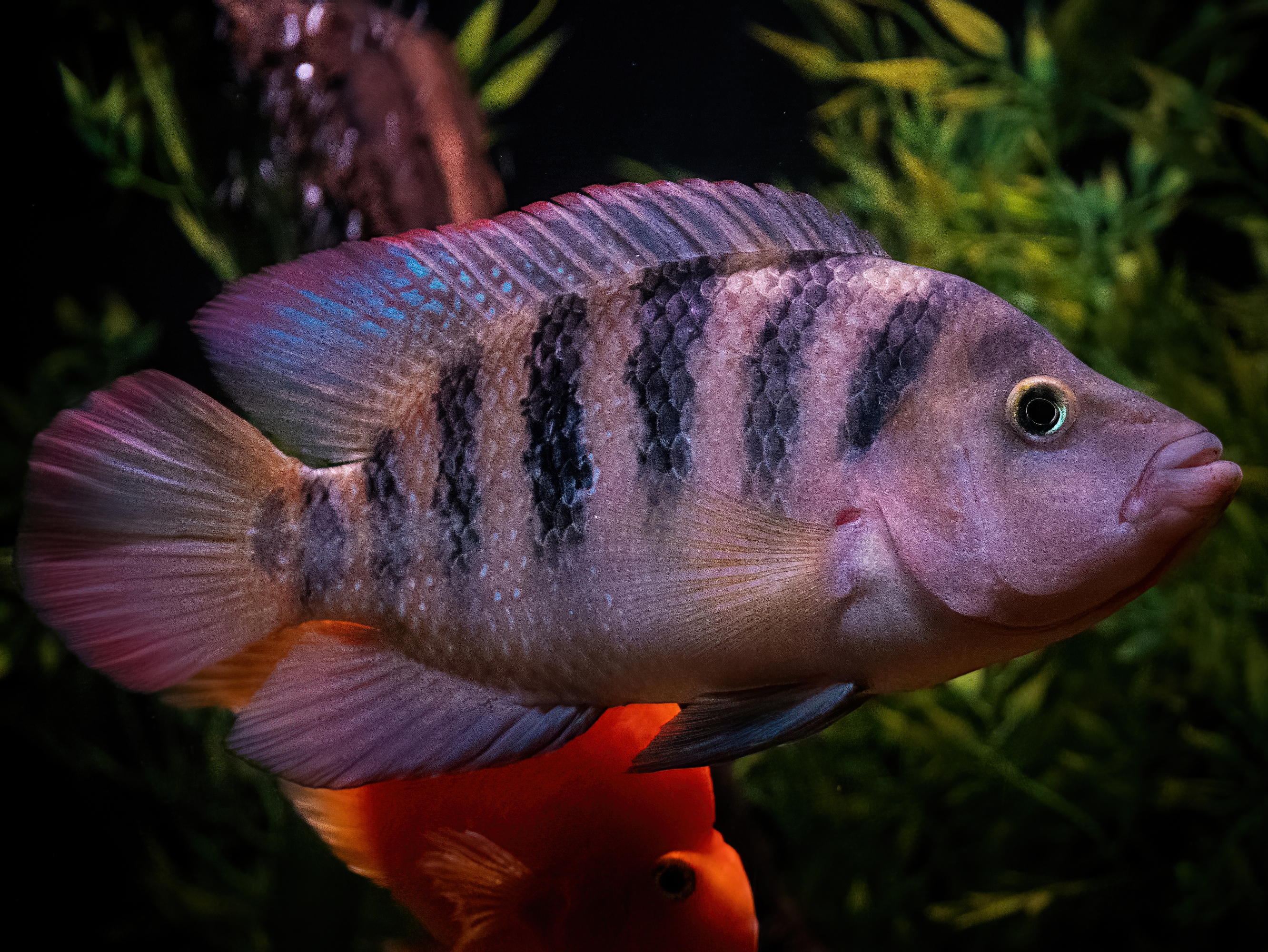

Conservation status
- Least Concern (IUCN 3.1)

Scientific classification
- Kingdom: Animalia
- Phylum: Chordata
- Class: Actinopterygii
- Order: Cichliformes
- Family: Cichlidae
- Genus: Mayaheros
- Species: M. urophthalmus

Binomial name
- Mayaheros urophthalmus (Günther, 1862)

Synonyms
- Heros urophthalmus Günther, 1862; Cichlasoma urophthalmum

= Mayaheros urophthalmus =

Species of large cichlid fish from Middle America

Mayaheros urophthalmus, also known as the Mayan cichlid or Mexican mojarra, is a species of cichlid.

== Taxonomy ==
Previously, this species was placed in the genus Cichlasoma and the subgeneric section Nandopsis; that genus is now in revision and has been restricted to the 12 species of South American cichlids related to Cichlasoma bimaculatum. Thus, many of the roughly 100 species that were formerly members of Cichlasoma have yet to be formally assigned to new genera.

== Distribution ==
This species can be found in Middle America. It is native to the Atlantic slope of tropical Mesoamerica, ranging from eastern Mexico southward to Nicaragua. It was first recorded from Everglades National Park, Florida, in 1983, and is now a common nonindigenous fish in South Florida.

== Habitat ==
The Mayan cichlid inhabits freshwater marshes, mangrove swamps, lakes, rivers, rocky shorelines, lagoons, estuaries, and coastal islands. Adults prefer coastal lagoons and rivers, and may survive in marine conditions. It can be found in oxygen-rich areas near submerged vegetation and over muddy substrates. Despite its preference for waters with dissolved oxygen content of at least 3.5 mg/L, though, it is capable of surviving in extreme hypoxia, because it is an oxygen conformer, becoming much less active in hypoxic water, and even surviving virtual anoxia for up to two hours. Unusually, this fish has been recorded in some cenotes in the Yucatan Peninsula.

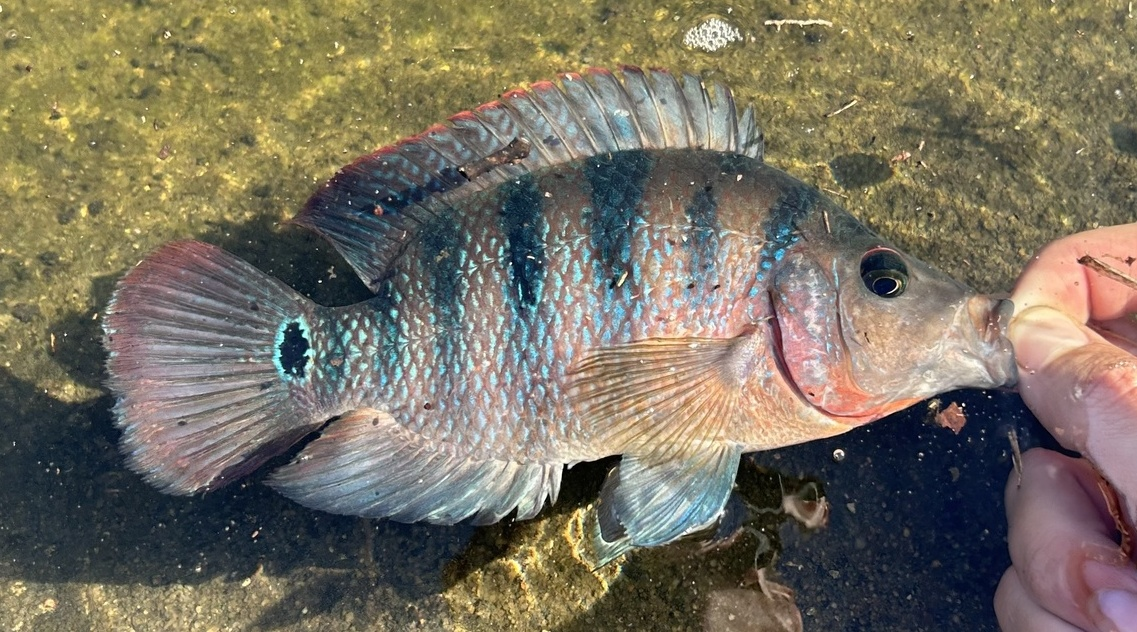
Introduced, in Florida (USA)

== Description ==
Mayaheros urophthalmus reaches a maximum length of 39.4 cm (15.5 in). This fish is one of the larger cichlids. Its body is oval and flattened on the sides and the head is tapering toward the mouth, and its fins are spiny. It has a base color of yellow-brown to gray-brown in most cases, that becomes intense red during breeding. The head and throat are reddish, especially in younger fish. The caudal fin and the soft sections of the dorsal and anal fins are usually more or less reddish. Six, wide, green-black vertical stripes run across the sides of the body between the base of the pectoral fin and the base of the caudal fin. A large black eye spot circled with blue-green is on the tail stem (hence the species scientific name urophthalmus, from oura, Greek for tail and ophthalmos, Greek for eye). Since its distribution area is relatively large, this species may occur in different colors, which may differ from the ones described above.

== Biology ==
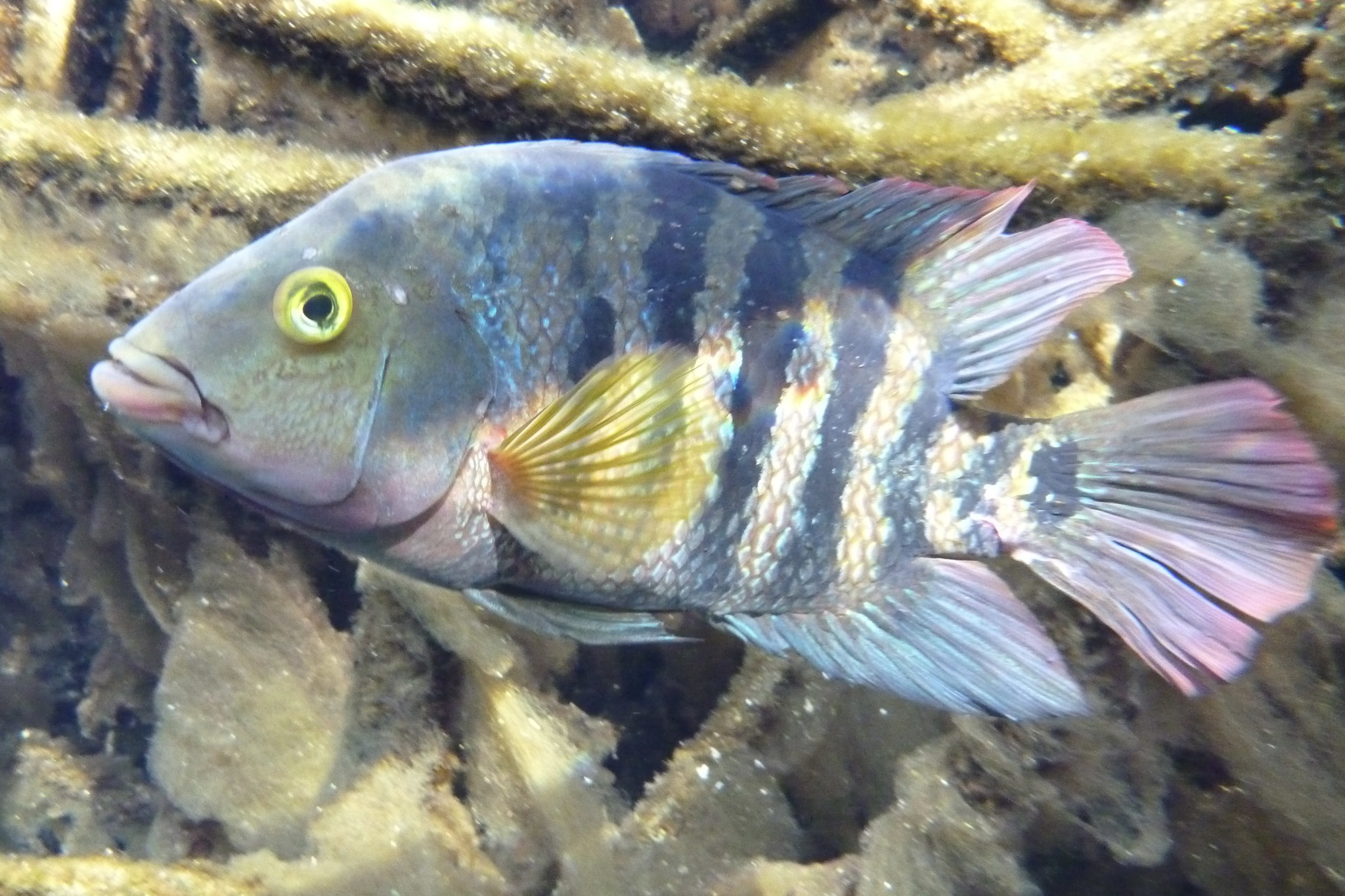
In its native range, Quintana Roo (MX)

The Mayan cichlid is philopatric, or site tenacious, i.e., individuals are not migratory and prefer to stay within a home range. It has a minimum temperature requirement of about 14 °C (57 °F). In its native range, it inhabits waters with temperatures from 18–34 °C (64–93 °F), but its optimal temperature range is 28–33 °C (82–91 °F).

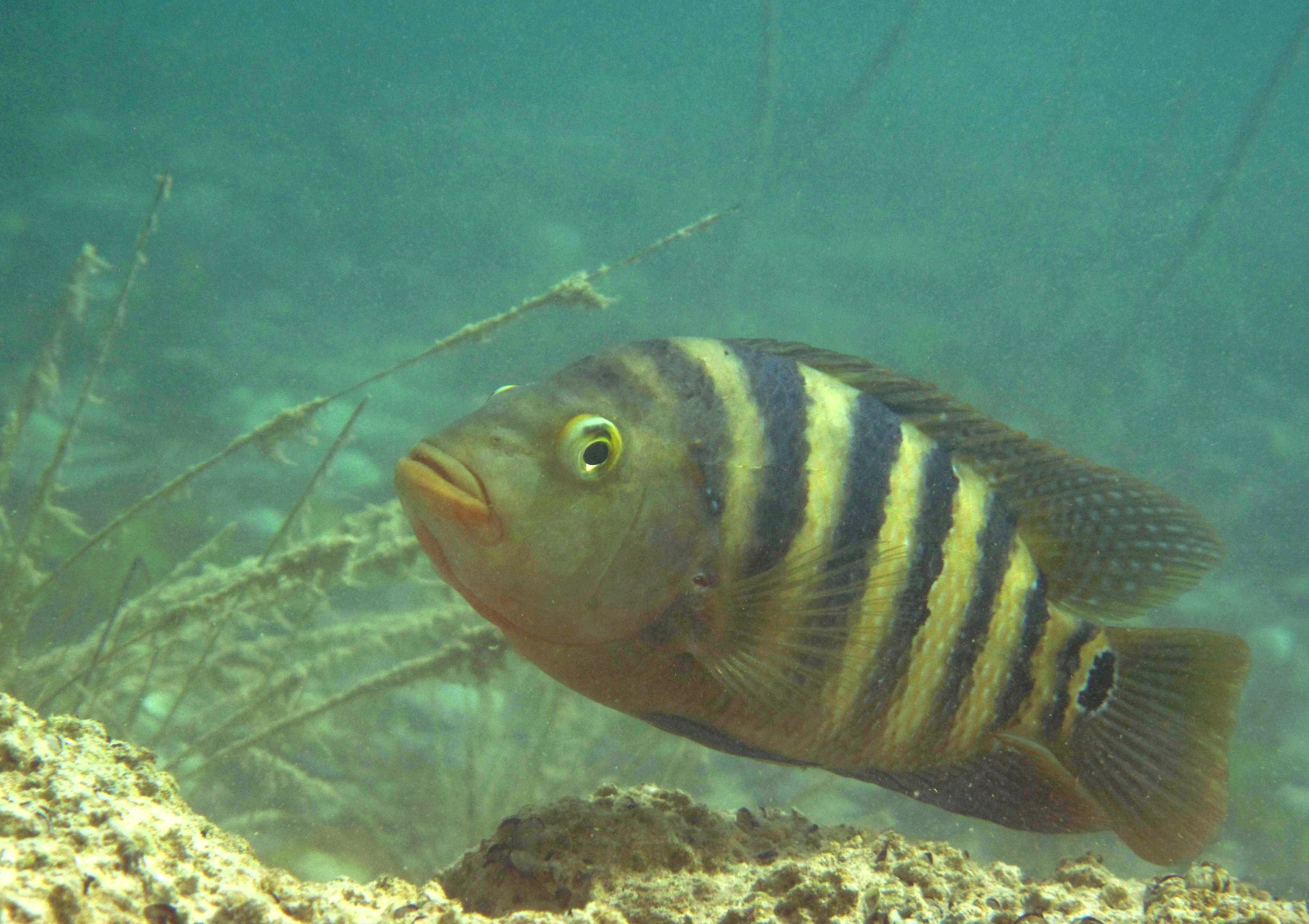
In Quintana Roo (MX)

The Mayan cichlid is capable of surviving in a variety of conditions. It is euryhaline and can survive in a range of salinity from 0 – 40 ppt. Experiments on captive specimens have shown that it can tolerate abrupt increases in salinity of up to 15 ppt. The Mayan cichlid has a broad range of tolerance to abiotic conditions and a broad functional repertoire to enable it to feed on about 20% of evasive prey due to its 6.8% jaw protrusion while feeding.

This species is also a dietary generalist, consuming organisms from a variety of disparate taxa. It is susceptible to malnourishment, though, apparently due to the requirement that a relatively large proportion of its diet be animal prey. The Mayan cichlid's diet includes plant matter, smaller fish, algae, detritus, snails, crustaceans, and insects.

== Reproduction ==
Mayan cichlids are territorial and aggressive when breeding; they are highly protective of their young and have several broods per year. This species is a monogamous, biparental, substrate spawner that exhibits minimal sexual dimorphism and guards its fry for up to 6 weeks. All of these traits are greatly developed and represent an extreme in the general pattern found in the genus Mayaheros. In Mexico, the Mayan cichlid spawns for a 9-month period from March to November, particularly during the wet season from June to September. This corresponds to a period when the water temperature is at least 24 °C. Multiple broods are raised per year. The fry appear to be adapted to lotic water. They exhibit strongly positive geotactic behavior, actively swimming down to the substrate upon hatching from the egg and adhering themselves to the bottom by means of three pairs of mucous glands.

== Human relevance ==
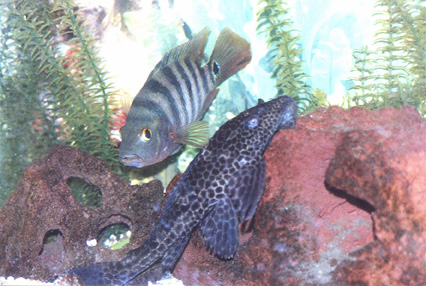
Mayaheros urophthalmus with Hypostomus plecostomus

In its native range, the Mayan cichlid is a popular food fish, so is the basis of a regional fishery and is commonly used in aquaculture. As in many animals, the red color is much more brilliant in wild specimens than captive ones, but one can help maintain some of its vibrance by feeding the fish live foods and foods that contain vitamin A, which breaks down into the red pigment beta carotene in the body.

It is among the most-studied of the Neotropical cichlids. To date, the Mayan cichlid has been most intensively studied at localities in southeastern Mexico on or near the Yucatán Peninsula.

In Thailand, it is listed as one of 13 aquatic species prohibited for import and possession, including cultivation by the Department of Fisheries alongside other species such as zebra tilapia (Heterotilapia buttikoferi) and blackchin tilapia (Sarotherodon melanotheron), etc.

== See also ==
- List of freshwater aquarium fish species
