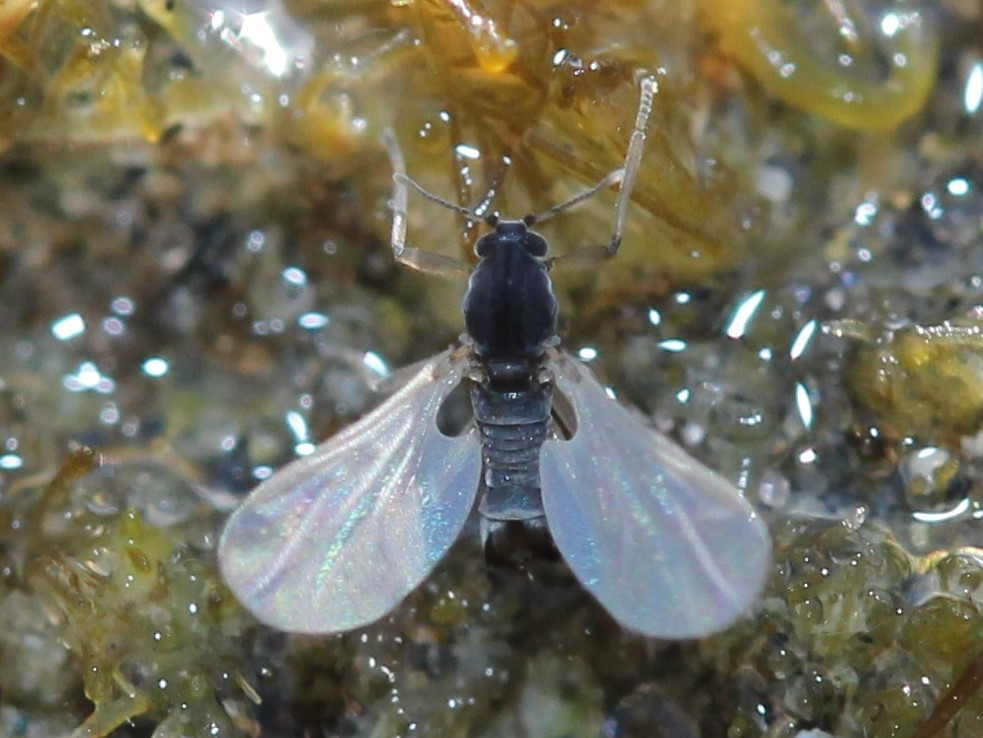

Scientific classification
- Domain: Eukaryota
- Kingdom: Animalia
- Phylum: Arthropoda
- Class: Insecta
- Order: Diptera
- Family: Chironomidae
- Genus: Clunio
- Species: C. californiensis

Binomial name
- Clunio californiensis Hashimoto, 1974

= Clunio californiensis =

Species of fly

Clunio californiensis is a species of midge in the family Chironomidae.
