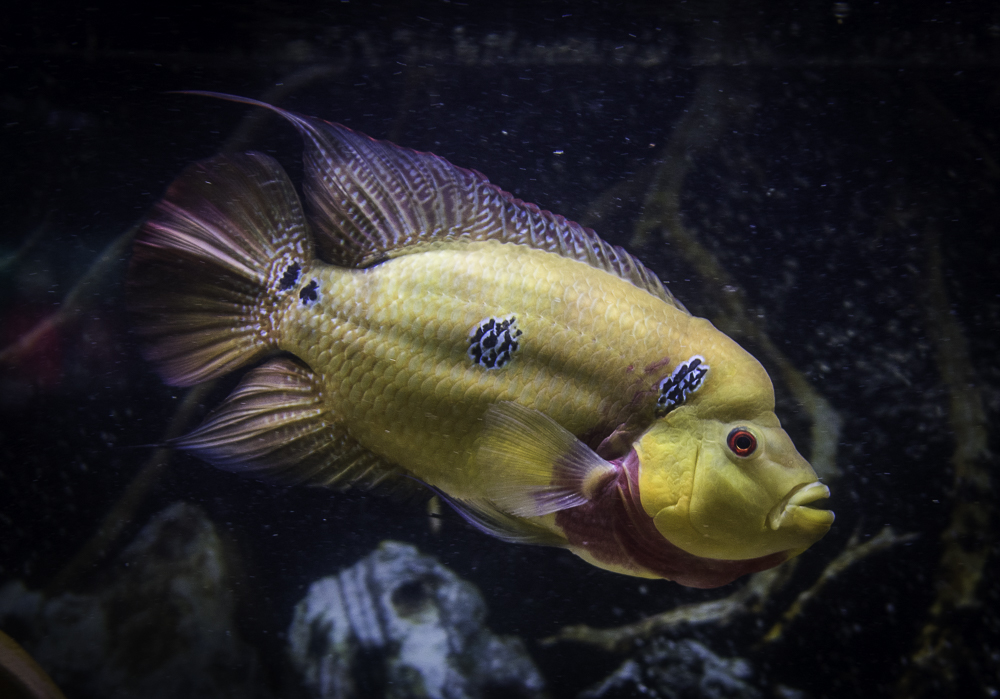
- Trimac F1 male three spot

Conservation status
- Least Concern (IUCN 3.1)

Scientific classification
- Kingdom: Animalia
- Phylum: Chordata
- Class: Actinopterygii
- Division: Teleostei
- Order: Cichliformes
- Family: Cichlidae
- Subfamily: Cichlinae
- Tribe: Heroini
- Genus: Amphilophus
- Species: A. trimaculatum

Binomial name
- Amphilophus trimaculatum (Günther, 1867)

Synonyms
- Heros trimaculatus Günther, 1867; Amphilophus trimaculatum (Günther, 1867); Cichlasoma trimaculatus (Günther, 1867); Cichlasoma mojarra Meek, 1904; Cichlasoma centrale Meek, 1906; Cichlasoma gordonsmithi Fowler, 1936; Cichlasoma cajali Álvarez & Gutierrez, 1953

= Three spot cichlid =

Species of fish

The three spot cichlid (Amphilophus trimaculatum), also known as the trimac or red-eyed cichlid, is a species of cichlid from Mexico and Central America, from the subfamily Cichlasomatinae. It is rarely found as an aquarium fish. Although still included as a highly aberrant member of Cichlasoma by FishBase, other authorities such as Catalog of Fishes have moved it to the genus Amphilophus.

== Appearance ==
The three spot cichlid is a large heavy bodied cichlid. It has a green or yellow hue base with the distinct spots on its sides. The male is much larger than the female growing up to 15" he has longer more pointed fins and a large red spot behind his gills. The female is smaller growing up to 9-10" and a less dominant red spot. The male may also grow a nuchal hump when mature.

== Distribution and habitat ==
The threespot cichlid is found in slow flowing stretches in the lower river valleys of the rivers of the Pacific Slope of Central America from Mexico to Panama, where there is a muddy or sandy substrate. Here it is found among the roots and weeds. It has been found as an introduced species in Florida and Nevada but these populations were extirpated, and in Singapore.

== Biology ==
The three spot cichlid feeds mainly on small fishes and invertebrates, including both aquatic and terrestrial insects. A large female may lay over 1,000 eggs and reach sexual maturity at a length of 8–10 centimetres (3.1–3.9 in), while for males this is attained at 12–14 centimetres (4.7–5.5 in). The pair usually select a flat stone and spawn on that, both parents guard the eggs fiercely and will also tend the fry after they have hatched.

== In the aquarium ==
Trimacs cichlids are rarely found in the aquarium trade. It is thought that the three spot cichlid was used in the creation of the hybrid flowerhorn cichlid.
