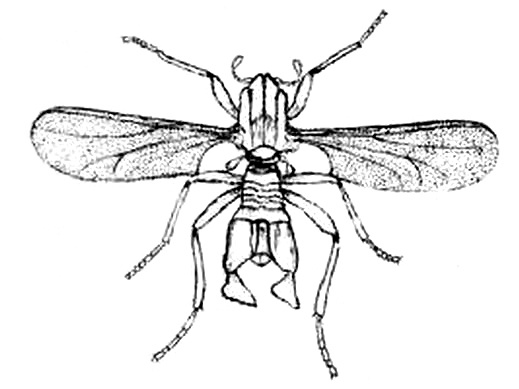

Scientific classification
- Kingdom: Animalia
- Phylum: Arthropoda
- Class: Insecta
- Order: Diptera
- Family: Chironomidae
- Genus: Clunio
- Species: C. marinus

Binomial name
- Clunio marinus Haliday, 1855

= Clunio marinus =

Species of midge

Clunio marinus is a species of non-biting midge in the bloodworm family (Chironomidae). It is found in the intertidal zone of the European Atlantic coast from Spain to Iceland. The species is a long-standing model system in chronobiology, particularly for circalunar clocks and the evolution of biological clocks. Its genome has been sequenced.
