= Axel Meyer =

German zoologist

Axel Meyer (born 4 August 1960) is a German evolutionary biologist and a professor of zoology and evolutionary biology at the University of Konstanz, Germany.

Meyer is best known for his work on the evolution and adaptive radiation of African cichlid fishes, fish-specific genome duplications, molecular phylogenetics of vertebrates, and the role of ecological and sexual selection in speciation.

== Education and previous employment ==
Meyer attended the gymnasium (high school) Katharineum in Lübeck. He was an undergraduate at the Universität Marburg (1979–1982), and completed his undergraduate thesis at the Universität Kiel and the University of Miami (1982). He received both his master's and PhD from the Department of Zoology at the University of California Berkeley in 1984 and 1988 respectively. He spent one year as a visiting student in Harvard University's Department of Organismic and Evolutionary Biology (1986–1987).

Meyer was an Alfred P. Sloan Postdoctoral Fellow in Molecular Evolution at University of California Berkeley with Allan C. Wilson, before joining the faculty in the Department of Ecology and Evolution at the State University of New York (SUNY) at Stony Brook as an assistant professor. In 1993 he received tenure and was promoted to associate professor. Meyer joined the Universität Konstanz Department of Biology as a full professor in 1997.

== Communication of science ==
Meyer is active in the communication of science to the public. He has written more than 70 articles for major German newspapers including Die Zeit and the Frankfurter Allgemeine Zeitung. In addition, he contributed a weekly column, Quantensprung, on matters related to science and evolution to the Handelsblatt from 2005 to 2010. The first 100 articles of Quantensprung were published in 2008 in the book Evolution ist überall. In 2008 for his effort in communicating with the public he received the EMBO Award for communication in the Life Sciences. "MBO awards the prize annually to a practicing scientist in Europe for outstanding communication with the public. Axel Meyer receives the award in recognition of his continuous endeavour to convey complex scientific topics to the general public in an accessible and thought-provoking manner."

== Awards and recognition ==
Meyer is an elected member of the Academy of Europe, the Academia Europaea, German Academy of Sciences Leopoldina, the European Academy of Sciences and Arts, the European Molecular Biology Organization, and the Berlin-Brandenburgische Akademie der Wissenschaften.

He has received numerous awards including the Carus Medal from the German Academy of Sciences Leopoldina (2009), the John Simon Guggenheim Memorial Fellowship (1996), the Young Investigator Prize from the American Society of Naturalists (1990)., and Hector Science Award 2012. Most recently (2017), he was awarded a Radcliffe Fellowship at Harvard University's Radcliffe Institute for Advanced Study. His scientific work is widely cited by his peers and has been covered by national and international press and media.

== Controversies ==
=== Scientific misconduct ===
In 2003, Meyer was accused of several cases of misconduct in a complaint that was filed by 16 former students and postdocs. The initial accusations included violation of intellectual property rights, plagiarism, disregard of author rights, misappropriation of research funds, fabrication of results, threats against lab members and posting misleading job advertisements, however, most of the allegations could not be confirmed. In reaction to the accusations, the university launched an investigation led by law professor Dieter Lorenz.

The commission published their report in 2004 and found Meyer to be not guilty of any fabrication of results or misappropriation of funds. However, the commission stated Meyer was "'damaging the scientific interests' of lab members by, for example, placing 'misleading job advertisements' and 'blocking the publication of a lab member's paper for more than 2 years.'" The report was also criticized, as the job advertisements in question were placed in accordance to common practice and signed by the rectorate, and because the commission also did not speak to any of the 16 complainants before affirming their accusations. The final report criticized Meyer for not respecting personal matters of research assistants. According to Science, the internal commission reported that "Meyer claimed ownership of other people's intellectual property". However, Professor Lorenz, stated that the phrase intellectual property was not meant "as a legal term". The complainants noted at the time that they were met by institutional resistance from the University of Konstanz and any consequences imposed by the university were never reported.

In 2004, 36 of Axel Meyer's students, postdocs and scientific collaborators published a letter of support in Nature with the title: "Meyer: disagreements but no misconduct". They claimed they "[…] were surprised by the committee's decision to accept some of the complaints […]. Our own experiences of working in or collaborating with Axel Meyer's lab have been far more positive. Those of us who have published with Meyer found that he provided crucial intellectual contributions to manuscripts." Furthermore, the group underlines: "Collaboration with Meyer took place in a fair, open and cooperative atmosphere."

=== Laziness and dishonesty of students ===
In 2015, Axel Meyer wrote an article for FAZ (Frankfurter Allgemeine Zeitung) describing German university students as lazy and dishonest. Despite a long history of publicly funded post secondary education in Germany, Meyer argued that the tuition-free education system made today's students spoiled and entitled compared to those in the United States – though the US faces increasingly high rates of student debt.

Meyer felt compelled to write the piece after his office had been broken into two days before an exam. Upon finding markings around the lock to his office at the University of Konstanz he notified the police who informed him that occasionally students attempt to break into offices to steal exams. Though the police also reported that several offices had been compromised for the purpose of stealing cash and no evidence suggested the culprit was a student. Regardless, Meyer contemplates in his article: "Would students break into the office of a professor to steal the exam topic?" And then goes on to say: "At least I would not be surprised if that were the case." One of his most inflammatory statements colorfully illustrates his view of students: "In jeder Hinsicht wird ihnen der Hintern gepudert und mit viel Fürsorge und Verständnis jede Faulheit und Inkompetenz vergeben" – which translates to "In every way are their butts carefully powdered and laziness and incompetence is forgiven with care and understanding."

The rector of the University of Konstanz, Ulrich Rüdiger, apologized personally and described several passages in Meyer's article as "defamatory and insulting", suggesting possible consequences for Meyer though no official consequences were reported.

In a circular letter of the Rector of the university professors, the rector testified that Meyer had publicly spread several "false factual claims about the conditions at the University of Konstanz." Meyer apologized for his choice of words but not for his message. Students countered that Meyer himself was not giving his lectures, but rather divvying them up among his PhD students and postdoctoral researchers.

== Scientific impact ==
With an h-index of 120 according to Google Scholar, Meyer is one of the most cited evolutionary biologists in the world (As of 2021). He has published more than 400 peer-reviewed papers in disciplines ranging from zoology, phylogenetics, evolutionary developmental biology, to molecular evolution and comparative genomics, including a 1989 PCR protocol that is a citation classic. Of those, more than 20 scientific articles were published in Nature, the world's most highly cited interdisciplinary science journal, and nine in Science.
