= Nandaime =

- Municipality
- Location in Nicaragua
- Coordinates: 11°45′N 86°03′W
- Country: Nicaragua
- Department: Granada

Government
  - Mayor: Guillermo Martínez

Area
  - Municipality: 144 sq mi (372 km^{2})
- Elevation: 460 ft (140 m)

Population (2022 estimate)
  - Municipality: 41,852
  - Density: 291/sq mi (113/km^{2})
  - Urban: 21,808
- Climate: Aw

Nandaime is a town and a municipality in the Granada department of Nicaragua.

Nandaime is a small town in the southwestern part of the country. It is located on the Panamerican highway which crosses the Pacific area of Nicaragua, at a distance of 67 km from Managua, capital of the Republic, and 20 kilometers from Granada, the departmental capital. The patron saints are St. Anne and San Joaquín. It was elevated to city on October 29, 1890.

The name Nandaime is derived from the Chorotega word "nanda" (meaning "arroyo", or stream) and the suffix "-ime" (indicating abundance). Nandaime means "place of abundant streams".

== Climate ==
Climate data for Nandaime (1961–1990)
Month	Jan	Feb	Mar	Apr	May	Jun	Jul	Aug	Sep	Oct	Nov	Dec	Year
Mean daily maximum °C (°F)	30.3 (86.5)	31.1 (88.0)	32.2 (90.0)	32.9 (91.2)	32.7 (90.9)	30.5 (86.9)	30.2 (86.4)	30.7 (87.3)	30.5 (86.9)	29.9 (85.8)	30.0 (86.0)	30.1 (86.2)	30.9 (87.6)
Daily mean °C (°F)	26.1 (79.0)	26.6 (79.9)	27.5 (81.5)	28.4 (83.1)	28.2 (82.8)	25.9 (78.6)	26.7 (80.1)	26.7 (80.1)	26.5 (79.7)	26.1 (79.0)	26.0 (78.8)	25.9 (78.6)	26.7 (80.1)
Mean daily minimum °C (°F)	22.3 (72.1)	22.4 (72.3)	22.2 (72.0)	24.0 (75.2)	24.2 (75.6)	24.4 (75.9)	24.4 (75.9)	23.2 (73.8)	22.7 (72.9)	23.4 (74.1)	22.3 (72.1)	22.5 (72.5)	23.2 (73.8)
Average precipitation mm (inches)	7 (0.3)	2 (0.1)	4 (0.2)	21 (0.8)	195 (7.7)	239 (9.4)	146 (5.7)	150 (5.9)	277 (10.9)	295 (11.6)	75 (3.0)	17 (0.7)	1,429 (56.3)
Average precipitation days (≥ 1.0 mm)	1	0	1	1	9	16	13	15	17	17	8	4	101
Source: National Oceanic and Atmospheric Administration
