= Sympatric speciation =

Evolution of a new species from an ancestor in the same location

In sympatric speciation, reproductive isolation evolves within a population without the aid of geographic barriers.

Sympatric speciation is the evolution of a new species from a surviving ancestral species while both continue to inhabit the same geographic region. In evolutionary biology and biogeography, sympatric and sympatry are terms referring to organisms whose ranges overlap so that they occur together at least in some places. If these organisms are closely related (e.g. sister species), such a distribution may be the result of sympatric speciation. Etymologically, sympatry is derived from Greek συν (sun-) 'together' and πατρίς (patrís) 'fatherland'. The term was coined by Edward Bagnall Poulton in 1904, who explains the derivation.

Sympatric speciation is one of three traditional geographic modes of speciation. Allopatric speciation is the evolution of species caused by the geographic isolation of two or more populations of a species. In this case, divergence is facilitated by the absence of gene flow. Parapatric speciation is the evolution of geographically adjacent populations into distinct species. In this case, divergence occurs despite limited interbreeding where the two diverging groups come into contact. In sympatric speciation, there is no geographic barrier to interbreeding, but reproductive isolation arises due to ecological, behavioral, or genetic differences. These categories are special cases of a continuum from zero (sympatric) to complete (allopatric) spatial segregation of diverging groups.

In multicellular eukaryotic organisms, sympatric speciation is a plausible process that is known to occur, but the frequency with which it occurs is not known. In bacteria, however, the analogous process (defined as "the origin of new bacterial species that occupy definable ecological niches") might be more common because bacteria are less constrained by the homogenizing effects of sexual reproduction and are prone to comparatively dramatic and rapid genetic change through horizontal gene transfer.

== Evidence ==
Sympatric speciation events are quite common in plants, which are prone to acquiring multiple homologous sets of chromosomes, resulting in polyploidy. The polyploid offspring occupy the same environment as the parent plants (hence sympatry), but are reproductively isolated.

A number of models have been proposed for alternative modes of sympatric speciation. The most popular, which invokes the disruptive selection model, was first put forward by John Maynard Smith in 1966. Maynard Smith suggested that homozygous individuals may, under particular environmental conditions, have a greater fitness than those with alleles heterozygous for a certain trait. Under the mechanism of natural selection, therefore, homozygosity would be favoured over heterozygosity, eventually leading to speciation. Sympatric divergence could also result from the sexual conflict.

Disruption may also occur in multiple-gene traits. The medium ground finch (Geospiza fortis) is showing gene pool divergence in a population on Santa Cruz Island. Beak morphology conforms to two different size ideals, while intermediate individuals are selected against. Some characteristics (termed magic traits) such as beak morphology may drive speciation because they also affect mating signals. In this case, different beak phenotypes may result in different bird calls, providing a barrier to exchange between the gene pools.

A somewhat analogous system has been reported in horseshoe bats, in which echolocation call frequency appears to be a magic trait. In these bats, the constant frequency component of the call not only determines prey size but may also function in aspects of social communication. Work from one species, the large-eared horseshoe bat (Rhinolophus philippinensis), shows that abrupt changes in call frequency among sympatric morphs is correlated with reproductive isolation. A further well-studied circumstance of sympatric speciation is when insects feed on more than one species of host plant. In this case insects become specialized as they struggle to overcome the various plants' defense mechanisms. (Drès and Mallet, 2002)

Rhagoletis pomonella, the apple maggot, may be currently undergoing sympatric or, more precisely, heteropatric (see heteropatry) speciation. The apple feeding race of this species appears to have spontaneously emerged from the hawthorn feeding race in the 1800–1850 AD time frame, after apples were first introduced into North America. The apple feeding race does not now normally feed on hawthorns, and the hawthorn feeding race does not now normally feed on apples. This may be an early step towards the emergence of a new species.

Some parasitic ants may have evolved via sympatric speciation. Isolated and relatively homogeneous habitats such as crater lakes and islands are among the best geographical settings in which to demonstrate sympatric speciation. For example, Nicaragua crater lake cichlid fishes include nine described species and dozens of undescribed species that have evolved by sympatric speciation. Monostroma latissimum, a marine green algae, also shows sympatric speciation in southwest Japanese islands. Although panmictic, the molecular phylogenetics using nuclear introns revealed staggering diversification of population.

African cichlids also offer some evidence for sympatric speciation. They show a large amount of diversity in the African Great Lakes. Many studies point to sexual selection as a way of maintaining reproductive isolation. Female choice with regards to male coloration is one of the more studied modes of sexual selection in African cichlids. Female choice is present in cichlids because the female does much of the work in raising the offspring, while the male has little energy input in the offspring. She exerts sensory bias when picking males by choosing those that have colors similar to her or those that are the most colorful. This helps maintain sympatric speciation within the lakes. Cichlids also use acoustic reproductive communication. The male cichlid quivers as a ritualistic display for the female which produces a certain number of pulses and pulse period. Female choice for good genes and sensory bias is one of the deciding factors in this case, selecting for calls that are within her species and that give the best fitness advantage to increase the survivability of the offspring. Male-male competition is a form of intrasexual selection and also has an effect on speciation in African cichlids. Ritualistic fighting among males establishes which males are going to be more successful in mating. This is important in sympatric speciation because species with similar males may be competing for the same females. There may be a fitness advantage for one phenotype that could allow one species to invade another. Studies show this effect in species that are genetically similar, have the capability to interbreed, and show phenotypic color variation. Ecological character displacement is another means for sympatric speciation. Within each lake there are different niches that a species could occupy. For example, different diets and depth of the water could help to maintain isolation between species in the same lake.

Allochrony offers some empirical evidence that sympatric speciation has taken place, as many examples exist of recently diverged (sister taxa) allochronic species. A case of ongoing sympatric divergence due to allochrony might be found in the marine insect Clunio marinus.

A rare example of sympatric speciation in animals is the divergence of "resident" and "transient" orca forms in the northeast Pacific. Resident and transient orcas inhabit the same waters, but avoid each other and do not interbreed. The two forms hunt different prey species and have different diets, vocal behaviour, and social structures. Some divergences between species could also result from contrasts in microhabitats. A population bottleneck occurred around 200,000 years ago greatly reducing the population size at the time as well as the variance of genes which allowed several ecotypes to emerge afterwards.

The European polecat (Mustela putorius) exhibited a rare dark phenotype similar to the European mink (Mustela lutreola) phenotype, which is directly influenced by peculiarities of forest brooks.

== Controversy ==
For some time it was difficult to prove that sympatric speciation was possible, because it was impossible to observe it happening. It was believed by many, and championed by Ernst Mayr, that the theory of evolution by natural selection could not explain how two species could emerge from one if the subspecies were able to interbreed. Since Mayr's heyday in the 1940s and 50s, mechanisms have been proposed that explain how speciation might occur in the face of interbreeding, also known as gene flow. And even more recently concrete examples of sympatric divergence have been empirically studied. The debate now turns to how often sympatric speciation may actually occur in nature and how much of life's diversity it may be responsible for.

=== History ===
The German evolutionary biologist Ernst Mayr argued in the 1940s that speciation cannot occur without geographic, and thus reproductive, isolation. He stated that gene flow is the inevitable result of sympatry, which is known to squelch genetic differentiation between populations. Thus, a physical barrier must be present, he believed, at least temporarily, in order for a new biological species to arise. This hypothesis is the source of much controversy around the possibility of sympatric speciation. Mayr's hypothesis was popular and consequently quite influential, but is now widely disputed.

The first to propose what is now the most pervasive hypothesis on how sympatric speciation may occur was John Maynard Smith, in 1966. He came up with the idea of disruptive selection. He figured that if two ecological niches are occupied by a single species, diverging selection between the two niches could eventually cause reproductive isolation. By adapting to have the highest possible fitness in the distinct niches, two species may emerge from one even if they remain in the same area, and even if they are mating randomly.

=== Defining sympatry ===
Investigating the possibility of sympatric speciation requires a definition thereof, especially in the 21st century, when mathematical modeling is used to investigate or to predict evolutionary phenomena. Much of the controversy concerning sympatric speciation may lie solely on an argument over what sympatric divergence actually is. The use of different definitions by researchers is a great impediment to empirical progress on the matter. The dichotomy between sympatric and allopatric speciation is no longer accepted by the scientific community. It is more useful to think of a continuum, on which there are limitless levels of geographic and reproductive overlap between species. On one extreme is allopatry, in which the overlap is zero (no gene flow), and on the other extreme is sympatry, in which the ranges overlap completely (maximal gene flow).

The varying definitions of sympatric speciation fall generally into two categories: definitions based on biogeography, or on population genetics. As a strictly geographical concept, sympatric speciation is defined as one species diverging into two while the ranges of both nascent species overlap entirely – this definition is not specific enough about the original population to be useful in modeling.

Definitions based on population genetics are not necessarily spatial or geographical in nature, and can sometimes be more restrictive. These definitions deal with the demographics of a population, including allele frequencies, selection, population size, the probability of gene flow based on sex ratio, life cycles, etc. The main discrepancy between the two types of definitions tends to be the necessity for "panmixia". Population genetics definitions of sympatry require that mating be dispersed randomly – or that it be equally likely for an individual to mate with either subspecies, in one area as another, or on a new host as a nascent one: this is also known as panmixia. Population genetics definitions, also known as non-spatial definitions, thus require the real possibility for random mating, and do not always agree with spatial definitions on what is and what is not sympatry.

For example, micro-allopatry, also known as macro-sympatry, is a condition where there are two populations whose ranges overlap completely, but contact between the species is prevented because they occupy completely different ecological niches (such as diurnal vs. nocturnal). This can often be caused by host-specific parasitism, which causes dispersal to look like a mosaic across the landscape. Micro-allopatry is included as sympatry according to spatial definitions, but, as it does not satisfy panmixia, it is not considered sympatry according to population genetics definitions.

Mallet et al. (2002) claims that the new non-spatial definition is lacking in an ability to settle the debate about whether sympatric speciation regularly occurs in nature. They suggest using a spatial definition, but one that includes the role of dispersal, also known as cruising range, so as to represent more accurately the possibility for gene flow. They assert that this definition should be useful in modeling. They also state that under this definition, sympatric speciation seems plausible.

=== Current state of the controversy ===
Evolutionary theory as well as mathematical models have predicted some plausible mechanisms for the divergence of species without a physical barrier. In addition there have now been several studies that have identified speciation that has occurred, or is occurring with gene flow (see section above: evidence). Molecular studies have been able to show that, in some cases where there is no chance for allopatry, species continue to diverge. One such example is a pair of species of isolated desert palms. Two distinct, but closely related species exist on the same island, but they occupy two distinct soil types found on the island, each with a drastically different pH balance. Because they are palms they send pollen through the air they could freely interbreed, except that speciation has already occurred, so that they do not produce viable hybrids. This is hard evidence for the fact that, in at least some cases, fully sympatric species really do experience diverging selection due to competition, in this case for a spot in the soil.

This, and the other few concrete examples that have been found, are just that; they're few, so they tell us little about how often sympatry actually results in speciation in a more typical context. The burden now lies on providing evidence for sympatric divergence occurring in non-isolated habitats. It is not known how much of the earth's diversity it could be responsible for. Some still say that panmixia should slow divergence, and thus sympatric speciation should be possible but rare (1). Meanwhile, others claim that much of the earth's diversity could be due to speciation without geographic isolation. The difficulty in supporting a sympatric speciation hypothesis has always been that an allopatric scenario could always be invented, and those can be hard to rule out – but with modern molecular genetic techniques can be used to support the theory.

In 2015 Cichlid fish from a tiny volcanic crater lake in Africa were observed in the act of sympatric speciation using DNA sequencing methods. A study found a complex combination of ecological separation and mate choice preference had allowed two ecomorphs to genetically separate even in the presence of some genetic exchange.

== Heteropatric speciation ==
Heteropatric speciation is a special case of sympatric speciation that occurs when different ecotypes or races of the same species geographically coexist but exploit different niches in the same patchy or heterogeneous environment. It is thus is a refinement of sympatric speciation, with a behavioral, rather than geographical barrier to the flow of genes among diverging groups within a population. Behavioral separation as a mechanism for promoting sympatric speciation in a heterogeneous (or patchwork landscape) was highlighted in John Maynard Smith's seminal paper on sympatric speciation. In recognition of the importance of this behavioral versus geographic distinction, Wayne Getz and Veijo Kaitala introduced the term heteropatry in their extension of Maynard Smiths' analysis of conditions that facilitate sympatric speciation.

Although some evolutionary biologists still regard sympatric speciation as highly contentious, both theoretical and empirical studies support it as a likely explanation of the diversity of life in particular ecosystems. Arguments implicate competition and niche separation of sympatric ecological variants that evolve through assortative mating into separate races and then species. Assortative mating most easily occurs if mating is linked to niche preference, as occurs in the apple maggot Rhagoletis pomonella, where individual flies from different races use volatile odors to discriminate between hawthorn and apple and look for mates on natal fruit. The term heteropatry semantically resolves the issue of sympatric speciation by reducing it to a scaling issue in terms of the way the landscape is used by individuals versus populations. From a population perspective, the process looks sympatric, but from an individual's perspective, the process looks allopatric, once the time spent flying over or moving quickly through intervening non-preferred niches is taken into account.

== See also ==
- Adaptive radiation
- Cladistics
- Ecotype
- History of speciation
- Hybrid speciation
- Phylogenetics
- Polymorphism (biology)
- Polyploidy
- Reinforcement
- Laboratory experiments of speciation
- Taxonomy
