= Jinotepe, Carazo =

Jinotepe
- Municipality
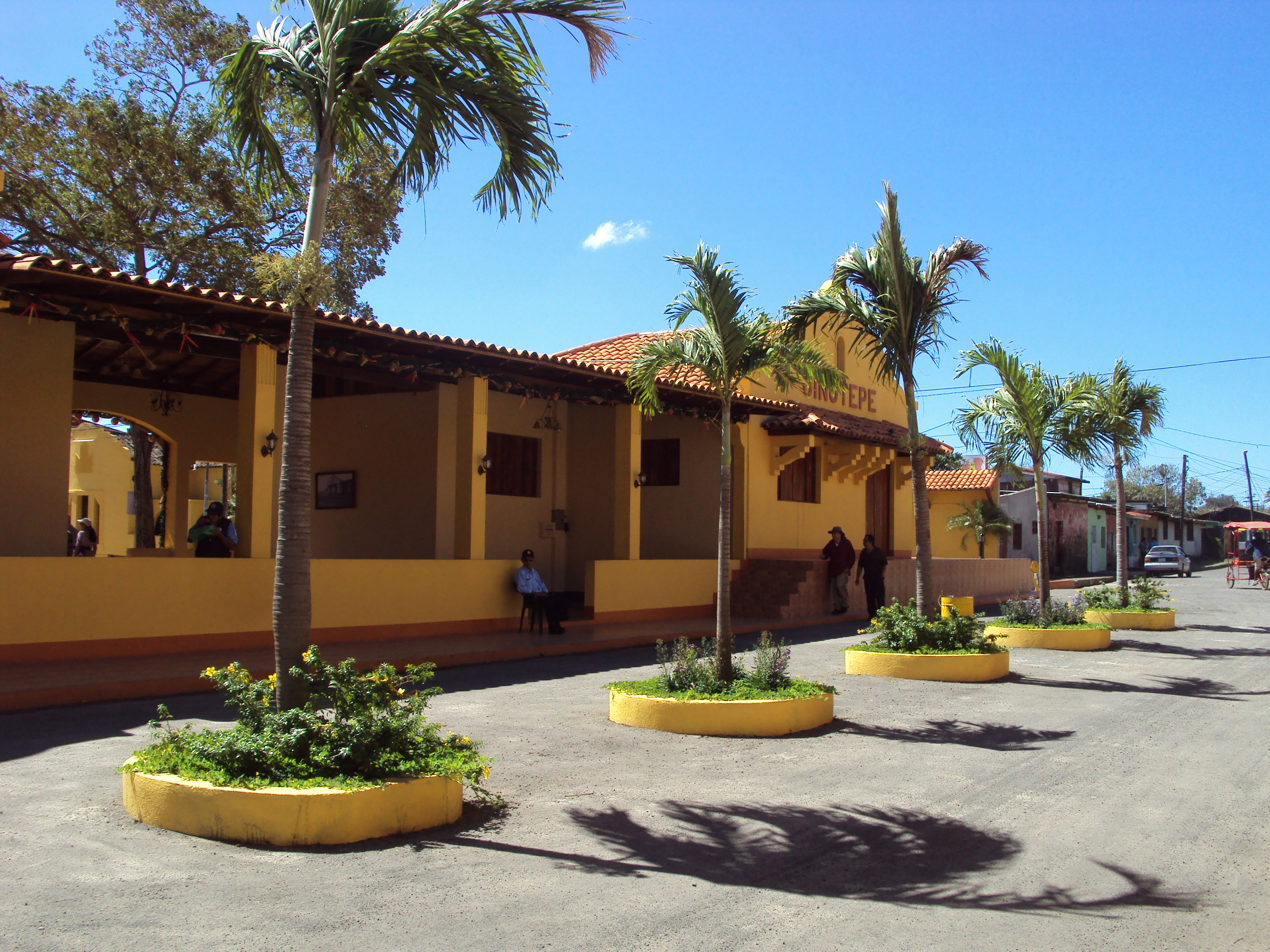
- Old Jinotepe train station

- Flag

- Location in Nicaragua
- Coordinates: 11°51′N 86°12′W
- Country: Nicaragua
- Department: Carazo Department

Area
  - Municipality: 281 km^{2} (108 sq mi)

Population (2022 estimate)
  - Municipality: 55,333
  - Density: 197/km^{2} (510/sq mi)
  - Urban: 40,361

Jinotepe (Spanish pronunciation: [xinoˈtepe]) is a city and municipality in the Carazo department of Nicaragua. The Indigenous inhabitants of Jinotepe are the Chorotegas and Nahuas.

It borders with Managua, Masaya, Granada, and Rivas.

== Toponymy ==
Jinotepe comes from the Nawat language, and is named after the Nahua chiefdom of Xinotepet, which was located in the present-day department of Carazo.

== Geography ==
=== Climate ===
Jinotepe, like much of Western Nicaragua except for the Sierras, has a tropical climate with constant temperatures averaging between 28 and 32 °C (82 and 90 °F). Under Köppen’s climate classification, the city has a tropical wet and dry climate. A distinct dry season exists between November and April, while most of the rainfall is received between May and October. Temperatures are highest in March and April, when the sun lies directly overhead and the summer rainfall has yet to begin.

Climate data for Jinotepe, Nicaragua
Month	Jan	Feb	Mar	Apr	May	Jun	Jul	Aug	Sep	Oct	Nov	Dec	Year
Mean daily maximum °C (°F)	31.0 (87.8)	32.1 (89.8)	33.6 (92.5)	34.3 (93.7)	34.0 (93.2)	31.4 (88.5)	30.9 (87.6)	31.4 (88.5)	30.3 (86.5)	30.8 (87.4)	30.6 (87.1)	30.8 (87.4)	31.8 (89.2)
Mean daily minimum °C (°F)	20.4 (68.7)	20.6 (69.1)	21.7 (71.1)	22.6 (72.7)	23.4 (74.1)	23.0 (73.4)	22.6 (72.7)	22.4 (72.3)	22.2 (72.0)	22.1 (71.8)	20.9 (69.6)	20.0 (68.0)	21.8 (71.2)
Average rainfall mm (inches)	9 (0.4)	5 (0.2)	3 (0.1)	8 (0.3)	130 (5.1)	224 (8.8)	144 (5.7)	136 (5.4)	215 (8.5)	280 (11.0)	42 (1.7)	8 (0.3)	1,204 (47.5)
Average rainy days (≥ 1.0 mm)	1	0	0	0	11	13	15	15	15	15	5	0	90
Average relative humidity (%)	69	64	62	61	70	80	79	81	82	83	78	73	74
Mean monthly sunshine hours	263.5	254.2	291.4	276.0	229.4	186.0	151.9	195.3	210.0	223.2	231.0	248.0	2,759.9
Source: Wetter Spiegel online

== Sports ==
Home of the baseball team cafeteros de carazo.

== International relations ==
=== Twin towns – Sister cities ===
Jinotepe is twinned with:

- (United States) Santa Cruz, California, California
