= Carazo Department =

Department of Nicaragua

Coordinates: 11°51′N 86°12′W

Carazo Departamento de Carazo
- Department
- Flag

- Location within Nicaragua
- Country: Nicaragua
- Capital: Jinotepe
- Largest city: Diriamba

Area
  - Department: 1,081 km^{2} (417 sq mi)

Population (2021 estimate)
  - Department: 198,395
  - Density: 183.5/km^{2} (475.3/sq mi)
  - Urban: 129,009
- ISO 3166 code: NI-CA

Carazo (Spanish pronunciation: [kaˈɾaso]) is a department in Nicaragua. It covers an area of 1,081 km^{2} (417 sq mi) and has a population of 198,395 (2021 estimate). The capital is Jinotepe.

== Geography ==
Much of the department consists of a large plain sloping gently down towards the Pacific Ocean. The main urban centres are Diriamba and Jinotepe in the interior. The adjoining departments are Managua, Masaya, Granada and Rivas.

The climate is tropical with the temperature varying between 28 and 32 °C (82 and 90 °F). The hottest months are April and May. The rain falls mainly between May and October and the rest of the year is dry.

== Economy and tourism ==
The inland part of the department produces a variety of agricultural crops including high quality coffee and near the ocean the subtropical climate suits citrus trees and sugar cane. Livestock and cereal crops are also produced there and stone of volcanic origin is quarried.

The Pacific coast offers beaches with tourist facilities. Other tourist destinations include the Salto de la Culebra Waterfall, and the Centro Ecoturístico La Máquina, a private nature reserve, both near Diriamba. The Museo Ecológico de Trópico Seco is a museum in Diriamba which has displays on the flora and fauna of the department.

== Wildlife Reserve Río Escalante-Chacocente ==
The Río Escalante-Chacocente Wildlife Reserve is situated near Santa Teresa and is one of the most important dry tropical reserves in Nicaragua. A half kilometre stretch of beach attracts large numbers of olive ridley sea turtles (Lepidochelys olivacea), known locally as paslama turtles. These come on land on several consecutive nights at certain phases of the moon between July and December to dig holes in the sand and lay their eggs. Park rangers are on hand to prevent the eggs being collected and sold locally for food. The incubation period is about 48 days and after that time, millions of juvenile turtles dig their way out of the nests and try to make their way down to the sea. Predatory birds engage in a feeding frenzy at this time, so to keep them safe, some of the eggs are transported to special nursery areas where the young turtles can be protected when they hatch. Other beaches in the park have Hawksbill sea turtles (Eretmochelys imbricata) and green sea turtles (Chelonia mydas) nesting.

The park is 4,645 hectares in area and has simple accommodation facilities in tents or at a hostel. Trails lead through the park and there are a wide variety of trees, flowering plants, birds and animals to be seen.

== Municipalities ==
1. Diriamba
2. Dolores
3. El Rosario
4. Jinotepe
5. La Conquista
6. La Paz de Carazo
7. San Marcos
8. Santa Teresa
