= Apoyo Lagoon Natural Reserve =

Nature reserve in Nicaragua

Coordinates: 11.922°N 86.029°W

Laguna de Apoyo Nature Reserve
- IUCN category IV (habitat/species management area)
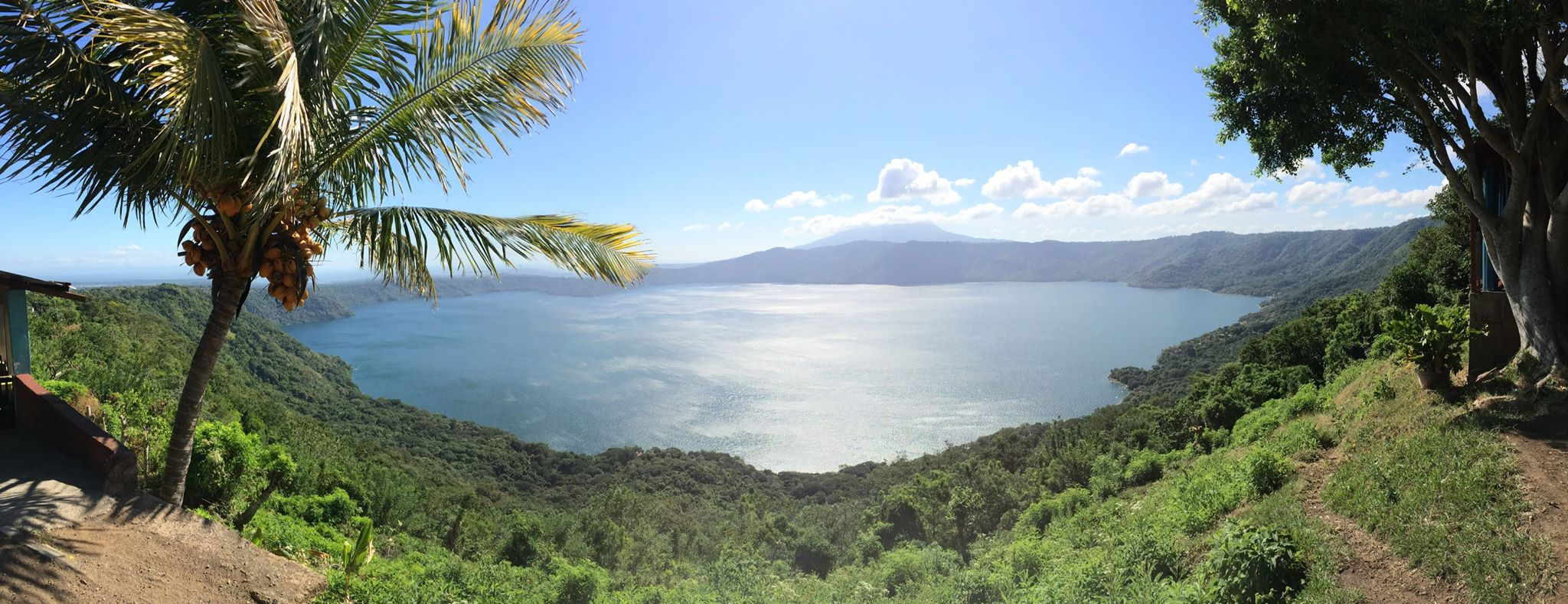
- View of Laguna de Apoyo from the crater rim
- Interactive map of Laguna de Apoyo Nature Reserve
- Location: between Masaya and Granada
- Nearest city: Masaya
- Area: 8,648 acres (35 km^{2})
- Governing body: Ministry of the Environment and Natural Resources (MARENA)

Laguna de Apoyo Nature Reserve (Spanish: Reserva Natural Laguna de Apoyo) is a nature reserve located between the departments of Masaya and Granada in Nicaragua. Lake Apoyo was declared a nature reserve in 1991 and is managed by the Ministry of the Environment and Natural Resources (MARENA) and comprises one of 78 protected areas of Nicaragua. Activities within the Laguna de Apoyo Nature Reserve are regulated by its management plan, approved in 2010, which prohibits the construction of housing within the reserve and use of motorized vehicles on the lake. Geological data suggests that Lake Apoyo originated about 23,000 years ago.

== Geography and hydrology ==
The Apoyo Lagoon Natural Reserve protects a volcanic lake, Laguna de Apoyo, and its drainage basin. Laguna de Apoyo is an endorheic lake occupying the caldera of an extinct volcano. The lake is approximately round with the diameter of 6.6 km. It is 175 m deep and occupies an area of 19.44 km^{2}. The lake's drainage basin occupies 38 km^{2}; influx and outflow of underground water plays a major role in the lake's water balance. According to Nicaraguan hydrologists, the lake's level dropped 10 m in some 30 years between 2002 and the mid-2000s.

== Flora and fauna ==
The reserve houses a tropical dry forest ecosystem, within the reserve the flora consists of over 500 species of plants and tropical dry trees, such as pochote, black rosewood, mahogany, hogplum and guacuco, as well as a large variety and amount of orchids. The fauna consists of mammals such as variegated squirrels, opossums, anteaters, pacas, jaguarundis, howler and white-faced capuchin monkeys. As well as a variety of reptiles such as green iguanas and common boas. Over 230 species of birds have been documented in the reserve, oropendolas, falcons, hummingbirds, and 65 species of migratory birds are present. Two-hundred twenty species of butterflies have been documented in the reserve, including 25 first records for Nicaragua and dozens of mollusks. Lake Apoyo also contains a variety of fish species, including six endemic species of cichlids in the genus Amphilophus. One of these species is the arrow cichlid (Amphilophus zaliosus), described in 1976. Three additional species were described in 2008, by the multinational research team directed by the Nicaraguan NGO, FUNDECI/GAIA, which manages a research station on the shore of the lake. The remaining two cichlids were only described in 2010. In addition to the endemics, three cichlids (Parachromis managuense, Oreochromis aureus, and O. niloticus) are found in the lake, but these were introduced by humans.

== Tourism ==
Lake Apoyo attracts tourists with various tourist attractions such as dark sand beaches for swimming, kayaking, hiking, scuba diving, birdwatching, paragliding, boating, and nature. Pumice rocks abound in the lagoon, and are harvested by locals for use in the clothing industry. Recently, petroglyphs and artifacts of indigenous peoples have been found in the reserve. Strict laws limiting human activity exist in the reserve, and several residential construction projects have been stopped and many landowners have been engaged in legal processes by the Ministry of Natural Resources inside the reserve, in accordance with the laws regarding nature reserves in Nicaragua.

== See also ==
- Tourism in Nicaragua
- Pyrgophorus coronatus found in the crater lake
