= Granada Department =

Department of Nicaragua

Coordinates: 11°56′N 85°57′W

Granada Departamento de Granada
- Department
- Flag Coat of arms

- Country: Nicaragua
- Capital: Granada

Area
  - Total: 1,040 km^{2} (400 sq mi)

Population (2023 estimate)
  - Total: 219,244
  - Density: 211/km^{2} (546/sq mi)
- ISO 3166-2: NI-GR

Granada is an administrative division and department in northwestern Nicaragua. The city of Granada serves as the capital of the department. It is spread over an area of 1,040 km^{2} (400 sq mi) and had a population of 219,244 inhabitants in 2023.

== History ==
The city of Granada was founded in 1524 by Francisco Hernández de Córdoba after the Spanish city of Granada and is one of the oldest Spanish established settlements in the Americas. It was subject to several pirate attacks between the 17th and 19th centuries, and was completely destroyed by William Walker during the civil war in 1854. After the war, it was reconstructed and the region developed a blend of colonial and neoclassical architecture. In the 19th century, before the construction of the Panama Canal, it served as part a "Transit Route", a canal route between the Atlantic and Pacific oceans.

== Geography ==
Granada is one of the fifteen departments of Nicaragua. It is spread over an area of 1,040 km^{2} (400 sq mi). Its capital, Granada, is situated 45 km (28 mi) southeast from the city of Managua, the capital of Nicaragua. Situated on the coast of Lake Nicaragua, it has several lakes, volcanoes, lagoons, beaches, and islands, several of which form part of protected areas such as national parks and reserves. The Masaya Volcano and the associated national park established in 1979, forms part of the district.

The department incorporates four municipalities–Diriá, Diriomo, Granada, and Nandaime. The city of Granada is a major commercial, cultural and transport hub. The historic city centre is spread over 105 hectares (260 acres) and incorporates 376 buildings of architectural value, and forms part of a protected area.

== Demographics ==
As per 2023 estimate, Granada department has a population of 219,244 inhabitants.
