= El Ceibo Museums =

Archaeological museum in Ometepe, Nicaragua

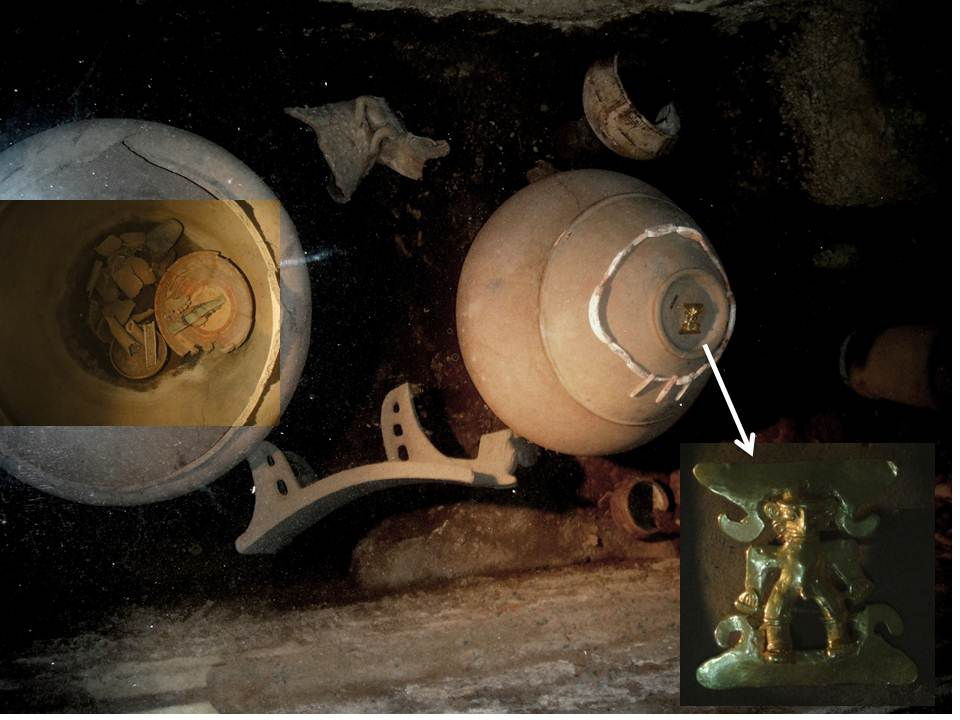
Burial display, El Ceibo Museum (Archaeology section), Ometepe, Nicaragua

El Ceibo is a museum in the Ometepe island in what once were the tobacco farm “Tel Aviv” kilns, known by its former name “El Refugio”, in the community of Sacramento, 10 kilometers from Moyogalpa in Lake Cocibolca or Lake Nicaragua administratively Ometepe Island belongs to the Rivas Department. The name of the island derives from the Nahuatl: ōme 'two' and tepētl 'mountain (s),' since it is almost entirely composed of two volcanic cones: Concepción (volcano) and Maderas volcano.

Access to the museum is free to island residents and has an entrance fee of US$10 for foreign tourists to visit both museums and US$6 for domestic visitors.

The museum requires multilateral support to increase the exhibition area as well as scientific research on many pieces, to enhance information about the articles and to support scientific studies of the important archaeological area.

Due to the absence of outside interest, its own privately generated revenue is insufficient for its continued maintenance and operation into the distant future.

== Museum history ==
The museum has two specific sections in two separate buildings; one is the Nicaraguan Numismatics, and another about pre-Hispanic archaeology of the area.

The archaeology exhibition area has six exhibition halls over 200 square meters, a two-storey exhibition, the only one equipped with air conditioning to preserve the archaeological exhibits.

The museum was founded in 2007 by Moises David Ghitis Rivera, a Nicaraguan philanthropist, on his agricultural and cattle farm on the island of Ometepe. It is the only private pre-Hispanic museum in the island of Ometepe, with a collection of more than 1500 archaeological pieces, which are on permanent display.

== Pre-Hispanic Archaeology Museum ==
On the first floor of the museum is the Ceramic Hall, displaying urns, metates (grindstones) and stone tools.

On the second floor of the museum there is the women representation, the Pottery Hall, varieties and body ornaments room; the 1,500 pieces on display there have been found throughout the island by different farmers, and others were held privately as families heritage which was donated to the museum.

=== Petroglyphs ===
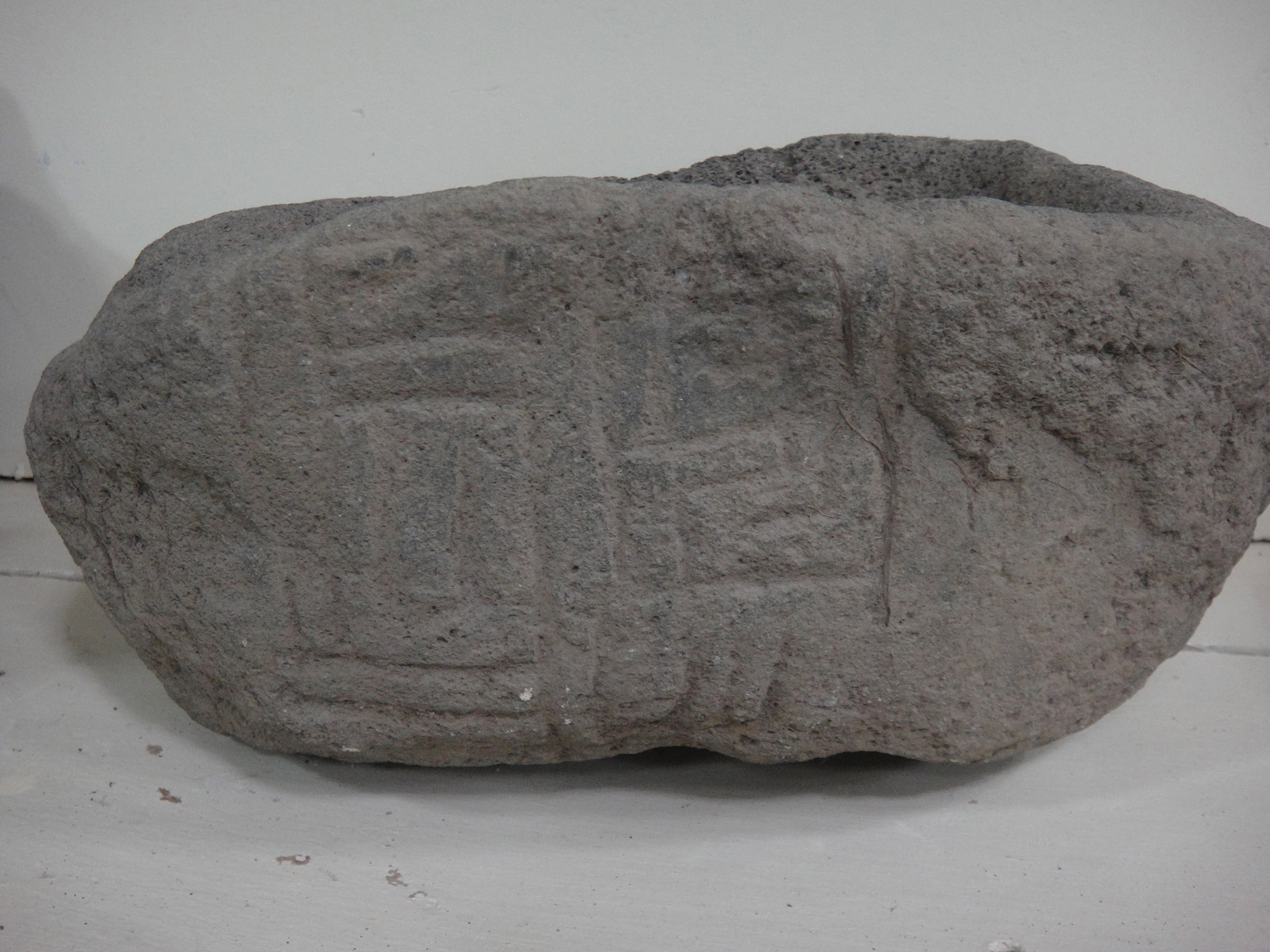
Petroglyph, El Ceibo Museum, Ometepe, Nicaragua

The outer courtyard of the museum displays 16 petroglyphs specimens, found in the area, 13 of which were found in the Maderas volcano, two on the museum grounds owned by Moses Ghitis and 1 is of unknown origin.

The island has many petroglyphs some dated as early as 300 BCE.

=== Ancient native tomb ===
Upon entering the museum, in the First Hall, there is a display of the recreation of a pre-Hispanic tomb; it was found and studied 15 years ago by Ghitis Rivera, 700 meters from the museum now. During the recovery process, it was mapped identifying location of human remains and the artifacts contained.

The pre-Hispanic tomb was reconstructed within the museum; it contains teeth, bones placed in a ceramic vase, a jade pendant, an animal teeth necklace, an eagle head tripod and a gold shaman, hence it is inferred that the remains belong to a very important person of Ometepe ancestors.

The origin of the gold Ometepe article opens an interesting topic of research, regarding its origin, meaning, etc.

=== Oldest pieces of the collection ===
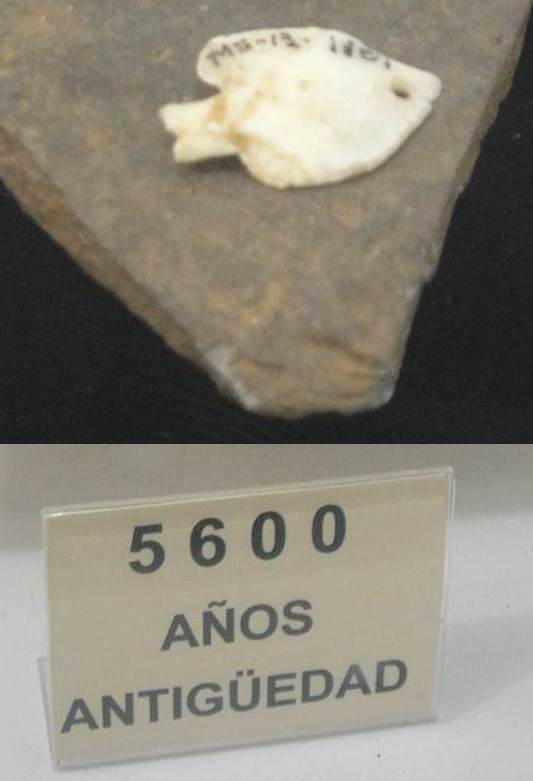
Flint Spearhead, 5,600 years old, El Ceibo Museum, Ometepe, Nicaragua

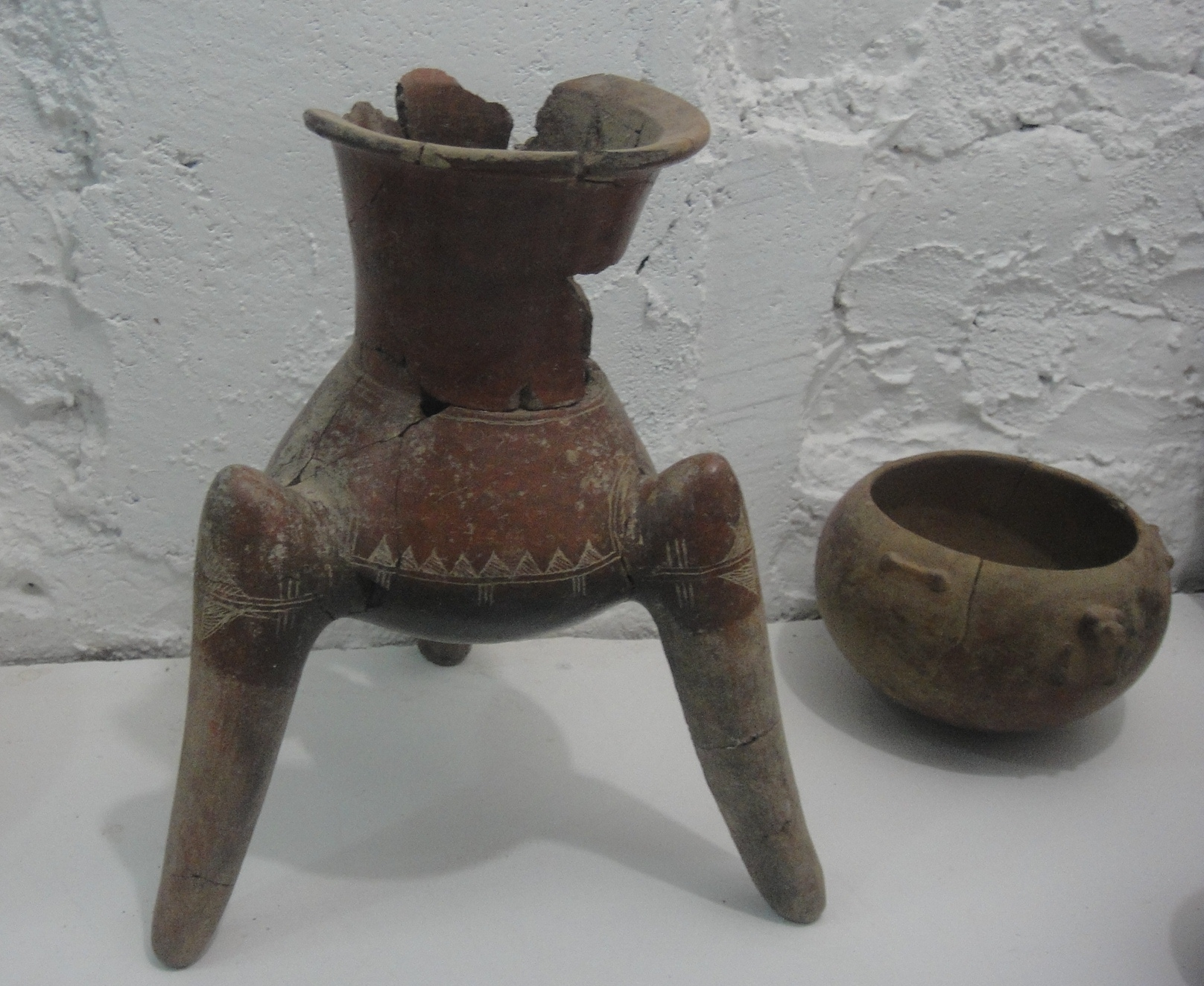
Ceramic Tripod, 2,800 years old, El Ceibo Museum, Ometepe, Nicaragua

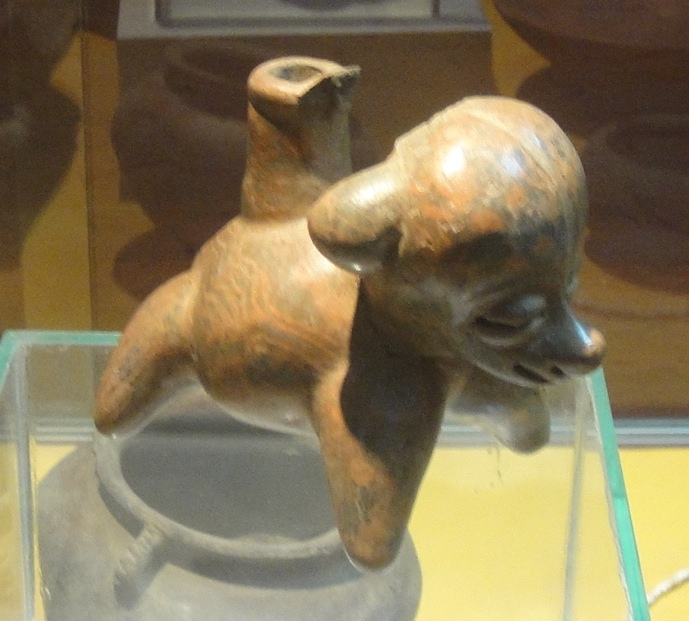
Xulo Dog, 2,800 years old, El Ceibo Museum, Ometepe, Nicaragua. Dogs were important to natives, as they fed and ate them.

=== Ancient trade ===
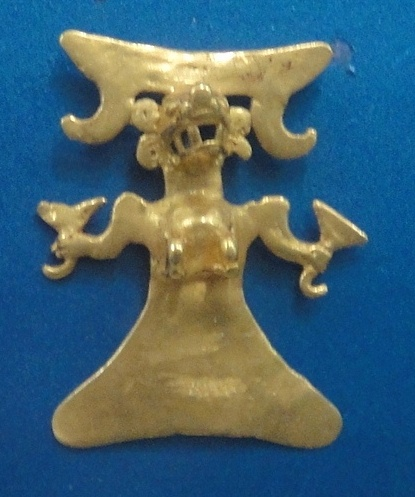
Gold Ornament, El Ceibo Museum, Ometepe, Nicaragua

The collection of this Museum offers important evidence of trade that existed in the region in prehispanic times since the presence of various items indicate relationships with other regions such as El Salvador and Honduras, pieces were found that originated in these countries and presumably gold pieces from Colombia. Other pieces found have distinctive Maya, Inca, and Aztec influences.

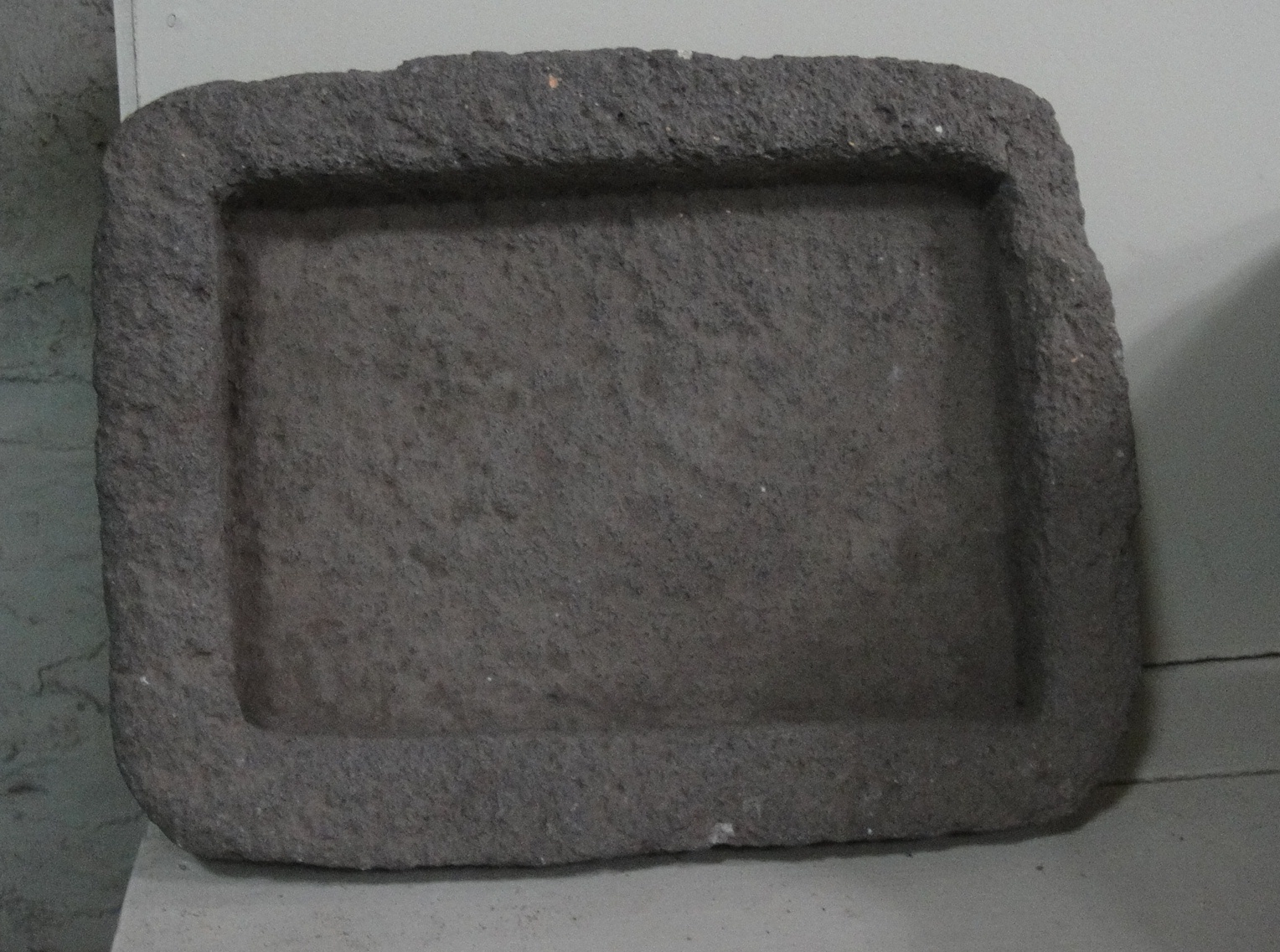
Square Stone Vessel, El Ceibo Museum, Ometepe, Nicaragua

== Exhibition halls ==
The following is a brief description of the various halls and its contents.

=== Tools ===
This hall exhibits different types of tools that were manufactured and used by our ancestors, as follows:

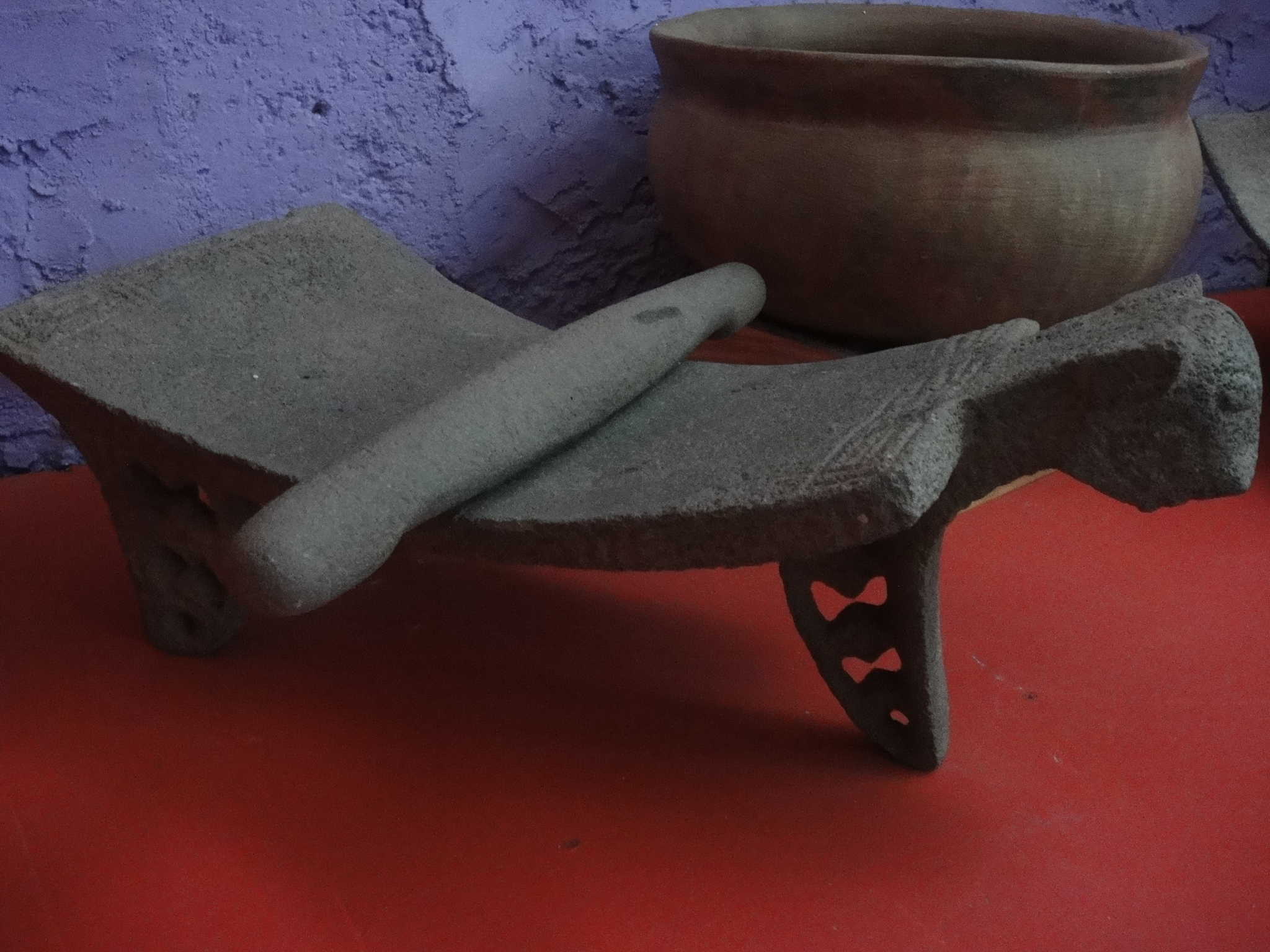
Beautiful Metate, El Ceibo Museum, Ometepe, Nicaragua

- Mallets
- Flint Stone and obsidian Arrow tips and spearheads
- Farming tools
- Kitchen utensils
- Weighs for fishing nets
- Petroglyphs
- Grinding stones or metates, three supports, 4 supports, unsupported, curved, table type, flat, with feline heads, etc. (The museum has over 50 of these pieces).

=== Funerary urn hall ===
This hall exhibits different types of funeral urns, manufactured and used by prehispanic natives, as follows:

Urn Shoe Type Urn Round Type Urn Vessel Type

=== Ceramic hall – Orosi Phase 3000 - 500 BCE ===
During this period, ceramic manufactured was monochromatic or a single tonality, color inks were not used.

=== Ceramic hall - Tempisque Phase 500 - 300 BCE ===
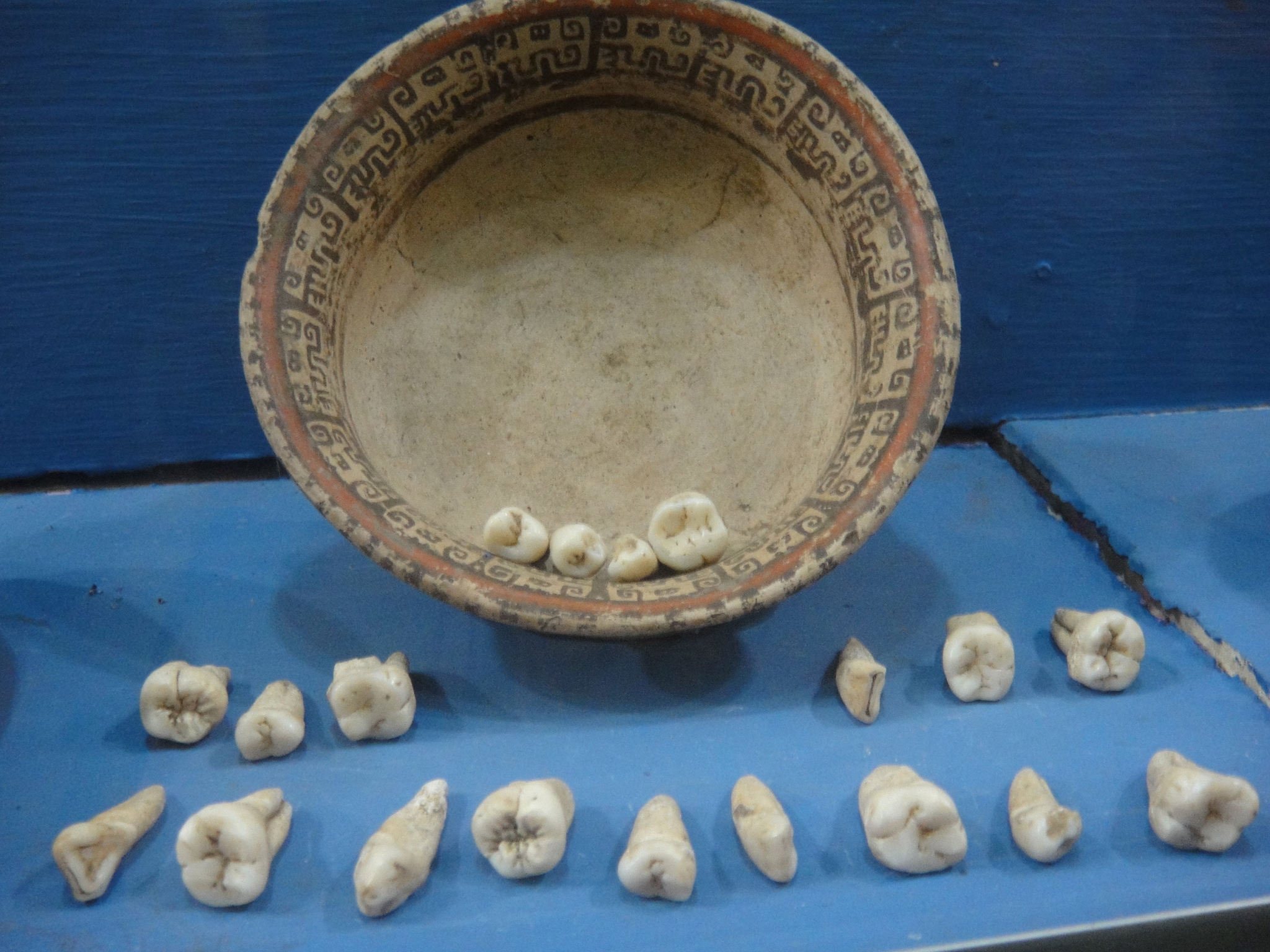
Ceramic & Teeth, El Ceibo Museum, Ometepe, Nicaragua

During this period begins to develop bi-chrome ceramics, Slipped-Incised and monochrome.

=== Ceramic Hall – Bagaces Phase 300 - 800 CE ===
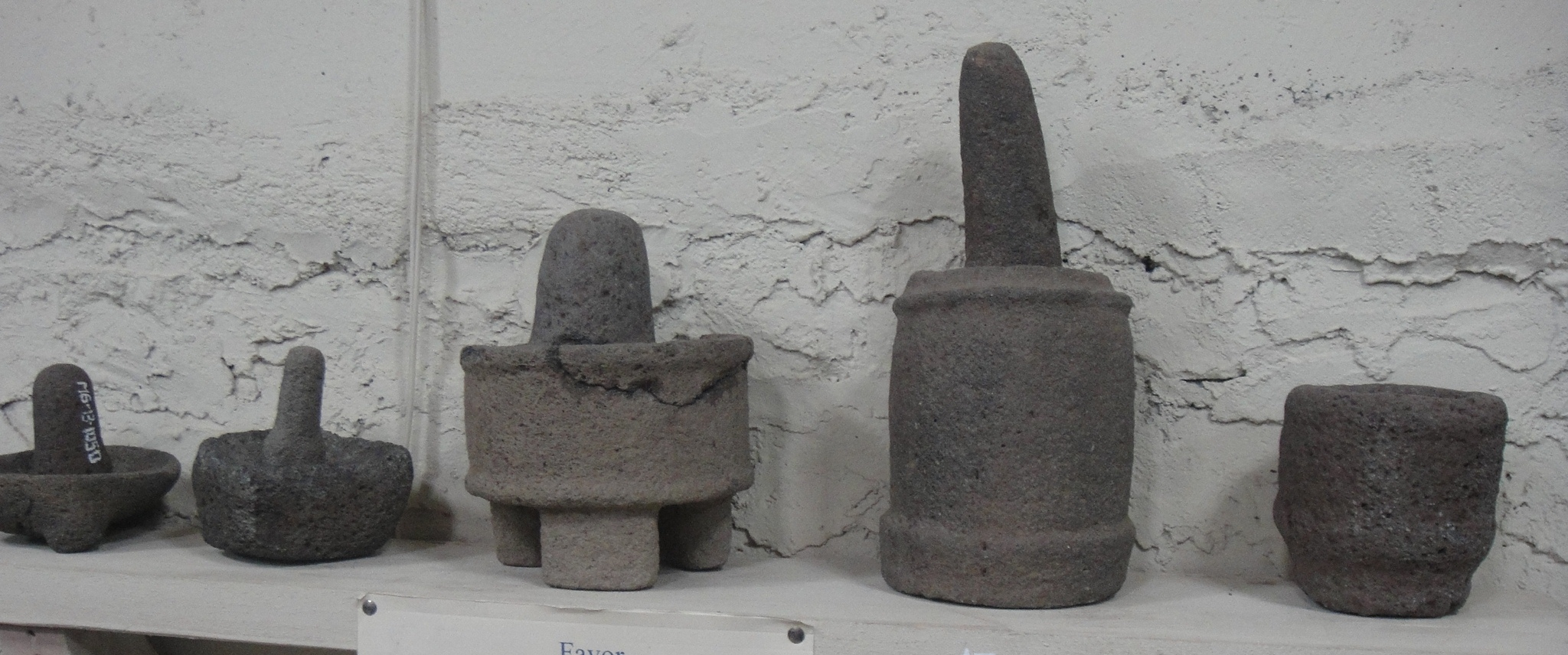
Mortars, El Ceibo Museum, Ometepe, Nicaragua

This period already manufactures ancient polychrome ceramics, tri-chrome ceramic: red, black and beige.

=== Ceramic Hall – Sapoá Phase 800 – 1350 CE ===
This period manufactures medium polychrome ceramic and Papagayo ceramics.

=== Ceramic Hall - Ometepe Phase 1350 - 1550 CE ===
During this period late polychrome ceramics, Luna ceramic, Castillo Sgraffito, and black side.

== Acknowledgments ==
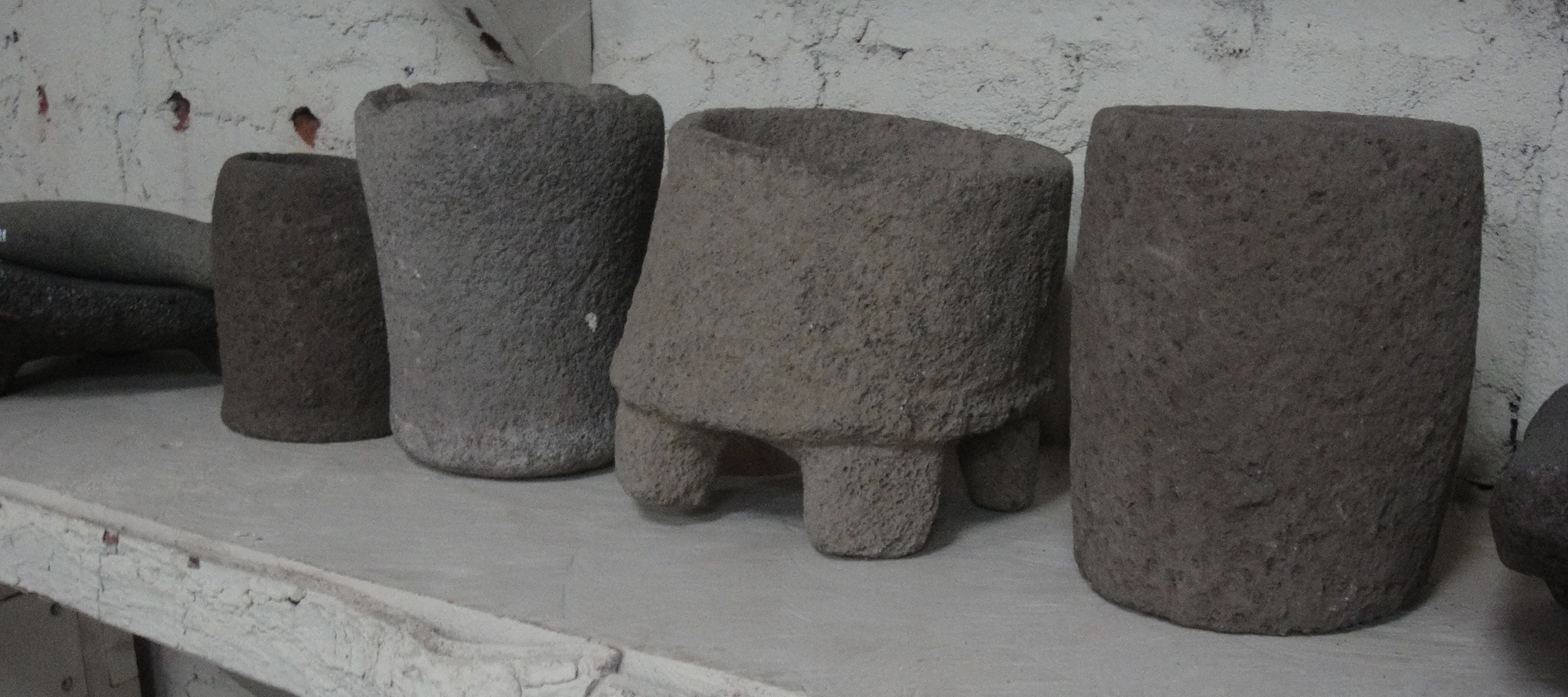
Stone Jars, El Ceibo Museum, Ometepe, Nicaragua

The museum and its board of directors recognize the following institutions that in some fashion have supported the important Museum Mission:

- Nicaraguan Culture Minister.
- Nicaraguan Tourism Institute.
- ETEA Foundation, for development and cooperation, from Rivas.

== Research project ==
The museum intends to perform a scientific study on the existing heritage and research in specific areas in order to investigate the origins of the civilizations that inhabited the island, as well as probable dates for the different occupation periods, with the help of friends and archaeologists of the museum and Nicaraguan Culture Ministry.
