= Bolitoglossa insularis =

Conservation status
- Critically Endangered (IUCN 3.1)

Scientific classification
- Kingdom: Animalia
- Phylum: Chordata
- Class: Amphibia
- Order: Urodela
- Family: Plethodontidae
- Genus: Bolitoglossa
- Species: B. insularis

Binomial name
- Bolitoglossa insularis Sunyer et al., 2008

Species of salamander

Bolitoglossa insularis, the Ometepe mushroomtongue salamander, is a species of salamander in the family Plethodontidae. It is a fairly large salamander for its genus, with females growing to a snout–vent length of 64.7 mm (2.55 in). The back, head, and tail are brown with many dark brown flecks or uniformly yellowish to brownish. The underside is pale grayish-brown with dark brown flecking or uniform, unmarked white. The salamander is endemic to Nicaragua, where it is found only on the Maderas Volcano Natural Reserve on the island of Ometepe in Lake Nicaragua. It is classified as being critically endangered by the IUCN and is threatened primarily by habitat degradation.

== Taxonomy ==
Bolitoglossa insularis was formally described in 2008 based on an adult female specimen collected from the Maderas Volcano Natural Reserve on the island of Ometepe in Lake Nicaragua, in 2007. The specific epithet is derived from a Latin word meaning 'of islands', referring to the species' island-restricted range. The species has the English common name Ometepe mushroomtongue salamander.

It is placed within the subgenus Bolitoglossa.

== Description ==
Bolitoglossa insularis is a fairly large salamander for its genus, with females growing to a snout–vent length of 64.7 mm (2.55 in). The back, head, and tail are brown with many dark brown flecks or uniformly yellowish to brownish. The underside is pale grayish-brown with dark brown flecking or uniform, unmarked white. The underside of the head is reddish-brown. The limbs are dark brown above and pale brown below, with uniform brown hands and feet.

== Distribution and habitat ==
Bolitoglossa insularis is found in Nicaragua, where it is found only on the Maderas Volcano Natural Reserve on the island of Ometepe, in the Rivas Department. It has been observed on bushes and ferns a few meters above the ground in humid premontane forest. It is known from elevations of 800–1,394 m (2,625–4,573 ft), but likely occurs even higher up on the volcano.

== Conservation ==
Bolitoglossa insularis is classified as being critically endangered by the IUCN due to its extremely small range, which is facing ongoing habitat degradation due to deforestation and climate change. It is also threatened by the spread of chytridiomycosis and ranavirus on Ometepe.
