= Ometepe Airport =

Ometepe Airport La Paloma Airport
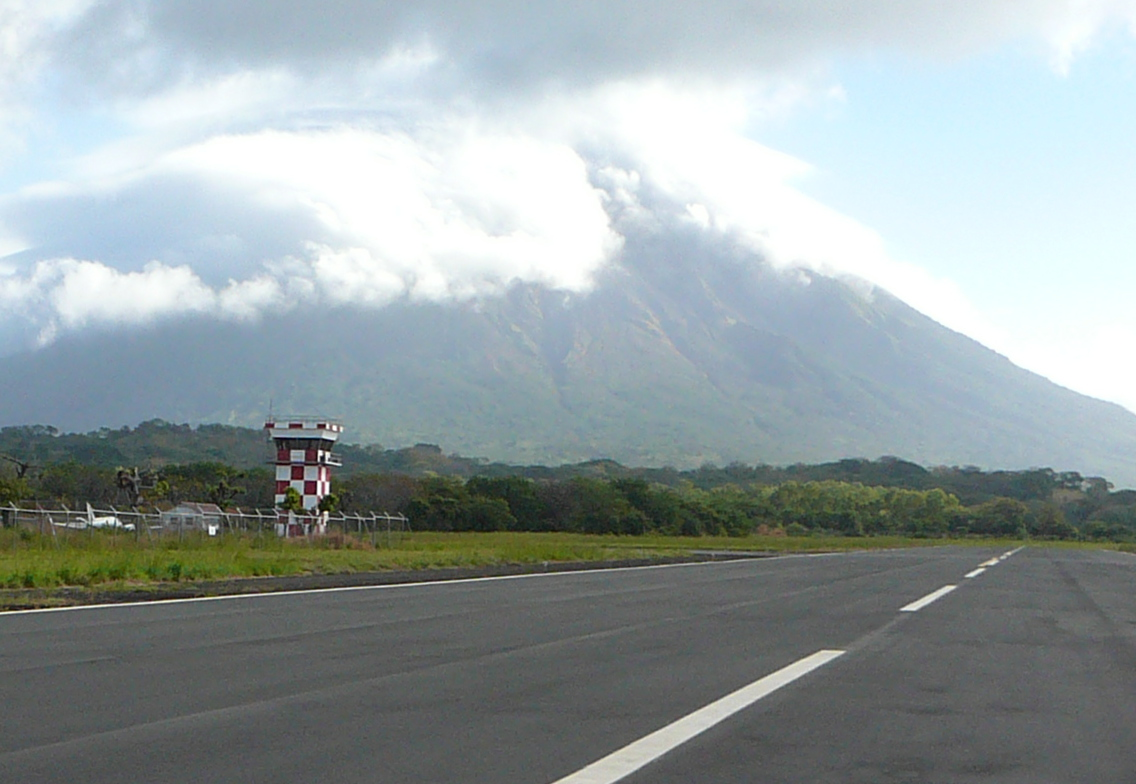
- Runway and control tower, with the Concepción volcano in the background
- IATA: none; ICAO: MNLP

Summary
- Airport type: Public
- Owner/Operator: INAC
- Serves: Moyogalpa, Nicaragua
- Elevation AMSL: 213 ft / 65 m
- Coordinates: 11°31′25″N 85°42′05″W
- Website: EAAI Ometepe

Map
- Location of the airport in Nicaragua

Runways
Direction	Length		Surface
Direction	m	ft	Surface
09/27	1,500	4,921	Asphalt
- Source: GCM Google Maps

Ometepe Airport (Spanish: Aeropuerto La Paloma de Ometepe (OMT)) (ICAO: MNLP) is the only airport on Ometepe, the largest island in Lake Nicaragua. The airport is in the La Paloma comarca of Moyogalpa, Rivas Department, Nicaragua, 1.6 kilometres (1 mi) south of Moyogalpa.

The airport was built in May of 2014 at a cost of almost US$17,000,000.

The runway begins at the shoreline, and west approaches and departures are over the water. The volcanic slopes of Concepción volcano begin 5 kilometres (3 mi) east of the runway.

The Managua VOR-DME (Ident: MGA) is located 45.6 nautical miles (84 km) northwest of Ometepe Airport. The Liberia VOR-DME is located 56.3 nautical miles (104 km) south of the airport.

== See also ==
- Transport in Nicaragua
- List of airports in Nicaragua
