= List of sister cities in Washington =

This is a list of sister cities in the United States state of Washington. Sister cities, known in Europe as town twins, are cities which partner with each other to promote human contact and cultural links, although this partnering is not limited to cities and often includes counties, regions, states and other sub-national entities.

Many Washington jurisdictions work with foreign cities through Sister Cities International, an organization whose goal is to "promote peace through mutual respect, understanding, and cooperation."

== A ==
Anacortes

- Lomonosov, Russia
- Nikaho, Japan
- Sidney, Canada
- Vela Luka, Croatia

Auburn

- Guanghan, China
- Mola di Bari, Italy
- Pyeongchang, South Korea
- Tamba, Japan
- Yuhang (Hangzhou), China

== B ==
Bainbridge Island

- Altagracia, Nicaragua
- Moyogalpa, Nicaragua

Bellevue

- Hualien, Taiwan
- Kladno, Czech Republic
- Liepāja, Latvia
- Yao, Japan

Bellingham

- Cheongju, South Korea
- Nakhodka, Russia
- Port Stephens, Australia
- Punta Arenas, Chile
- Tateyama, Japan
- Tsetserleg, Mongolia
- Vaasa, Finland

Bremerton

- Kure, Japan

== C ==
Camas

- Hamamatsu, Japan
- Krapkowice, Poland
- Morawica, Poland
- Taki, Japan
- Zabierzów, Poland

Chehalis

- Hamamatsu, Japan

Chelan

- Katō, Japan

Covington

- Tatsuno, Japan

== E ==
East Wenatchee

- Misawa, Japan

Edmonds

- Hekinan, Japan

Everett

- Iwakuni, Japan
- (Republic of Ireland) Sligo, Ireland
- Sovetskaya Gavan, Russia

== F ==
Federal Way

- Donghae, South Korea
- Hachinohe, Japan

Ferndale

- Minamibōsō, Japan

== I ==
Issaquah

- Chefchaouen, Morocco
- Sunndal, Norway

== K ==
Kelso

- Kelso, Scotland, United Kingdom
- Makinohara, Japan

Kennewick

- Taoyuan, Taiwan

Kent

- Lutsk, Ukraine
- Sunnfjord, Norway
- Tamba, Japan
- Yangzhou, China

== L ==
La Conner

- Olga, Russia

Lacey

- Mińsk Mazowiecki, Poland

Lakewood

- Bauang, Philippines
- Gimhae, South Korea
- Okinawa, Japan

Longview

- Wakō, Japan

Lynnwood

- Damyang, South Korea

== M ==
Mercer Island

- Thonon-les-Bains, France

Moses Lake

- Yonezawa, Japan

Mount Vernon

- Chilliwack, Canada
- Matsushige, Japan

== O ==
Olympia

- Katō, Japan
- Nanchang, China

Othello

- Wulensi, Ghana

== P ==
Point Roberts

- Campobello Island, Canada

Port Angeles

- Mutsu, Japan

Port Townsend

- Ichikawa, Japan
- Sooke, Canada

Pullman

- Kasai, Japan

== R ==
Renton

- Cuautla, Mexico
- Nishiwaki, Japan

Richland

- Hsinchu, Taiwan

== S ==
Seattle

- Beersheba, Israel
- Bergen, Norway
- Cebu, Philippines
- Chongqing, China
- Christchurch, New Zealand
- Daejeon, South Korea
- (Republic of Ireland) Galway, Ireland
- Gdynia, Poland
- Haiphong, Vietnam
- Kaohsiung, Taiwan
- Kobe, Japan
- Limbe, Cameroon
- Mombasa, Kenya
- Nantes, France
- Pécs, Hungary
- Perugia, Italy
- Reykjavík, Iceland
- Sihanoukville, Cambodia
- Surabaya, Indonesia
- Tashkent, Uzbekistan

Sequim

- Shisō, Japan

Shoreline

- Boryeong, South Korea

Snoqualmie

- Chaclacayo, Peru
- Gangjin, South Korea

Spokane

- Cagli, Italy
- Jecheon, South Korea
- Jilin City, China
- (Republic of Ireland) Limerick, Ireland
- Nishinomiya, Japan

== T ==
Tacoma

- Ålesund, Norway
- Biot, France
- Boca del Río, Mexico
- Brovary, Ukraine
- Cienfuegos, Cuba
- Davao City, Philippines
- Fuzhou, China
- George, South Africa
- Gunsan, South Korea
- Hvar, Croatia
- El Jadida, Morocco
- Kitakyushu, Japan
- Taichung, Taiwan
- Vladivostok, Russia

Tukwila

- Miyoshi, Japan

== V ==
Vancouver

- Jōyō, Japan

== W ==
Walla Walla

- Tamba-Sasayama, Japan

Washougal

- Zielonki, Poland

Wenatchee

- Misawa, Japan
- Naju, South Korea

== Y ==
Yakima

- Derbent, Russia
- Itayanagi, Japan
- Keelung, Taiwan
- Morelia, Mexico
