= Altagracia =

Altagracia Astagalpa
- Municipality
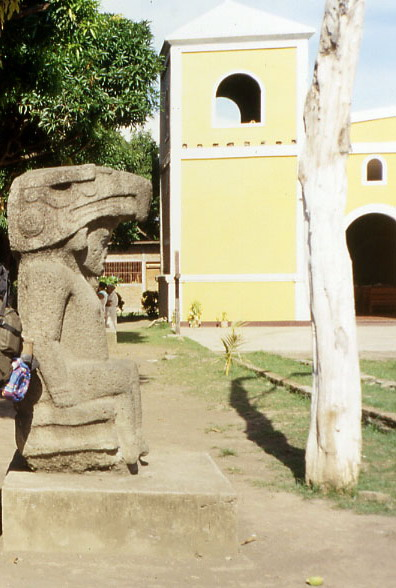
- Sculpture park next to the cathedral of Altagracia

- Location in Nicaragua
- Coordinates: 11°34′N 85°35′W
- Country: Nicaragua
- Department: Rivas Department

Area
  - Municipality: 81 sq mi (211 km^{2})

Population (2005)
  - Municipality: 19,955
  - Urban: 7,041

Altagracia (Spanish pronunciation: [altaˈɣɾasja]) is a municipality in the Rivas Department of Nicaragua.

It is the largest town on the island of Ometepe, above the town of Moyogalpa. Its original name was Astagalpa, meaning ‘house of the herons’ in Nahuatl. This city also has a ferry port, Puerto de Gracia, that services Granada and San Carlos near the Rio San Juan. However, due to seasonal water level fluctuations, this port and the nightly ferry crossings are often seasonally cancelled.

== History ==
Altagracia is home to a cathedral which was built in 1924. The city has recently installed a sculpture park next to the cathedral that contains important pre-Columbian art made from basalt rock. The figures are of great size, and represent human figures and their alter egos, mainly the eagle and jaguar.

Also present in Altagracia is the Museum of Ometepe (Museo de Ometepe) with a large archaeological and ethnographic collection.

== Tradition ==
The city patron is San Diego de Alcalá and his festival, Fiesta de San Diego, is celebrated from November 12–18. The traditional dance called baile del Zompopo is performed on the 17th of November. This tradition is mixed with the celebration of Xolotl, who inhabited Nicaragua in pre-Columbian times before the Spaniards arrived. When the Franciscan arrived in Ometepe in 1613, this tradition was already existent, although they brought with themselves an image of San Diego de Alcalá and with time they obtained his figure and replaced Xolotl.

== Gallery ==
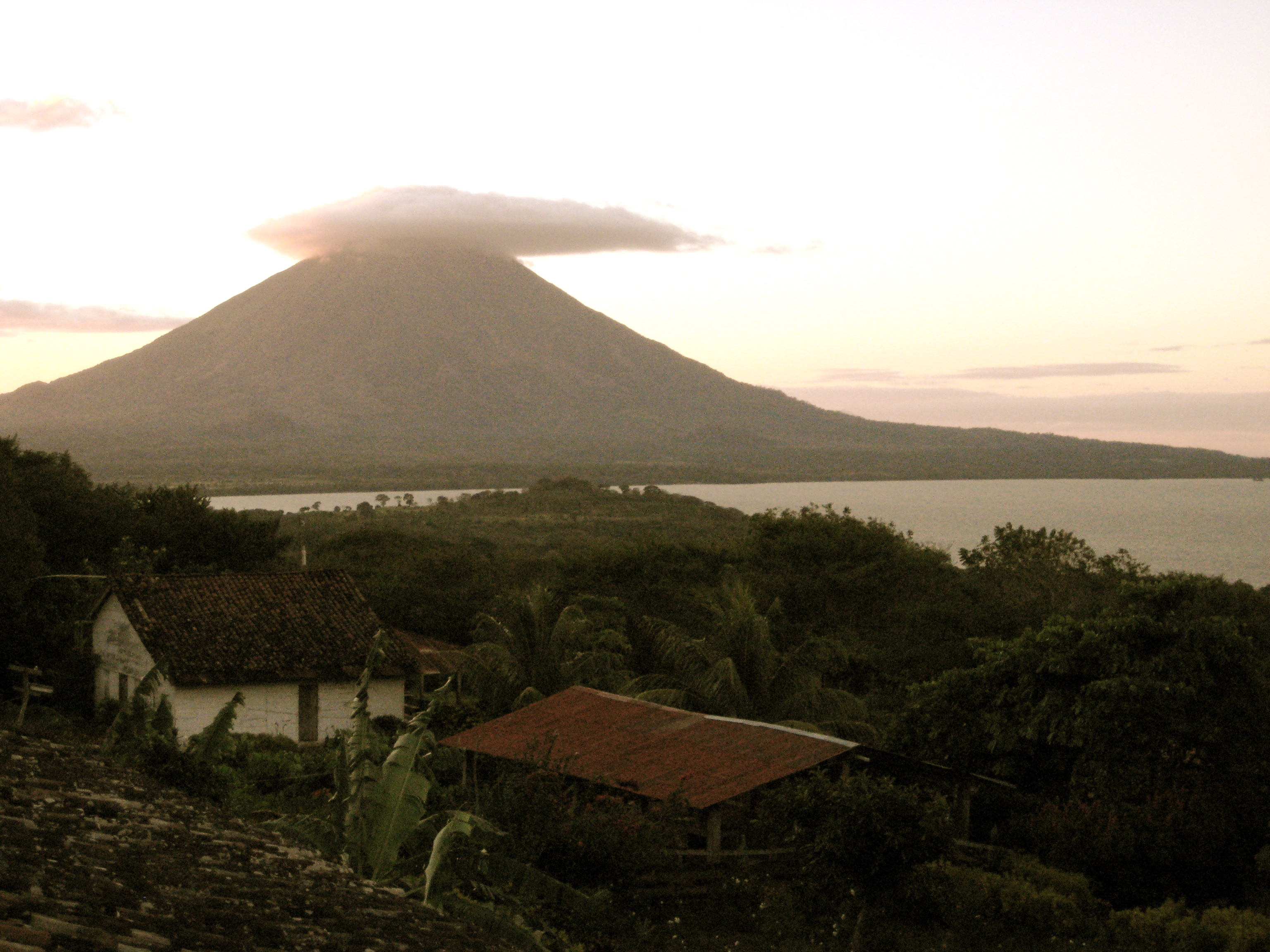
View from Finca Magdalena in Altagracia, Rivas. The Concepción volcano in the background.

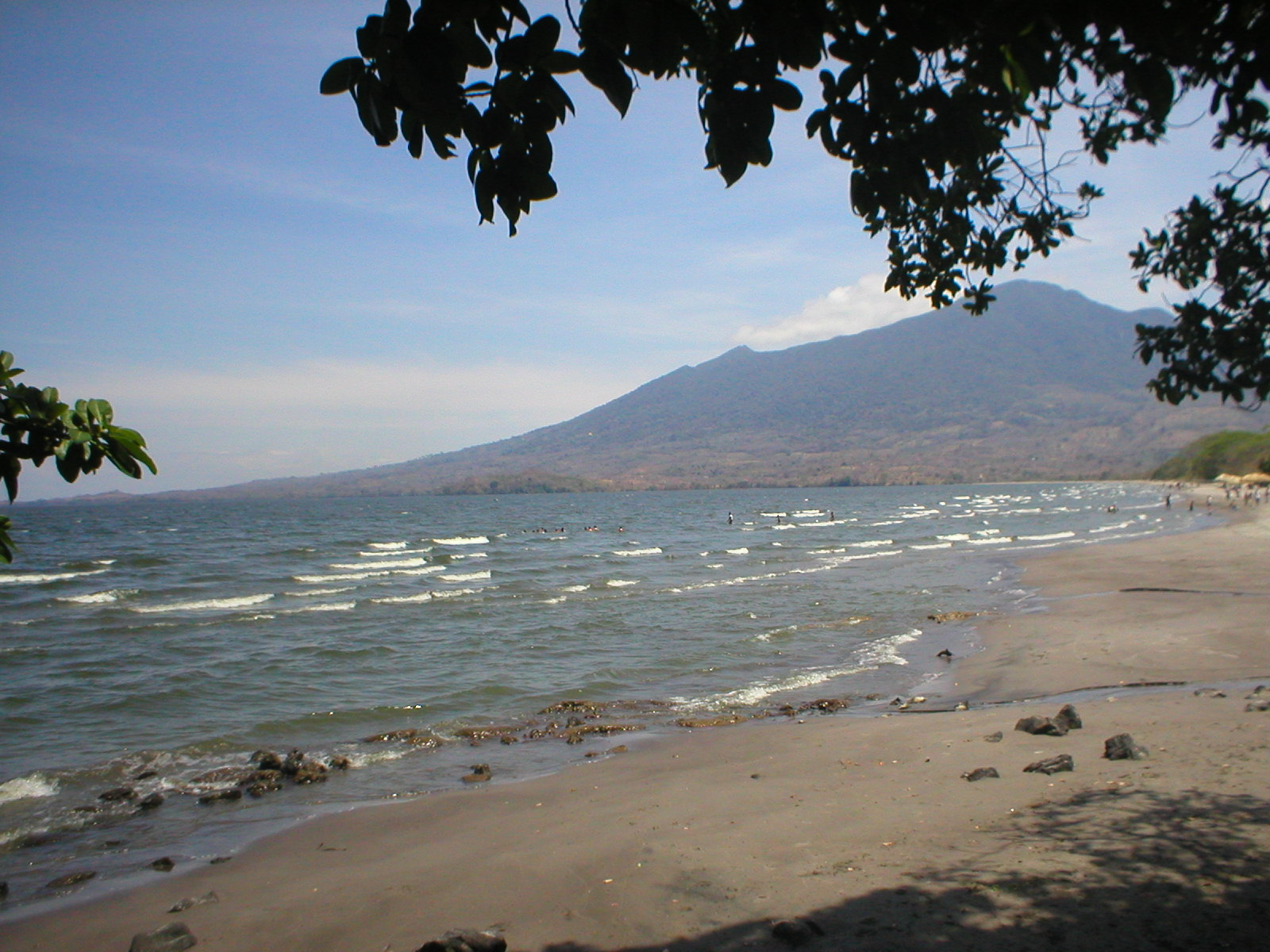
Playa Santo Domingo. The Maderas volcano in the background.

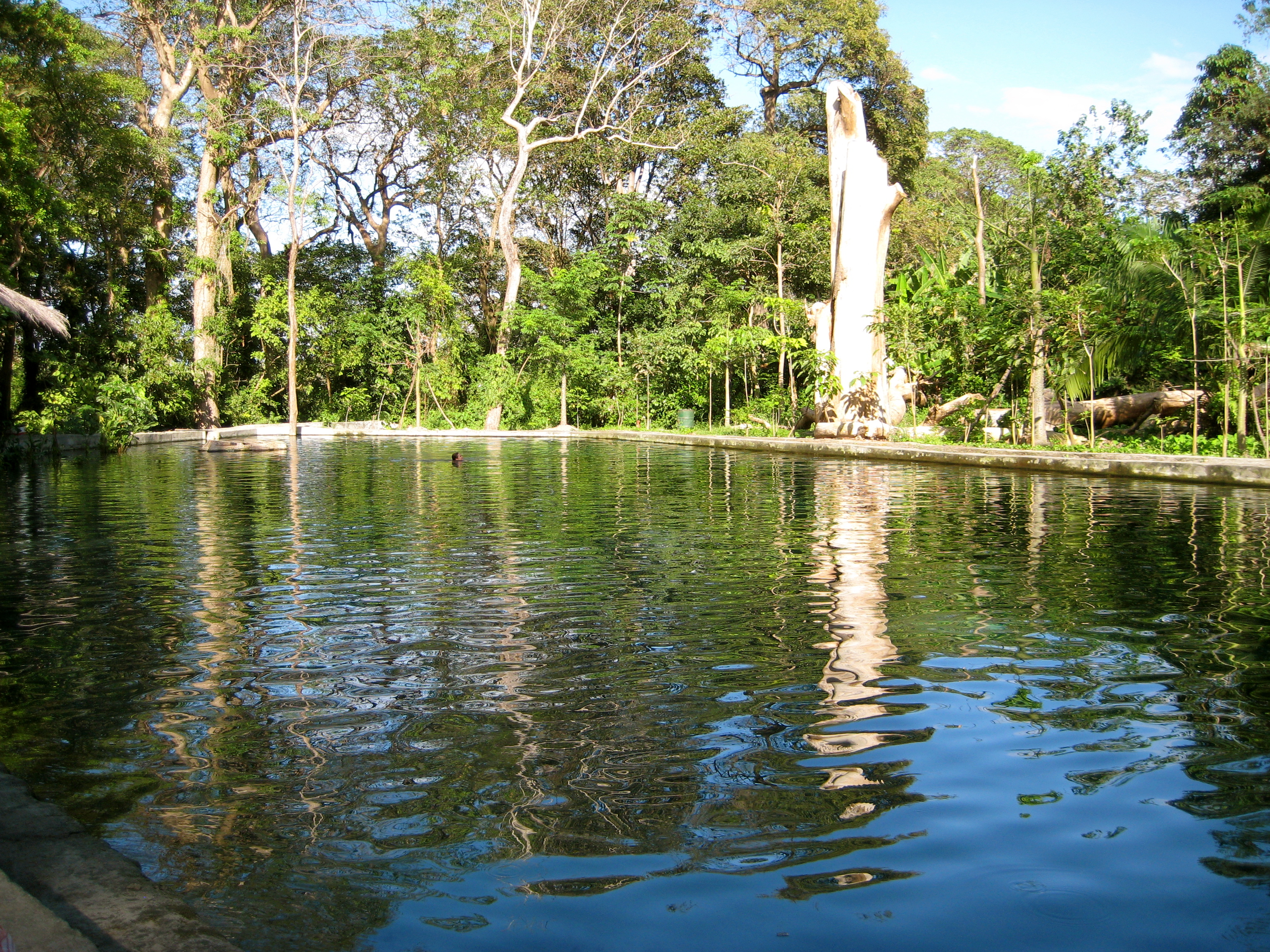
Ojo de Agua, Altagracia, in Ometepe Island.

== See also ==
- Ometepe
- Tourism in Nicaragua
