= Buenos Aires, Nicaragua =

Municipality in Rivas Department, Nicaragua

Buenos Aires
- Municipality
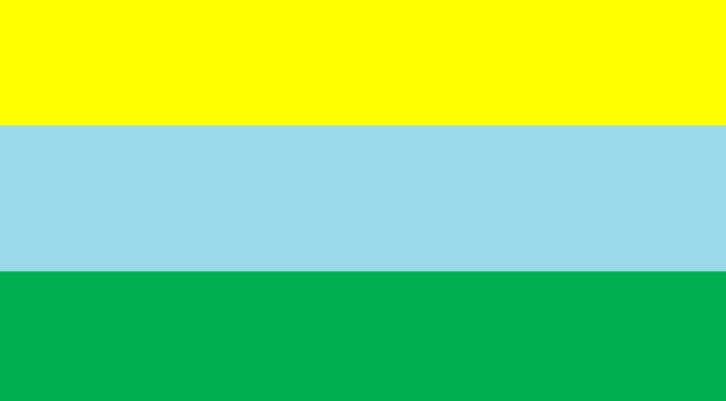
- Flag

- Location in Nicaragua
- Coordinates: 11°28′N 85°49′W
- Country: Nicaragua
- Department: Rivas Department

Area
  - Municipality: 29 sq mi (75 km^{2})

Population (2005)
  - Municipality: 5,420
  - Urban: 2,236

Buenos Aires is a municipality in the Rivas department of Nicaragua, located on the western shore of Lake Nicaragua.

== History ==
The municipality of Buenos Aires was founded as a pueblo sometime between 1820 and 1838.
