= Cárdenas, Nicaragua =

Cárdenas
- Municipality
- Location in Nicaragua
- Coordinates: 11°12′N 85°31′W
- Country: Nicaragua
- Department: Rivas Department

Area
  - Land: 88 sq mi (227 km^{2})

Population
  - Municipality: 6,990
  - Urban: 934

Cárdenas is a municipality in the Rivas department of Nicaragua, located on the southwestern shore of Lake Nicaragua.

In 2002, the municipality of Cárdenas had threatened the government in Managua with secession and becoming part of Costa Rica. Costa Rica claimed that it would respect Nicaraguan territory and had no intention of annexing the municipality.

== Climate ==
Climate data for Cárdenas, Nicaragua (1971–1990)
Month	Jan	Feb	Mar	Apr	May	Jun	Jul	Aug	Sep	Oct	Nov	Dec	Year
Mean daily maximum °C (°F)	27.8 (82.0)	28.8 (83.8)	30.6 (87.1)	31.5 (88.7)	31.4 (88.5)	29.6 (85.3)	28.9 (84.0)	29.1 (84.4)	29.3 (84.7)	29.1 (84.4)	28.6 (83.5)	27.9 (82.2)	29.4 (84.9)
Daily mean °C (°F)	25.2 (77.4)	25.8 (78.4)	26.9 (80.4)	27.5 (81.5)	27.3 (81.1)	26.6 (79.9)	26.3 (79.3)	26.4 (79.5)	26.3 (79.3)	26.2 (79.2)	26.0 (78.8)	25.5 (77.9)	26.3 (79.3)
Mean daily minimum °C (°F)	22.6 (72.7)	22.8 (73.0)	22.9 (73.2)	23.7 (74.7)	23.8 (74.8)	23.6 (74.5)	23.6 (74.5)	23.6 (74.5)	23.3 (73.9)	23.2 (73.8)	23.3 (73.9)	23.0 (73.4)	23.3 (73.9)
Average precipitation mm (inches)	40 (1.6)	19 (0.7)	18 (0.7)	41 (1.6)	153 (6.0)	345 (13.6)	303 (11.9)	257 (10.1)	351 (13.8)	340 (13.4)	184 (7.2)	70 (2.8)	2,121 (83.5)
Average precipitation days (≥ 1.0 mm)	8	4	3	4	13	21	20	19	21	21	14	12	160
Source: National Oceanic and Atmospheric Administration
