= Zapatera Archipelago =

Protected area in Nicaragua

Coordinates: 11.734°N 85.84°W

The Zapatera Archipelago is located in Lake Nicaragua, Nicaragua. It consists of the Zapatera Island (Isla Zapatera), Isla el Muerto and several other islets. The Zapatera Archipelago National Park is located there.
