= Concepción (volcano) =

Volcano in Nicaragua

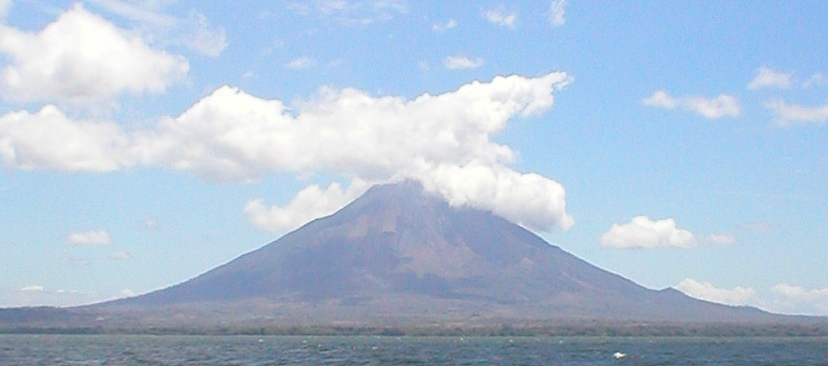

Highest point
- Elevation: 1,610 m (5,280 ft)
- Prominence: 1,579 m (5,180 ft)
- Listing: Ultra
- Coordinates: 11°32′16.8″N 85°37′19.2″W

Geography
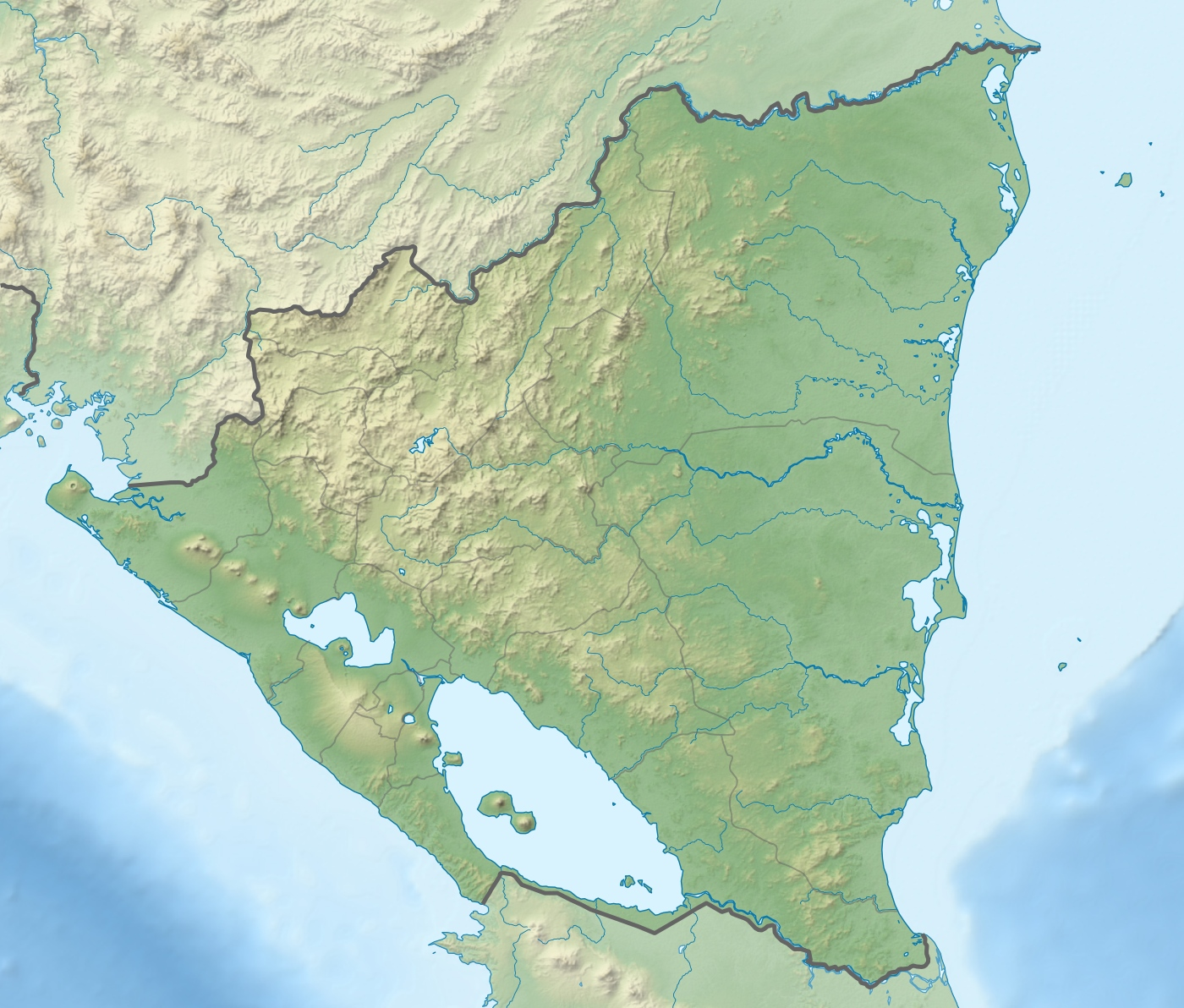
- Location within Nicaragua
- Location: Rivas Department, Nicaragua

Geology
- Mountain type: Stratovolcano
- Volcanic arc: Central America Volcanic Arc
- Last eruption: 2024

Concepción (Spanish: Volcán Concepción), also known by its aboriginal name Omeyatecihua from the Nawat language, is one of two volcanoes (along with Maderas) that form the island of Ometepe, which is situated in Lake Nicaragua in Nicaragua, Central America.

Concepción is an active stratovolcano that forms the northwest part of the Isla de Ometepe. Concepción is 1,610 m (5,280 ft) tall and rests on a 1-kilometer-thick (0.62 mi) thick base of Quaternary lacustrine mudstones. It is considered a "pristine" volcano because there has been no influence of other volcanoes on its growth, and its cone is highly symmetrical. The growth of the volcano comes in phases based on weaknesses of the crust that the volcano rests on. As it grows from additional magma flow, the volcano grows in mass and exerts pressure on the crust. This causes shifts which in turn cause more volcanic growth. This affects the magma chamber which begins the cycle again with growth because of magmatic flow.

Since 1883, Concepción has erupted at least 25 times; its last eruption was on 16 May 2024. Concepción's eruptions are characterized by frequent, moderate-sized explosions. Active fumaroles are present just north of Concepción's summit crater.

Adventure seekers from all over the world travel to Ometepe Island to climb Volcán Concepción. There are numerous trails in the tropical forest that surrounds the volcano's ash-covered peak.

== See also ==
- List of volcanoes in Nicaragua
