= San Jorge, Nicaragua =

San Jorge
- Municipality
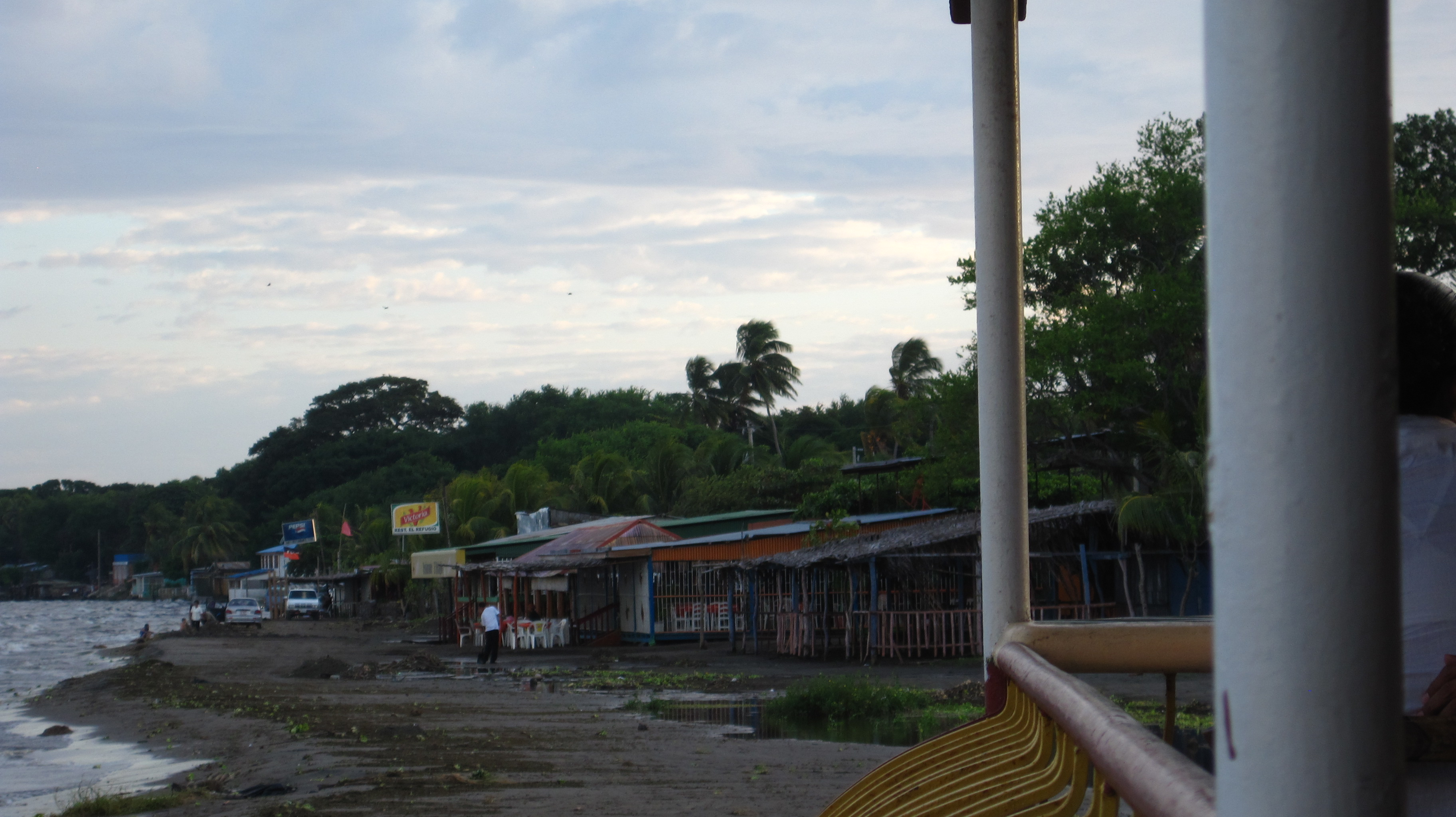
- Beach at San Jorge, Rivas

- Location in Nicaragua
- Coordinates: 11°27′N 85°48′W
- Country: Nicaragua
- Department: Rivas

Area
  - Municipality: 9.7 sq mi (25 km^{2})

Population (2005)
  - Municipality: 8,024
  - Density: 830/sq mi (320/km^{2})
  - Urban: 7,126

San Jorge is a municipality in the Rivas department of Nicaragua. It is located on Lake Nicaragua.
