= Maderas Volcano Natural Reserve =

Nature reserve in Nicaragua

Maderas Volcano Natural Reserve is a nature reserve in Nicaragua, was declared in 1993. It is one of the 78 reserves that are under official protection in the country.

The volcano covers an area of approximately 4,100 hectares, rises to an elevation of 1,394 meters above sea level, and has a maximum basal diameter of about 24 kilometers. Its last known eruption occurred more than eight centuries ago, and it is currently classified as extinct, as its crater is now occupied by a small lagoon.
