= Lake Nicaragua =

Largest lake in Central America

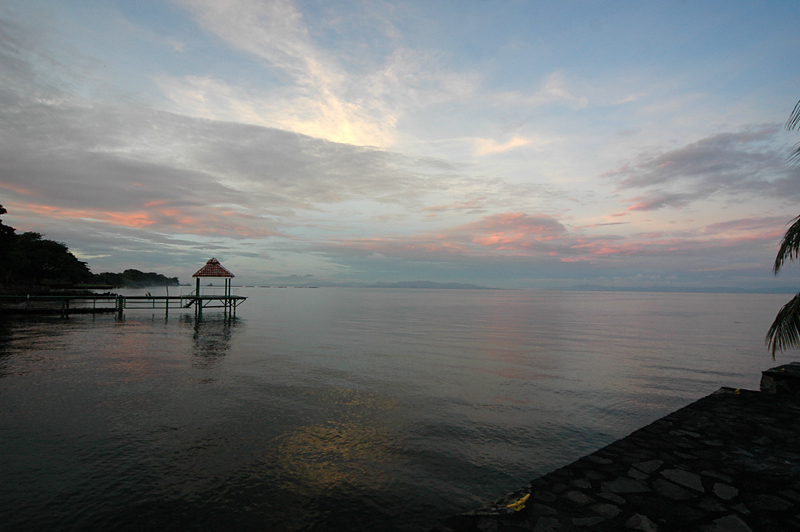
- Lake Nicaragua in June 2005

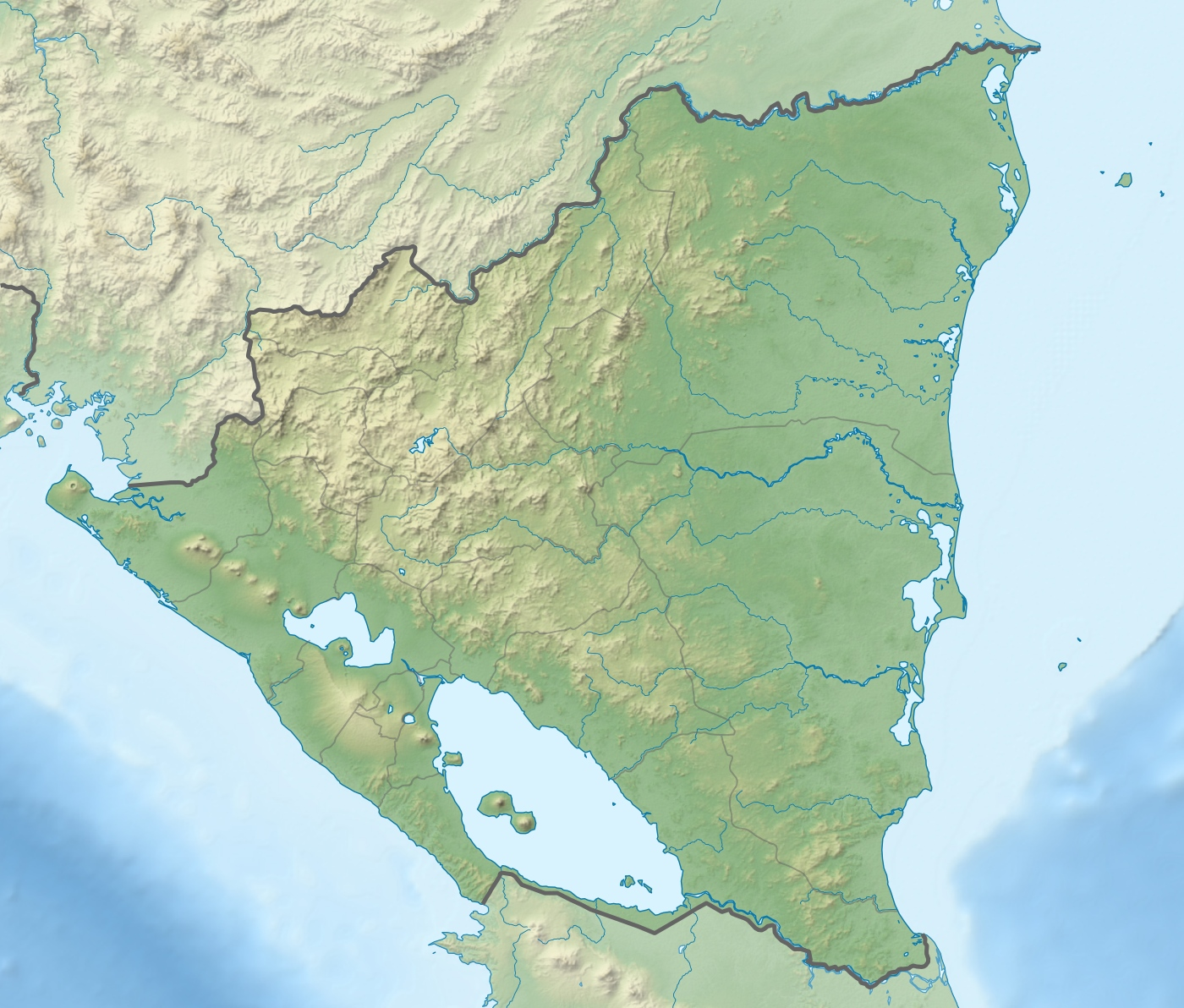
- Location within Nicaragua

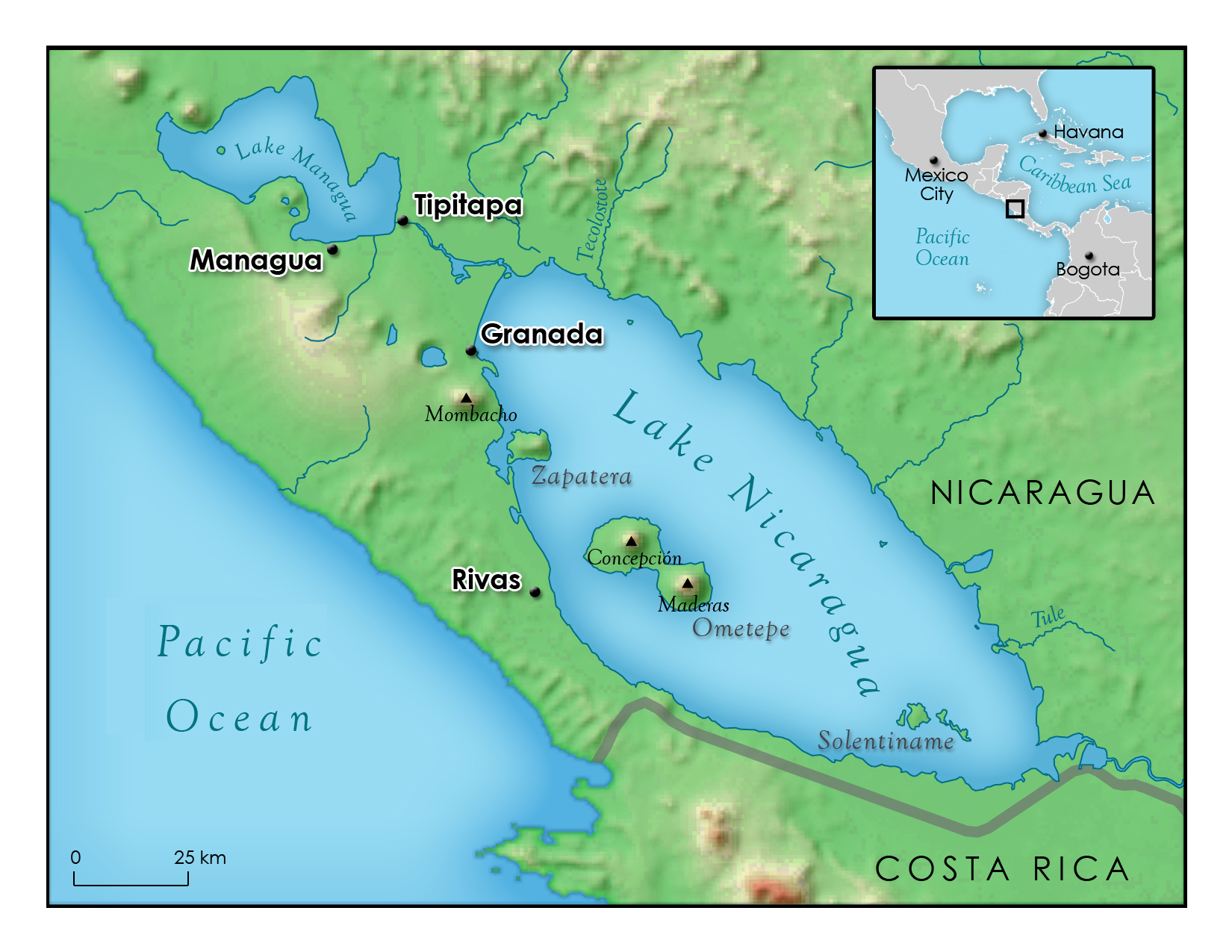
- Location: Southern Nicaragua
- Coordinates: 11°37′N 85°21′W
- Lake type: Rift lake
- Primary inflows: 40+ (including Tipitapa River)
- Primary outflows: San Juan River
- Catchment area: 41,600 km^{2} (16,062 sq mi)
- Basin countries: Nicaragua
- Max. length: 161 km (100 mi)
- Max. width: 71 km (44 mi)
- Surface area: 8,264 km^{2} (3,191 sq mi)
- Average depth: 13.3 m (44 ft)
- Max. depth: 26 m (85 ft)
- Water volume: 110 km^{3} (26 cu mi)
- Surface elevation: 32.7 m (107 ft)
- Islands: 400+ (including Islets of Granada, Ometepe, Solentiname Islands, and Zapatera)
- Settlements: Altagracia, Granada, Moyogalpa, San Carlos, San Jorge

Lake Nicaragua or Cocibolca or Granada (Spanish: Lago de Nicaragua, Lago Cocibolca, Mar Dulce, Gran Lago, Gran Lago Dulce, or Lago de Granada) is a freshwater lake in Nicaragua. Of tectonic origin and with an area of 8,264 km^{2} (3,191 sq mi), it is the largest fresh water lake in Central America, the 19th largest lake in the world (by area) and the tenth largest in the Americas, slightly smaller than Lake Titicaca. With an elevation of 32.7 metres (107 ft) above sea level, the lake reaches a depth of 26 metres (85 ft). The intermittent Tipitapa River feeds Lake Nicaragua when Lake Managua has high water. Lake Cocibolca is between two other bodies of water, on top is Lake Xolotlán and below is the San Juan River. These bodies of water complete the largest international drainage basin in Central America.

The lake drains via the San Juan River flowing east to the Caribbean Sea, historically making the city Granada on the northwest shore an Atlantic port, although Granada (as well as the entire lake) is closer to the Pacific Ocean geographically. The Pacific is near enough to be seen from the mountains of the largest island in the lake, Ometepe. The lake has a history of Caribbean pirates who assaulted Granada on three occasions. Before construction of the Panama Canal, a stagecoach line owned by Cornelius Vanderbilt's Accessory Transit Company connected the lake with the Pacific across the low hills of the narrow Isthmus of Rivas. Plans were made to take advantage of this route to build an Interoceanic Canal, the Nicaragua Canal, but the Panama Canal was built instead. In order to quell competition with the Panama Canal, the U.S. secured all rights to a canal along this route in the Bryan–Chamorro Treaty of 1916. However, since this treaty was mutually rescinded by the United States and Nicaragua in 1970, the idea of another canal in Nicaragua still periodically resurfaced, such as the Ecocanal proposal. In 2014, the government of Nicaragua offered a 50-year concession to the Hong Kong Nicaragua Canal Development Investment Company (HKND) to build a canal across Nicaragua at a cost of US$40 billion, with construction expected to begin in December 2014 and complete in 2019. Protests against the ecological and social effects of the canal as well as questions about financing led to doubts about the project, and in the end construction never began.

== Lake ecology ==
Lake Nicaragua, despite being a freshwater lake, has sawfish, tarpon, and sharks. Initially, scientists thought the sharks in the lake were an endemic species, the Lake Nicaragua shark (Carcharhinus nicaraguensis). In 1961, following comparisons of specimens, it was synonymized with the widespread bull shark (C. leucas), a species also known for entering freshwater elsewhere around the world. It had been presumed that the sharks were trapped within the lake, but this was found to be incorrect in the late 1960s, when it was discovered that they were able to jump along the rapids of the San Juan River — which connects Lake Nicaragua with the Caribbean Sea — almost like salmon. As evidence of these movements, bull sharks tagged inside the lake have later been caught in the open ocean (and vice versa), with some taking as little as 7 days to complete the journey. Numerous other species of fish live in the lake, including at least 16 cichlids that are endemic to the general region. None of these are strictly endemic to Lake Nicaragua, although Amphilophus labiatus is native only to Lake Nicaragua and Lake Managua. A non-native cichlid, a tilapia, is used widely in aquaculture within the lake. Owing to the large amount of waste they produce, and the risk of introducing diseases to which the native fish species have no resistance, they are potentially a serious threat to the lake's ecosystem.

The nation's largest source of freshwater, Nicaraguans call it Lago Cocibolca or Mar Dulce (literally "Sweet Sea"; in Spanish, "freshwater" is agua dulce). The lake has sizeable waves driven by the easterly winds blowing west to the Pacific Ocean. The lake holds Ometepe and Zapatera, which are both volcanic islands, as well as the archipelago of the Solentiname Islands. The lake has a reputation for periodically powerful storms.

In the past 37 years, considerable concern has been expressed about the ecological condition of Lake Nicaragua. In 1981 the Ministry of the Environment and Natural Resources (MARENA) conducted an environmental assessment study and found that half of the water sources sampled were seriously polluted by sewage. It was found that 32 tons (70,000 pounds) of raw sewage were being released into Lake Nicaragua daily. Industry located along the lake's shore had been dumping effluent for an extended period of time. Pennwalt Chemical Corporation was found to be the worst polluter. Nicaragua's economic situation has hampered the building of treatment facilities nationwide (see: Water supply and sanitation in Nicaragua).

The country's worst drought in 32 years took its toll on the lake in 2014; the Nicaraguan government recommended citizens to raise and eat iguanas over chickens to reduce water consumption. Also, plans for the Nicaragua Canal through the lake could lead to saltwater and other contamination during construction and operation of the canal.

== Transport ==
The lake was historically important for both passenger and freight shipping. During the California Gold Rush of the late 1840s a trip up the Rio San Juan, through the lake and then across the short overland stretch was one of the two preferred routes to get from the Atlantic to the Pacific (the other being the overland route through Panama) as overland travel through the continental United States prior to the construction of the transcontinental railroad was too dangerous.

Until the construction of Ometepe Airport the only way to reach the island was by boat. The archipelago of Solentiname is still only reachable by boat. Prior to the construction of a fully paved road to San Carlos (Rio San Juan) travel by boat from Granada via Ometepe to San Carlos was the fastest overland option to reach the Rio San Juan Department.

== See also ==
- Piracy on Lake Nicaragua
- Zapatera Archipelago
