= Rivas Department =

Department of Nicaragua

Coordinates: 11°26′52″N 85°34′17″W

Rivas Departamento de Rivas
- Department
- Flag Coat of arms

- Country: Nicaragua
- Capital: Rivas

Area
  - Department: 2,162 km^{2} (835 sq mi)

Population (2021 estimate)
  - Department: 183,611
  - Density: 84.93/km^{2} (220.0/sq mi)
  - Urban: 91,899
- ISO 3166-2: NI-RI

Rivas (Spanish pronunciation: [ˈriβas]) is a department of the Republic of Nicaragua. It covers an area of 2,162 km^{2} (835 sq mi) and has a population of 183,611 (2021 estimate). The department's capital is the city of Rivas. The indigenous inhabitants of Rivas are the Nicarao, and was the location of the pre-Columbian Nahua chiefdoms of Kwawkapolkan and Kakawatan.

== History ==
In the pre-Columbian era, Rivas was home to the Nahua nations of Kwawkapolkan, and Kakawatan, as well as neighbouring Chibchan peoples. Kwawkapolkan was the most powerful chiefdom in pre-Columbian Nicaragua, ruled by chief Macuilmiquiztli, and translates to "place of capulín trees" in Nawat. It's a combination of the Nawat words Kwawit (tree), kapolin (capulín), and -kan (a locative meaning "place of"). Kwawkapolkan extended from Rivas down to Bagaces in central Guanacaste in Costa Rica.

Kakawatan was another Nahua chiefdom in Rivas, ruled by chief Wemak who was Macuilmiquiztli's cousin. Wemak also had a warrior son named Eskuat, though he wasn't mentioned by Spanish sources again. The name Kakawatan is a combination of the Nawat words kakaw (Cacao), at (water), and -tan (locative suffix meaning land/place of). Therefore Kakawatan translates to "land of cacao water", referring to chocolate drinks, one the most important aspects of Nicarao culture. This tradition is still practiced in the communities of Rivas among the descendants of the Nahuas both indigenous and mestizos alike.

Chibchan minorities lived and thrived within Kwawkapolkan and Kakawatan alongside the Nahua majority. Chibchans also served in the Nahua chiefdoms armed forces to further integrate into Nahua society, as military service provided social advancement and assimilation. The cultivation of potatoes in Kwawkapolkan and Kakawatan also suggests cultural diffusion between the Nahuas and Chibchans, as the Chibchans introduced potatoes to Nicaragua from South America which did not reach northern Mesoamerica. Before and during spanish contact, Kakawatan and Kwawkapolkan had a military alliance and were in a constant state of war with the Chorotegas, the Kingdom of Nicoya, and later fought together against the Spanish. Kwawkapolkan and Kakawatan sent their armies as far north as Carazo during their wars against the Chorotegas, and as far south as the Nicoya Peninsula and southern Guanacaste during their military campaigns against the Kingdom of Nicoya and the Huetares.

== Overview ==
Rivas is known for its fertile soil and beaches. Throughout the department, there are many sugar cane, plantain, tobacco, and other crop plantations. The department borders Lake Nicaragua to the east and the Pacific Ocean to the west. The southern part of the department borders with Costa Rica. A small fishermen village, called San Juan del Sur, has turned into a popular tourist attraction because of its access to beaches in the area. Another major tourist attraction is Ometepe, a large volcanic island inhabited by about 32,000 people (2005 census). Nawat Nicarao people still inhabit the department.

== Municipalities ==
- Altagracia
- Belén
- Buenos Aires
- Cárdenas
- Moyogalpa
- Potosí
- Rivas
- San Jorge
- San Juan del Sur
- Tola
