= Moyogalpa =

- Municipality
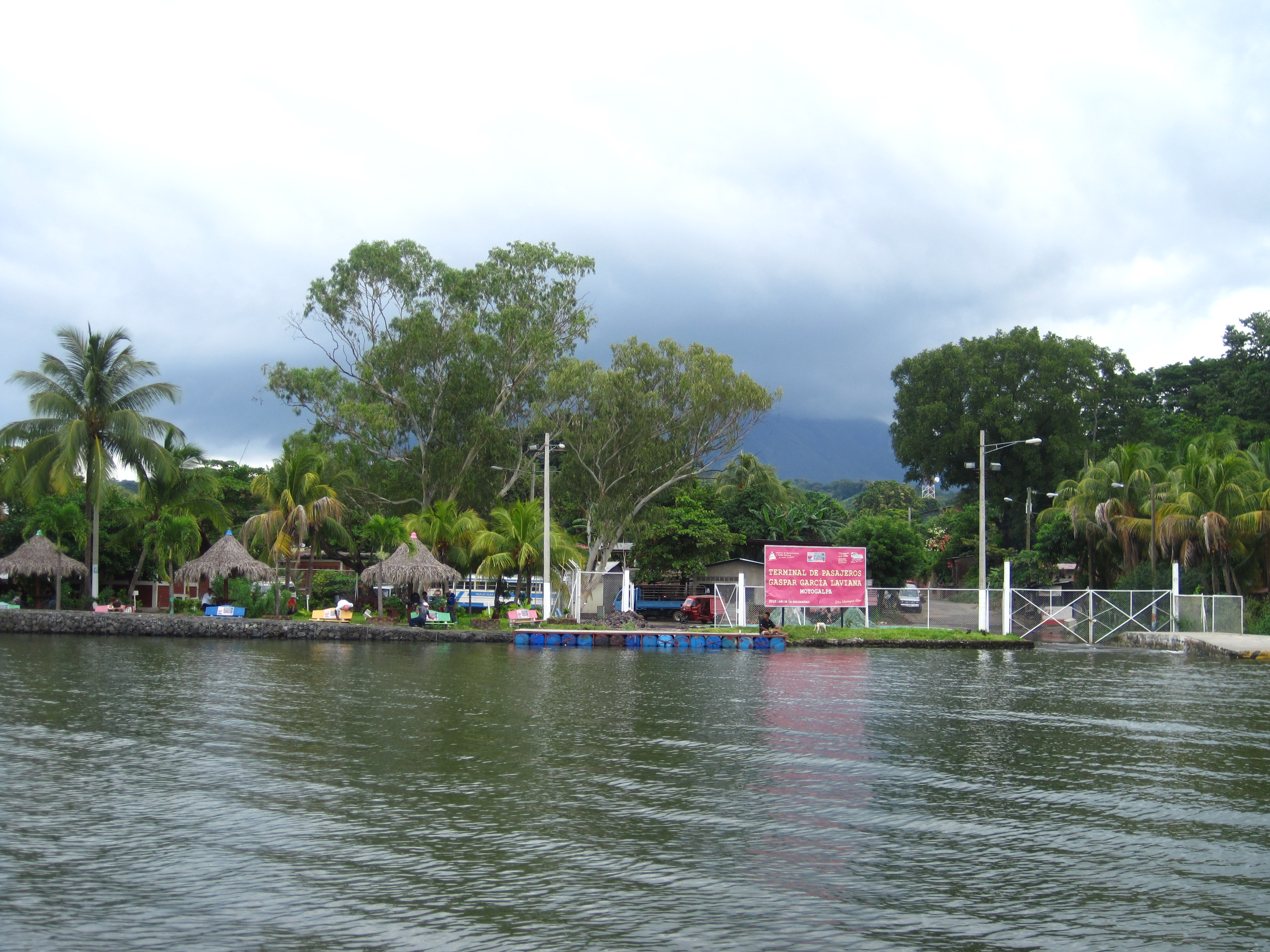
- Port of Moyogalpa, Rivas

- Location in Nicaragua
- Coordinates: 11°32′N 85°42′W
- Country: Nicaragua
- Department: Rivas

Area
  - Municipality: 25 sq mi (66 km^{2})

Population (2005)
  - Municipality: 9,729
  - Density: 380/sq mi (150/km^{2})
  - Urban: 4,795

Moyogalpa (Spanish pronunciation: [moʝoˈɣalpa]) is a municipality in the Rivas department of Nicaragua. Moyogalpa is the largest village and the home of the largest of the three ferry ports on Ometepe Island. There are multiple hotels, hostels, and restaurants on the island, along with small shops called "Pulperias" selling a variety of items from snacks to basic clothing.

== Etymology ==
In the indigenous language Moyogalpa means "place of mosquitos".

== Traditions ==
In Moyogalpa, like many of the towns along the island, people mix Indigenous, European, and Catholic traditions. There is no time when this is better displayed than during the patron saint's festival, which is known for el baile de las Inditas. This dance is supposed to represent the relationship between the Indigenous peoples of Nicaragua and the Europeans and the combining of the two cultures. The woman represents the Indigenous peoples while the man represents the dance. The dance represents the relationship as one filled with love, respect, and chivalry, although not necessarily equality.

== Visiting Here & Getting Around ==
Moyogalpa hosts a wide range of accommodation, from high-end hotels to hammock rental on a balcony. The locals are generally very friendly and welcoming to the 40,000 plus visitors they receive every year. Visitors can take the apollo bus (often mistranslated as "chicken bus" in English) or rent scooters or motorcycles to get around.

== Ferry Port ==
There are multiple ferries and lanchas that run throughout the day, every day, including holidays. The majority run from San Jorge Ferry Port to Moyogalpa, but some run to San José del Sur. Ferry hours are seasonal and somewhat weather dependent.

The majority of people do not bring their vehicle across to the island; they travel on the ferries or lanchas on foot. The majority of vehicle traffic is commercial in nature. A reservation 5 days in advance is recommended if you are bringing a vehicle across in the busy season (mid-November – mid-May).
