= List of airports in Nicaragua =

This is a list of airports in Nicaragua, sorted by location.

== List ==
Airport names indicated in bold indicate that the facility has commercial service on scheduled airlines.

City served	Department	ICAO	IATA	Airport name
**International airports**
Managua	Managua	MNMG	MGA	**Augusto C. Sandino International Airport**
Bluefields	RAAS	MNBL	BEF	**Bluefields Airport**
Chinandega	Chinandega	MNCH		Chinandega Airport (Germán Pomares Ordoñez)
Corn Island	RAAS	MNCI	RNI	**Corn Island Airport**
Puerto Cabezas	RAAN	MNPC	PUZ	**Puerto Cabezas Airport**
San Carlos	Río San Juan	MNSC	NCR	**San Carlos Airport**
Tola	Rivas	MNCE	ECI	Costa Esmeralda Airport
**Domestic airports**
Bonanza	RAAN	MNBZ	BZA	**San Pedro Airport**
Moyogalpa	Rivas	MNLP	OMT	**Ometepe Airport**
Rosita	RAAN	MNRT	RFS	**Rosita Airport**
San Juan de Nicaragua	Río San Juan	MNSN		**San Juan de Nicaragua Airport**
Siuna	RAAN	MNSI	SIU	**Siuna Airport**
Waspam	RAAN	MNWP	WSP	**Waspam Airport**
**Other airports**
Alamikamba, Prinzapolka	RAAN	MNAL		Alamikamba Airport
El Bluff	RAAN	MNFF		El Bluff Airport - closed
El Castillo	Río San Juan	MNPA		Palcasa Airport
Juigalpa	Chontales	MNHG		Hato Grande Airport
Juigalpa	Chontales	MNPG		Pikin Guerrero Airport
Karawala, Desembocadura de la Cruz de Río Grande	RAAS	MNKW		Karawala Airport
La Cumplida, Matagalpa	Matagalpa	MNMT		La Cumplida Airport
La Esperanza	RAAS	MNEP		La Esperanza Airport
Las Lajas	Granada	MNLL		Las Lajas Airport
León	León	MNLN		León Airport
León	León	MNPP		El Papalonal Airport
Los Brasiles, Mateare	Managua	MNBR		Los Brasiles Airport
Nueva Guinea	RAAS	MNNG	NVG	Nueva Guinea Airport - closed
Rivas	Rivas	MNCE		Rivas Airport
San Francisco Libre	Managua	MNFC		Punta Huete Airport (Panchito)
San Juan del Sur	Rivas	MNRV		Morgan's Rock Airport
San Lorenzo	Boaco	MNAM		Altamira Airport
San Rafael del Sur	Managua	MNMR		Montelimar Airport

== See also ==
- Transport in Nicaragua
- List of airports by ICAO code: M#MN - Nicaragua
- Wikipedia: WikiProject Aviation/Airline destination lists: North America#Nicaragua
