= Los Brasiles Airport =

Airport in Mateare, Nicaragua

Los Brasiles Airport Carlos Ulloa Airport
- IATA: none; ICAO: MNBR

Summary
- Airport type: Public
- Owner/Operator: INAC
- Serves: Los Brasiles, Managua
- Elevation AMSL: 262 ft / 80 m
- Coordinates: 12°11′24″N 086°21′14″W

Map
- Location in Nicaragua

Runways
Direction	Length		Surface
Direction	m	ft	Surface
09/27	915	3,002	Asphalt
- Source: GCM Google Maps SkyVector

Los Brasiles Airport (Spanish: Pista Aérea Carlos Ulloa) (ICAO: MNBR) is an airport serving Mateare, a municipality of the Managua Department of Nicaragua. The airport is 2 kilometres (1 mi) west of the Lake Managua shoreline and 4 kilometres (2 mi) south of the Apoyeque volcano.

The Managua VOR-DME (Ident: MGA) is located 11.8 nautical miles (22 km) east-southeast of the airport.

== History ==
In the early 1980s, the airstrip was used primarily by light aircraft for aerial fumigation. The Los Brasiles Airport was renovated in 2010 by the Nicaraguan Civil Aeronautics Authority (INAC).

The Aviation Technical Training Institute (INTECA) was located for several years at Los Brasiles Airport.

== See also ==
- List of airports in Nicaragua
- Transport in Nicaragua
