= Costa Esmeralda Airport =

Emerald Coast Airport Aeropuerto de Costa Esmeralda
- IATA: ECI; ICAO: MNCE

Summary
- Airport type: Public
- Owner/Operator: Instituto Nicaragüense de Aeronáutica Civil, Grupo Pellas
- Serves: Tola
- Elevation AMSL: 75 ft / 23 m
- Coordinates: 11°25′40″N 86°02′00″W
- Website: www.mukulresort.com/costa-esmeralda-airport.html

Map
- Location of the airport in Nicaragua

Runways
Direction	Length		Surface
Direction	m	ft	Surface
03/21	1,525	5,003	Asphalt
- Source: GCM Google Maps SkyVector

Emerald Coast Airport (Spanish: Aeropuerto de Costa Esmeralda) (IATA: ECI, ICAO: MNCE) is an international airport 10 kilometres (6.2 mi) west of Tola, a town in the Rivas Department of Nicaragua. The airport was opened on November 15, 2015, at a cost of almost US$13 million.

The airport is in the countryside 3 kilometres (2 mi) inland from the Pacific coast. There are large hills just north and east of the airport. The runway is aligned with the valley between them. Now the airport operates commercial flights from Costa Rica and Managua but they also get an important number of charters and private flights from all around the world. It is the second busiest airport in Nicaragua

This airport has a Control Tower, Rescue Services, Customs, Shops, Rental Cars, etc. The airport is covered by the Managua VOR-DME (Ident: MGA) and (non-directional beacon) (Ident: YNP) both are located 43.2 nautical miles (80 km) north of the airport.

== Gallery ==
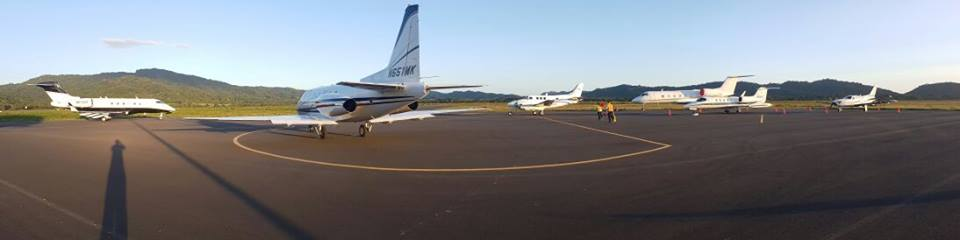
Costa Esmeralda International Airport's ramp, with some private airplanes on it

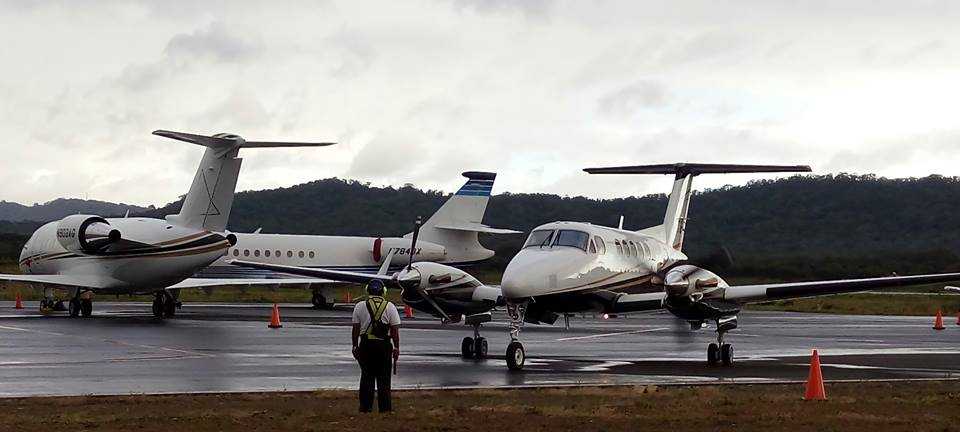
Costa Esmeralda Airport's terminal, with a few private aircraft in view

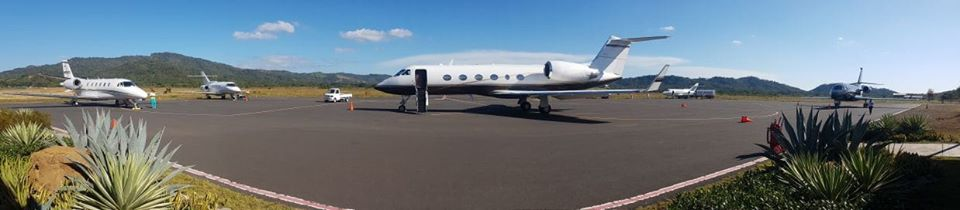
Another view of the terminal

== See also ==
- Transport in Nicaragua
- List of airports in Nicaragua
