= Morgan's Rock Airport =

- IATA: none; ICAO: MNRV

Summary
- Airport type: Private
- Serves: San Juan del Sur, Nicaragua
- Elevation AMSL: 64 ft / 20 m
- Coordinates: 11°18′55″N 85°54′30″W

Map
- Location of the airport in Nicaragua

Runways
Direction	Length		Surface
Direction	m	ft	Surface
08/26	900	2,953	Gravel

Helipads
Number	Length		Surface
Number	m	ft	Surface
	140	459	Concrete
- Sources: GCM Google Maps

Morgan's Rock Airport (ICAO: MNRV) is an airstrip serving the Morgan's Rock eco-lodge and the city of San Juan del Sur in the Rivas Department of Nicaragua.

The airport is in the hills just above the lodge, and is 8 kilometres (5.0 mi) by road west of San Juan del Sur.

The Liberia VOR-DME (Ident: LIB) is located 48.1 nautical miles (89 km) south-southeast of the airstrip. The Managua VOR-DME (Ident: MGA) is located 51.5 nautical miles (95 km) north of Morgan's Rock Airport.

== See also ==
- List of airports in Nicaragua
- Transport in Nicaragua
