= San Juan de Nicaragua Airport =

San Juan de Nicaragua Airport Greytown Airport
- IATA: none; ICAO: MNSN

Summary
- Airport type: Public
- Owner/Operator: INAC
- Serves: San Juan de Nicaragua, Nicaragua
- Elevation AMSL: 32 ft / 10 m
- Coordinates: 10°55′14″N 83°42′30″W

Map
- Location in Nicaragua

Runways
Direction	Length		Surface
Direction	m	ft	Surface
10/28	1,500	4,921	Concrete
- Source: Google Maps

San Juan de Nicaragua Airport (Spanish: Aeropuerto de San Juan de Nicaragua) (ICAO: MNSN) is an airport located in San Juan de Nicaragua, Río San Juan, Nicaragua. The airport was built in 2012 at a cost of almost US$17 million.

The airport is 3.5 kilometres (2.2 mi) southeast of the town, and must be reached by boat.

The Bluefields VOR/DME (ident: BLU) is located 64.2 nautical miles (119 km) north of the airport. The Limon VOR/DME (Ident: LIO) is located 69.9 nautical miles (129 km) southeast of the airport.

== See also ==
- Transport in Nicaragua
- List of airports in Nicaragua
