= Montelimar Airport =

Montelimar Airport Aeropuerto Montelimar
- IATA: none; ICAO: MNMR

Summary
- Airport type: Public
- Owner/Operator: INAC; Grupo Barceló (es)
- Serves: Montelimar, Nicaragua
- Elevation AMSL: 94 ft / 29 m
- Coordinates: 11°48′20″N 86°30′40″W

Map
- Location in Nicaragua

Runways
| Direction | Length | | Surface |
| Direction | m | ft | Surface |
|---|---|---|---|
| 05/23 | 2,036 | 6,680 | Asphalt |
- Source: GCM Google Maps SkyVector

Montelimar Airport (Spanish: Aeropuerto Montelimar) (ICAO: MNMR) is an airport serving the municipality of San Rafael del Sur, Nicaragua.

The airport is on the Pacific coast. Southwest approaches and departures are over the water. The runway length includes displaced thresholds on both ends. Marked runway length is 1,465 metres (4,806 ft).

The Managua VOR-DME (Ident: MGA) is located 28.8 nautical miles (53 km) east-southeast of the airport.

== History ==
The airfield is next to the Barceló Montelimar Hotel and Resort. The current location of the hotel is the old Somoza Estate, confiscated by the government in 1979 and sold to the Spanish hotel chain Grupo Barceló in 1993 for US$3 million.

In 2012, the government of Nicaragua and representatives of Grupo Barceló announced a joint venture to build an international airport at the Hotel Barceló Montelimar. The new airport will be 75 percent owned by the government and 25 percent owned by Grupo Barceló.

== See also ==
- List of airports in Nicaragua
- Transport in Nicaragua
