= León Airport (Nicaragua) =

León Airport Fanor Urroz Airport
- IATA: none; ICAO: MNLN

Summary
- Airport type: Public
- Owner/Operator: INAC
- Serves: León
- Elevation AMSL: 328 ft / 100 m
- Coordinates: 12°25′45″N 086°54′10″W

Map
- Location in Nicaragua

Runways
| Direction | Length | | Surface |
| Direction | m | ft | Surface |
|---|---|---|---|
| 09/27 | 929 | 3,048 | Asphalt |
- Source: GCM SkyVector HERE Maps

León Airport (Spanish: Pista Aérea Fanor Urroz) (ICAO: MNLN) is an airport serving León, the capital of the León Department of Nicaragua. The airport is on the southwest side of the city.

The Managua VOR-DME (Ident: MGA) is located 46.1 nautical miles (85 km) east-southeast of the airport.

== History ==
In December 1972, a few days after the Managua earthquake, the León Airport, also known as the Aeropuerto Godoy, was used for landing aircraft with supplies and aid for the earthquake victims.

The airfield was attacked by the Sandinista guerrilla on April 27, 1979, during the final days of the insurrection against the Somoza regime.

In the early 1980 the airstrip was used primarily by light aircraft for aerial fumigation. The airfield was renovated in 2010 by the Nicaraguan Civil Aeronautics Authority (INAC).

== See also ==
- List of airports in Nicaragua
- Transport in Nicaragua
