= La Esperanza Airport =

La Esperanza Airport may refer to following airports in Latin America:

- La Esperanza Airport (Bolivia), near La Esperanza, Santa Cruz Department
- La Esperanza Airport (Chile), near Marchigüe, O'Higgins Region
- La Esperanza Airport (Intibucá), near La Esperanza, Intibucá Department, Honduras
- La Esperanza Airport (Nicaragua), near La Esperanza, South Caribbean Coast Autonomous Region
