= Hato Grande Airport =

- IATA: none; ICAO: MNHG

Summary
- Airport type: Public
- Serves: Hato Grande, Nicaragua
- Elevation AMSL: 177 ft / 54 m
- Coordinates: 11°58′55″N 85°26′00″W

Map
- Location in Nicaragua

Runways
Direction	Length		Surface
Direction	m	ft	Surface
05/23	800	2,625	Dirt
- Sources: Google Maps OurAirports

Hato Grande Airport (ICAO: MNHG) is an airport serving the hamlet of Hato Grande in the Chontales Department of Nicaragua. The runway is 14 kilometres (8.7 mi) southwest of Juigalpa.

There is rising terrain north through northwest of the runway.

The Managua VOR-DME (Ident: MGA) is located 43.7 nautical miles (81 km) west of the airport.

== See also ==
- Transport in Nicaragua
- List of airports in Nicaragua
