= Palcasa Airport =

- IATA: none; ICAO: MNPA

Summary
- Airport type: Public
- Owner/Operator: Palmares del Castillo S.A.
- Serves: El Castillo
- Elevation AMSL: 174 ft / 53 m
- Coordinates: 11°04′00″N 84°24′35″W

Map
- Location of the airport in Nicaragua

Runways
Direction	Length		Surface
Direction	m	ft	Surface
09/27	835	2,740	Asphalt
- Sources: HERE Maps

Palcasa Airport (ICAO: MNPA) is an airport serving the town of El Castillo in Río San Juan Department, Nicaragua. The airport is 5.5 kilometres (3.4 mi) north of El Castillo, midway between the small towns of La Palma and Las Colinas. It is surrounded by and supports the palm oil plantations of Palmares del Castillo S.A. (PALCASA).

The Bluefields VOR-DME (Ident: BLU) is located 67.0 nautical miles (124 km) northeast of the airport. The El Coco VOR-DME (Ident: TIO) is located 65.5 nautical miles (121 km) south of the airport.

== See also ==
- List of airports in Nicaragua
- Transport in Nicaragua
