= El Bluff Airport =

- IATA: none; ICAO: MNFF

Summary
- Airport type: Closed
- Serves: El Bluff
- Elevation AMSL: 1 ft / 0 m
- Coordinates: 11°59′30″N 83°41′22″W

Map
- Location of the airport in Nicaragua

Runways
Direction	Length		Surface
Direction	ft	m	Surface
Closed
- Sources: GCM Google Maps

El Bluff Airport (ICAO: MNFF) was an airport on El Bluff, once an island in the entrance to Bluefields Bay, South Caribbean Coast Autonomous Region, Nicaragua, but now connected to the mainland via a causeway constructed between 2004 and 2007. Google Earth Historical Imagery show progressive deterioration of the asphalt runway until a helicopter pad and hangar were built on the southwestern end in 2013. The hangar was torn down and the helipad markings removed sometime after 2015.

The area is now served by Bluefields Airport (IATA: BEF, ICAO: MNBL) 9 kilometres (5.6 mi) across the bay at Bluefields, the regional capital.

== See also ==
- List of airports in Nicaragua
- Transport in Nicaragua
