= La Cumplida Airport =

- IATA: none; ICAO: MNMT

Summary
- Airport type: Public
- Serves: La Cumplida
- Elevation AMSL: 2,420 ft / 738 m
- Coordinates: 12°59′45″N 85°51′10″W

Map
- Location of the airport in Nicaragua

Runways
Direction	Length		Surface
Direction	m	ft	Surface
09/27	740	2,428	Grass
- Sources: Google Maps

La Cumplida Airport (ICAO: MNMT) is an airport serving the village of La Cumplida in Matagalpa Department, Nicaragua.

The airport is in a basin with rising terrain in all quadrants, and a nearby mountain ridge to the west. The lowest terrain is to the east of the runway.

The Managua VOR-DME (Ident: MGA) is located 54.1 nautical miles (100 km) south-southwest of the airport.

== See also ==
- List of airports in Nicaragua
- Transport in Nicaragua
