= Altamira Airport (Nicaragua) =

- IATA: none; ICAO: MNAM

Summary
- Airport type: Public
- Serves: Altamira, Nicaragua
- Elevation AMSL: 121 ft / 37 m
- Coordinates: 12°08′10″N 85°42′55″W

Map
- Location of the airport in Nicaragua

Runways
Direction	Length		Surface
Direction	m	ft	Surface
10/28	690	2,264	Concrete
- Sources: GCM Google Maps

Altamira Airport (ICAO: MNAM) is an airport serving the Agrícola Miramontes farming complex in the Boaco Department of Nicaragua. The runway is 4.8 kilometres (3 mi) north of Lake Nicaragua.

The Managua VOR-DME (Ident: MGA) is located 26.0 nautical miles (48 km) west of the airport.

== See also ==
- List of airports in Nicaragua
- Transport in Nicaragua
