= Huete =

Huete may refer to:

== People ==
- Félix Huete (1914–2000), Spanish football player
- Luis Huete (born 1956), Spanish professor
- Pepito Ramos Huete (born 1951), Spanish football player

== Places ==
- Huete, Spain
- Punta Huete Airport, Nicaragua

== Other ==
- Battle of Huete
