= Pikin Guerrero Airport =

- IATA: none; ICAO: MNPG

Summary
- Airport type: Public
- Serves: Pikin Guerrero, Nicaragua
- Elevation AMSL: 141 ft / 43 m
- Coordinates: 11°55′20″N 85°20′20″W

Map
- Location of the airport in Nicaragua

Runways
Direction	Length		Surface
Direction	m	ft	Surface
08/26	760	2,493	Grass
- Sources: Google Maps

Pikin Guerrero Airport (ICAO: MNPG) is a rural airstrip serving the hamlet of Pikin Guerrero in the Chontales Department of Nicaragua. The runway is 1.5 kilometres (1 mi) east of the hamlet and 4.7 kilometres (3 mi) north of the Lake Nicaragua shoreline.

The Managua VOR-DME (Ident: MGA) is located 49.9 nautical miles (92 km) west of the airstrip.

== See also ==
- List of airports in Nicaragua
- Transport in Nicaragua
