= Alamikamba Airport =

- IATA: none; ICAO: MNAL

Summary
- Airport type: Public
- Serves: Alamikamba
- Elevation AMSL: 65 ft / 20 m
- Coordinates: 13°30′50″N 84°14′50″W

Map
- Location of the airport in Nicaragua

Runways
Direction	Length		Surface
Direction	m	ft	Surface
05/23	940	3,084	Grass
- Sources: GCM Google Maps

Alamikamba Airport (ICAO: MNAL) is an airstrip serving the Prinzapolka River village of Alamikamba in the North Caribbean Coast Autonomous Region, Nicaragua. The runway is 3 kilometres (1.9 mi) northwest of the river bend.

== See also ==
- List of airports in Nicaragua
- Transport in Nicaragua
