= MNSI =

MNSI, MnSi or MNSi may refer to

- MNSi Telecom, a Canadian Internet service provider
- Manganese monosilicide, a material with the chemical formula MnSi
- Brownleeite, a mineral with the chemical formula MnSi
- Siuna Airport in Nicaragua (ICAO code MNSI)
