= Nueva Guinea Airport =

Nueva Guinea Airport Aeropuerto de Nueva Guinea
- IATA: NVG; ICAO: MNNG

Summary
- Airport type: Closed
- Location: Nueva Guinea, Nicaragua
- Elevation AMSL: 690 ft / 210 m
- Coordinates: 11°41′12″N 84°27′30″W

Map
- Location in Nicaragua

Runways
Direction	Length		Surface
Direction	ft	m	Surface
Closed

Nueva Guinea Airport (Spanish: Aeropuerto de Nueva Guinea) (IATA: NVG, ICAO: MNNG) was an airfield located in Nueva Guinea, Nicaragua. According to the Mayor's office of Nueva Guinea, the strip of land that used for landing was decommissioned as an airstrip more than 20 years ago due to the centrality within the city. Since the land is located in the center of the urban area of the town, frequent vehicles travelled across the land making landing unsafe. Since decommission as an airfield, the land has slowly been allocated for city buildings, a park, and Catholic church.

== See also ==
- Transport in Nicaragua
- List of airports in Nicaragua
