= WSP =

WSP may refer to:

== Organizations ==
- Washington State Patrol, the state police agency for the U.S. state of Washington
- Wasserschutzpolizei, the German water police
- Water and Sanitation Program, a trust fund administered by the World Bank geared at improving access to water and sanitation
- Website Pros, now part of Web.com
- Women Strike for Peace, a United States women's peace activist group
- WSP Global, a Canadian-based management and consultancy services business, formerly the London-based WSP Group
- WSP New Zealand, formerly WSP Opus, a subsidiary of WSP Global

== Technology and science ==
- Wandering salesman problem, in discrete optimization, similar to the travelling salesman problem
- Waste stabilization pond, a low-cost basic wastewater treatment process
- Water safety plan, for drinking water
- Web service provider, a provider of a method of communication between two electronic devices over a network
- Web service protocol, for example JSON-WSP
- Wireless Session Protocol, upper layer of the Wireless Application Protocol stack
- Wheel slide protection, used on rail vehicles
- Wireless Short-Packet; see EnOcean
- World Soundscape Project, an acoustic ecology research project

== Places ==
- Wasco State Prison, a state prison in California, US
- Washington Square Park, public park in New York City
- Waspam Airport (IATA Code), Nicaragua
- Wetumpka State Penitentiary, a former prison in Alabama, US
- Wyoming State Penitentiary

== Other uses ==
- Wantagh State Parkway, in New York
- Warring States Period, ancient Chinese war from 475 - 221 BC
- Widespread Panic, an American jam band
- Wigan St Patricks, an amateur rugby league club based in Wigan, England

== See also ==
- Wire strike protection system, for helicopters
- Windows Search Protocol (MS-WSP), a remote query protocol used in Microsoft File Explorer
