= Montelimar (disambiguation) =

Montelimar is a town in the Drôme department in France.

Montelimar may also refer to

- Montelimar Beach, Nicaragua
  - Montelimar Airport
- Montelimar, an Italian wine grape also known as Dolcetto
- Montelimar nougat, a sweet
- UMS Montélimar, a football team in France
