= San Carlos Airport (Nicaragua) =

San Carlos Airport Aeródromo de San Carlos
- IATA: NCR; ICAO: MNSC

Summary
- Airport type: Public
- Owner/Operator: Instituto Nicaragüense de Aeronáutica Civil (INAC)
- Serves: San Carlos, Nicaragua
- Elevation AMSL: 160 ft / 49 m
- Coordinates: 11°8′00″N 84°46′20″W

Map
- Location in Nicaragua

Runways
Direction	Length		Surface
Direction	m	ft	Surface
05/23	800	2,625	Gravel
- GCM HERE Maps

San Carlos Airport (Spanish: Aeródromo de San Carlos) (IATA: NCR, ICAO: MNSC) is an airfield serving San Carlos, Río San Juan Department, Nicaragua. The domestic airline La Costeña has daily scheduled flights from Managua to San Carlos.

The Los Chiles non-directional beacon (Ident: CHI) is located 6.7 nautical miles (12.4 km) south-southeast of the airport.

== See also ==
- List of airports in Nicaragua
- Transport in Nicaragua
