= La Esperanza Airport (Nicaragua) =

- IATA: none; ICAO: MNEP

Summary
- Airport type: Public
- Serves: La Esperanza, Nicaragua
- Elevation AMSL: 88 ft / 27 m
- Coordinates: 12°11′58″N 84°16′30″W

Map
- Location of the airport in Nicaragua

Runways
Direction	Length		Surface
Direction	m	ft	Surface
09/27	1,000	3,281	Grass
- Sources: GCM HERE Maps

La Esperanza Airport (ICAO: MNEP) is an airport serving the Escondido River village of La Esperanza in the South Caribbean Coast Autonomous Region of Nicaragua. The airport is east of the village, on the opposite side of the river.

The Bluefields VOR-DME (Ident: BLU) is located 32.0 nautical miles (59 km) east-southeast of the airport.

== See also ==
- List of airports in Nicaragua
- Transport in Nicaragua
