= MNPP =

MNPP may refer to:

- Mongolian National Progress Party
- El Papalonal Airport (ICAO code: MNPP)
- Migrating Native Peoples Program; see Native Friendship Centre
