= Rosita Airport =

- IATA: RFS; ICAO: MNRT

Summary
- Airport type: Private
- Operator: Republic of Nicaragua
- Serves: Rosita
- Elevation AMSL: 193 ft / 59 m
- Coordinates: 13°53′30″N 84°24′30″W

Map
- Location in Nicaragua

Runways
Direction	Length		Surface
Direction	m	ft	Surface
05/23	1,975	6,480	Gravel
- Sources: GCM SkyVector

Rosita Airport (IATA: RFS, ICAO: MNRT) is a private airport serving Rosita, Nicaragua. The runway is 3 kilometres (1.9 mi) south of town.

== See also ==
- List of airports in Nicaragua
- Transport in Nicaragua
