= List of lighthouses in Nicaragua =

This is a list of lighthouses in Nicaragua.

== Lighthouses ==
Name	Image	Year built	Coordinates	Class of Light	Focal height	NGA number	Admiralty number	Range nml
El Bluff Lighthouse	Image	n/a	El Bluff; 11°59′35.9″N 83°41′05.0″W	Fl W 3.8s.	50 metres (160 ft)	16500	J6064	14
Isla El Cardon Lighthouse	Image	1876	Corinto; 12°28′32.8″N 87°11′25.6″W	L Fl W 10s.	27 metres (89 ft)	15400	G3352	10
Islas Farallones Lighthouse	Image	n/a	Gulf of Fonseca; 13°04′43.1″N 87°40′48.3″W	Q W	n/a	15398	G3356	n/a
Isla Pequeña del Maiz Lighthouse	Image	n/a	Corn Islands; 12°17′25.6″N 82°58′58.4″W	Fl W	n/a	16502	J6065	8
San Juan del Sur Lighthouse	Image	1900 est.	San Juan del Sur; 11°14′35.0″N 85°52′51.2″W	Fl W 6s.	30 metres (98 ft)	15440	G3350	16

== See also ==
- Lists of lighthouses
