= Siuna Airport =

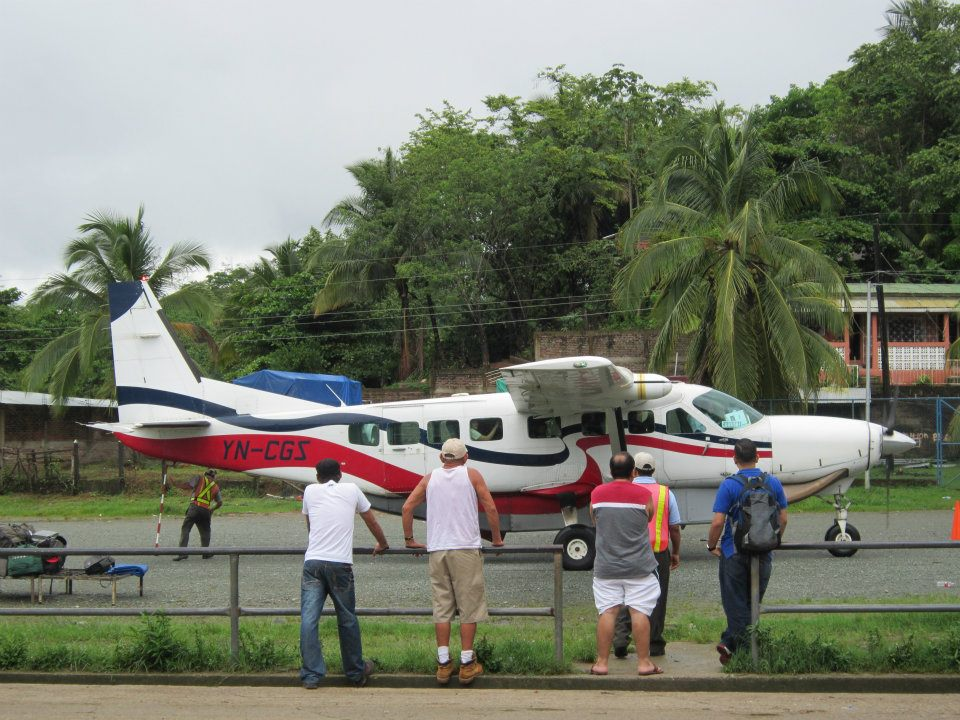
- IATA: SIU; ICAO: MNSI

Summary
- Airport type: Private
- Operator: Republic of Nicaragua
- Serves: Siuna, Nicaragua
- Elevation AMSL: 606 ft / 185 m
- Coordinates: 13°43′50″N 84°46′40″W

Map
- Location in Nicaragua

Runways
| Direction | Length | | Surface |
| Direction | m | ft | Surface |
|---|---|---|---|
| 16/34 | 1,120 | 3,675 | Gravel |
- Sources: GCM Google Maps SkyVector

Siuna Airport (IATA: SIU, ICAO: MNSI) is an airport serving Siuna, Nicaragua. The airport is in the southern part of the town.

The runway runs uphill to the north, with an elevation change of 130 feet (40 m). There are nearby hills to the north and east.

== See also ==
- Transport in Nicaragua
- List of airports in Nicaragua
