= El Papalonal Airport =

- IATA: none; ICAO: MNPP

Summary
- Airport type: Public
- Serves: El Papalonal
- Elevation AMSL: 141 ft / 43 m
- Coordinates: 12°28′15″N 86°28′25″W

Map
- Location of the airport in Nicaragua

Runways
Direction	Length		Surface
Direction	m	ft	Surface
10/28	1,525	5,003	Grass
- Sources: Google Maps

El Papalonal Airport (ICAO: MNPP) is an airstrip serving the village of El Papalonal in León Department, Nicaragua

In 1981, American intelligence officials discovered that the airstrip was used as a departure point for aircraft delivering weapons to El Salvadorian rebels.

== See also ==
- List of airports in Nicaragua
- Transport in Nicaragua
