= Waspam Airport =

- IATA: WSP; ICAO: MNWP

Summary
- Airport type: Private
- Serves: Waspam
- Elevation AMSL: 108 ft / 33 m
- Coordinates: 14°44′25″N 83°58′10″W

Map
- Location in Nicaragua

Runways
Direction	Length		Surface
Direction	m	ft	Surface
04/22	1,250	4,101	Gravel
- GCM SkyVector

Waspam Airport (IATA: WSP, ICAO: MNWP) is an airport serving Waspam, a town on the Coco River on Nicaragua's border with Honduras.

== See also ==
- List of airports in Nicaragua
- Transport in Nicaragua
- Honduras–Nicaragua border
