= Punta Huete Airport =

Punta Huete Airport Aeropuerto Internacional Punta Huete
- IATA: none; ICAO: MNFC

Summary
- Airport type: Public (under expansion) / formerly Military
- Owner: República de Nicaragua
- Serves: Managua, Nicaragua
- Location: San Francisco Libre, Managua Department
- Elevation AMSL: 217 ft (66 m)
- Coordinates: 12°21′12″N 86°11′00″W

Map
- Location within Nicaragua

Runways
Direction	Length		Surface
Direction	m	ft	Surface
09/27	3,600	11,811	Concrete

Punta Huete Airport ( ICAO: MNFC), also known as Panchito Airport, is an airport located in the municipality of San Francisco Libre in the Managua Department of Nicaragua. It is situated in a sparsely populated area on the northern shore of Lake Managua. The nearest town is San Benito, approximately 14 kilometres (9 mi) to the east.

In 2010, a new VOR was installed on the field. The Managua VOR-DME (Ident: MGA) is located 12.7 nautical miles (24 km) south of the airport.

== History ==
Punta Huete Airport was built in the 1980s for the landing of MiG-21 airplanes. After Humberto Ortega revealed that Nicaragua had approached France and the Soviet Union for Mirage or MiG fighter planes, the United States warned against introducing modern combat jets to the region. Although Nicaragua began construction of the new airbase with a longer runway and protective revetments, it did not succeed in acquiring new fighter aircraft.

In 2010, the airfield was renovated as a weather alternate for Augusto C. Sandino International Airport in Managua. Located on the north shore of Lake Managua, the airport was noted for its potential to become a major facility due to its long runway, which could already accommodate large aircraft such as the Boeing 747.

== Expansion and reconstruction (2024–present) ==
In August 2024, the Nicaraguan government launched a major project titled “Reconstrucción, Ampliación y Mejoramiento del Aeropuerto Internacional Punta Huete.” The project is being financed and constructed primarily by the Chinese state-owned company China CAMC Engineering Co., Ltd. (Camce), with a total investment of approximately US$517.6 million.

As of early October 2026, construction had reached approximately 34–35% overall completion.

=== Key progress ===
- The main runway has been fully reconstructed and extended to 3,600 metres (11,811 ft) in length using high-strength hydraulic concrete, making it the longest civil aviation runway in Central America.
- The primary taxiway has been completed.
- The runway is being widened from 45 metres to 60–75 metres to accommodate large commercial aircraft.
- More than 9,600 tons of steel structure have been installed in the passenger terminal and administrative buildings.
- Approximately 950 workers and 625 pieces of machinery are active across 37 simultaneous work fronts.
- A new 14-kilometre, four-lane access highway is under construction in parallel.

The airport is being developed to ICAO Category 4F standards and is projected to handle up to 3.5 million passengers and around 35,000 flights per year once completed. The official target completion date is October 2028, although authorities have stated that the current pace of work could allow the project to finish earlier.
