= La Esperanza Airport (Chile) =

- IATA: none; ICAO: SCMH

Summary
- Airport type: Private
- Serves: Marchigüe, Chile
- Elevation AMSL: 540 ft / 165 m
- Coordinates: 34°17′20″S 71°33′03″W

Map
- Location of La Esperanza Airport in Chile

Runways
| Direction | Length | | Surface |
| Direction | m | ft | Surface |
|---|---|---|---|
| 17/35 | 700 | 2,297 | Grass |
- Source: Landings.com Google Maps GCM

La Esperanza Airport Spanish: Aeropuerto de La Esperanza, (ICAO: SCMH) is an airstrip 13 kilometres (8.1 mi) north-northeast of Marchigüe, a town in the O'Higgins Region of Chile.

== See also ==
- Transport in Chile
- List of airports in Chile
