= Corn Islands =

- Municipality
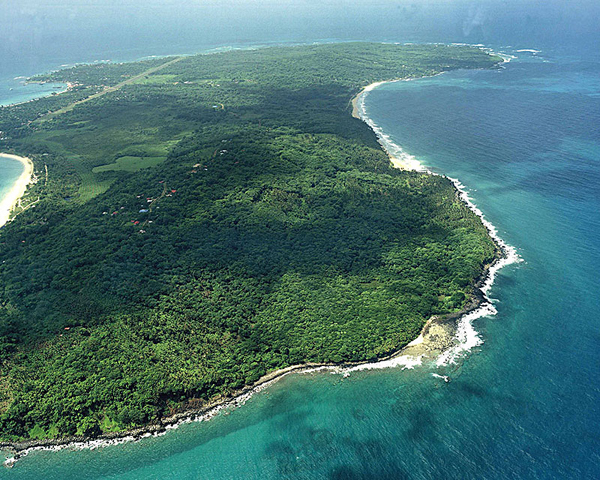
- View of the Corn Islands

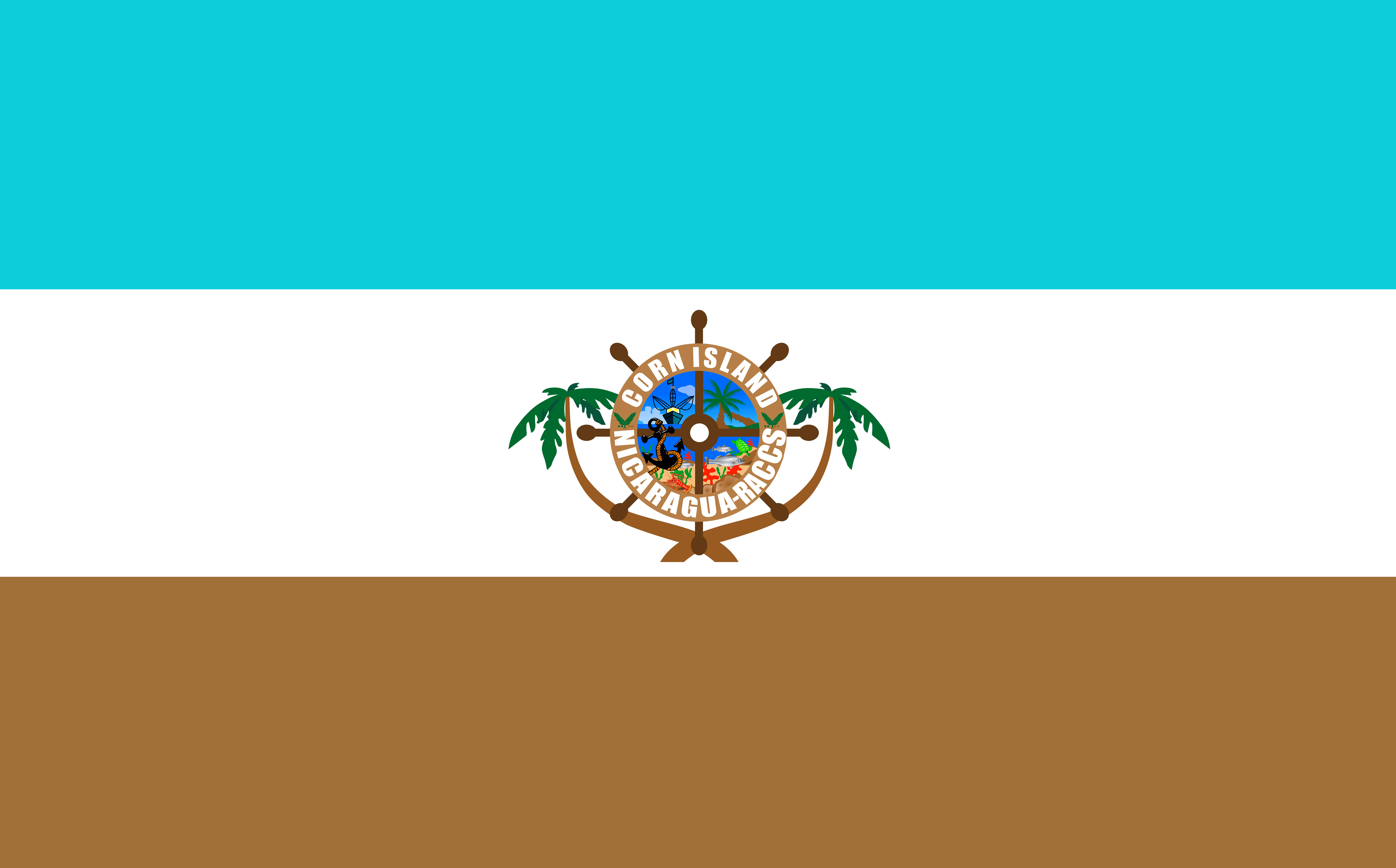
- Flag
- Motto: The Eden of the Caribbean of Nicaragua
- Anthem: Corn Island song
- Interactive map of Corn Islands
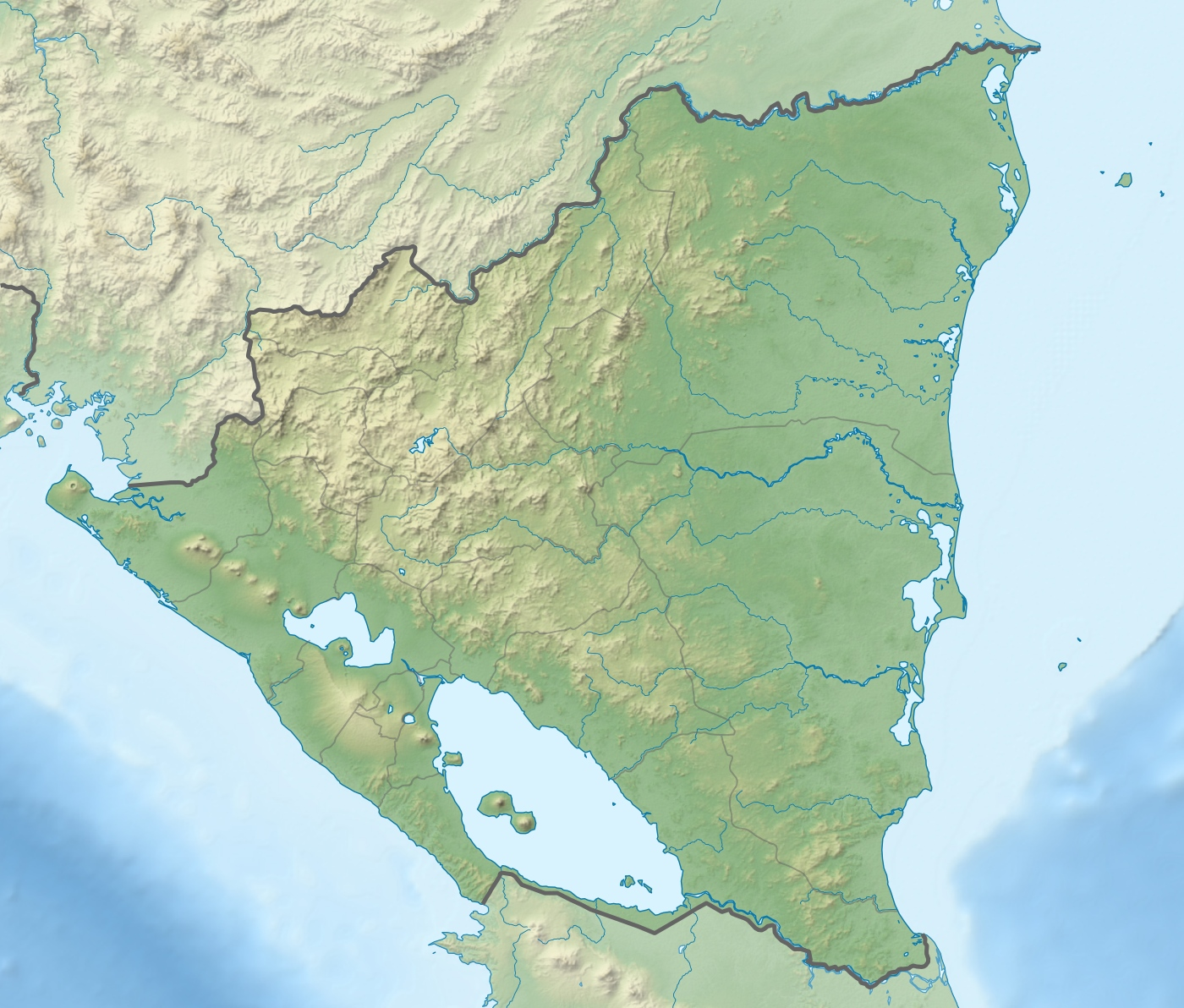
- Location in Nicaragua
- Coordinates: 12°10′N 83°02′W
- Country: Nicaragua
- Region: South Caribbean Coast Autonomous Region
- Established: 1400
- Founder: British
- Seat: Brig Bay

Government
  - Type: Mayor-council government
  - Mayor: Cleaveland Webster (FSLN)

Area
  - Municipality: 3.5 sq mi (9.0 km^{2})
- Elevation: 371 ft (113 m)

Population (2023 estimate)
  - Municipality: 7,912
  - Urban: 7,912
- Time zone: Central Standard Time
- Postal code: 82100
- Area code: +505
- Website: www.cornisland.gob.ni

Corn Islands (Spanish: Islas del Maíz) is a municipality of the South Caribbean Coast Autonomous Region of Nicaragua. It is located approximately 70 km (43 mi) east of the Caribbean mainland. The municipality consists of two islands: Big Corn Island (Isla Grande del Maíz) and Little Corn Island (Isla Pequeña del Maíz). The islands are known for their Afro-Caribbean cultural heritage, coral reef ecosystems and tourism-based economy.

== History ==
According to Edward Conzemius, a French ethnologist from Luxembourg, in 1929 he stated in his article Les Îles Corn du Nicaragua (The Corn Islands of Nicaragua), that the first inhabitants of Corn Island were the Indigenous Kukras, who were exterminated by the also Indigenous Miskitos in alliance with the English buccaneers.

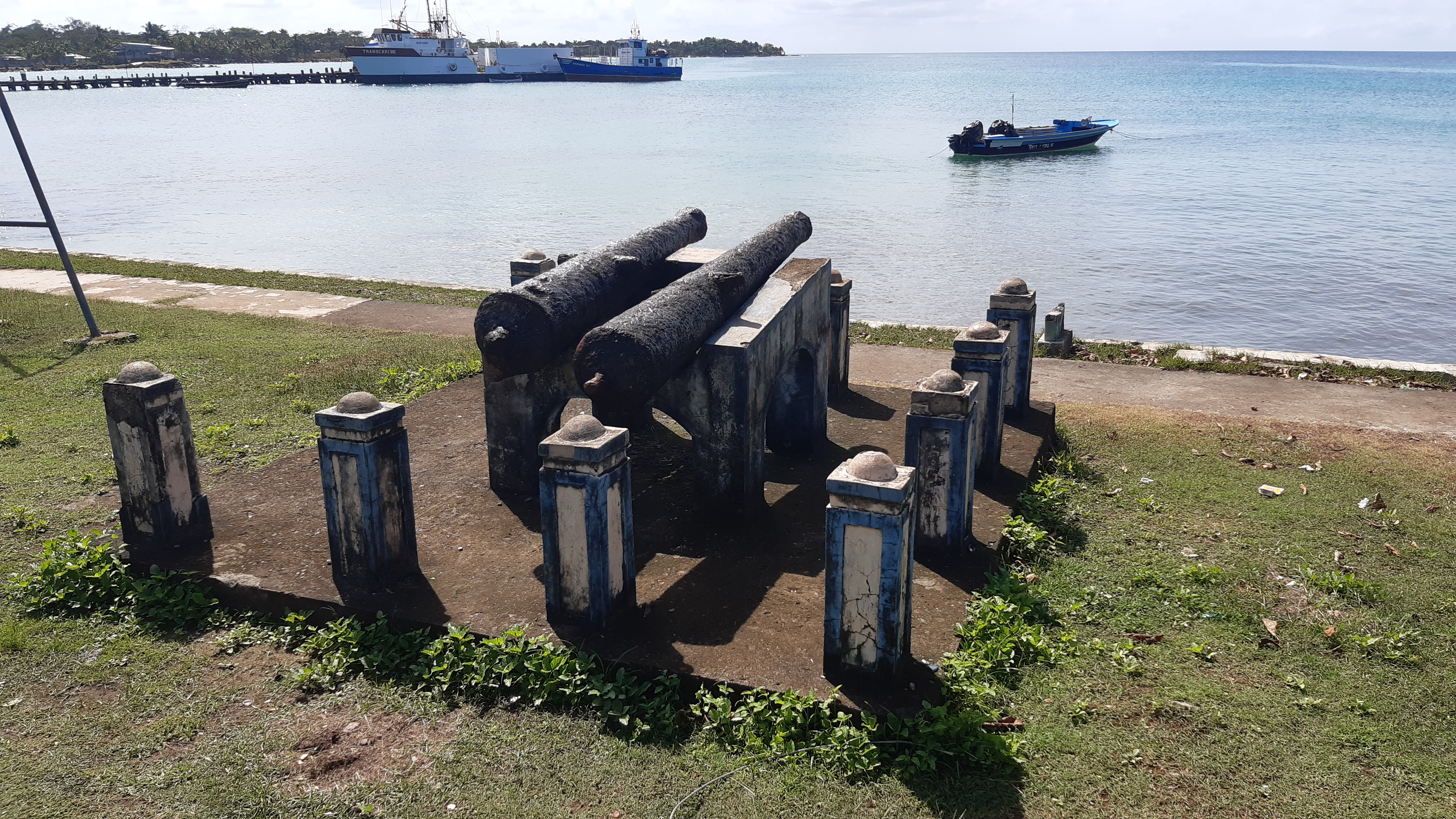
Cannon on display overlooking Brig Bay on Great Corn Island

The island was used to resupply firewood and water, repair their ships, and support their fishing activities. Puritan settlers of British origin arrived on the island in the mid-18th century, bringing with them their slaves of African origin. It is known that they came from Jamaica, settling in British Honduras (now Belize) until they reached the Atlantic coast of Nicaragua.

The first settlers preferred to inhabit the southeastern part of the island. This was for several reasons: Quinn Hill's height offered a panoramic view of the sea, from which they could see the arrival of pirate ships as they approached "Insurance Harbor", a strategic port on the island that provided facilities for anchoring and unloading boats. This port, "Insurance Harbour", also has historical importance since Colonel Alexander McDonald, superintendent of British Honduras (today Belize), landed on August 27, 1841.

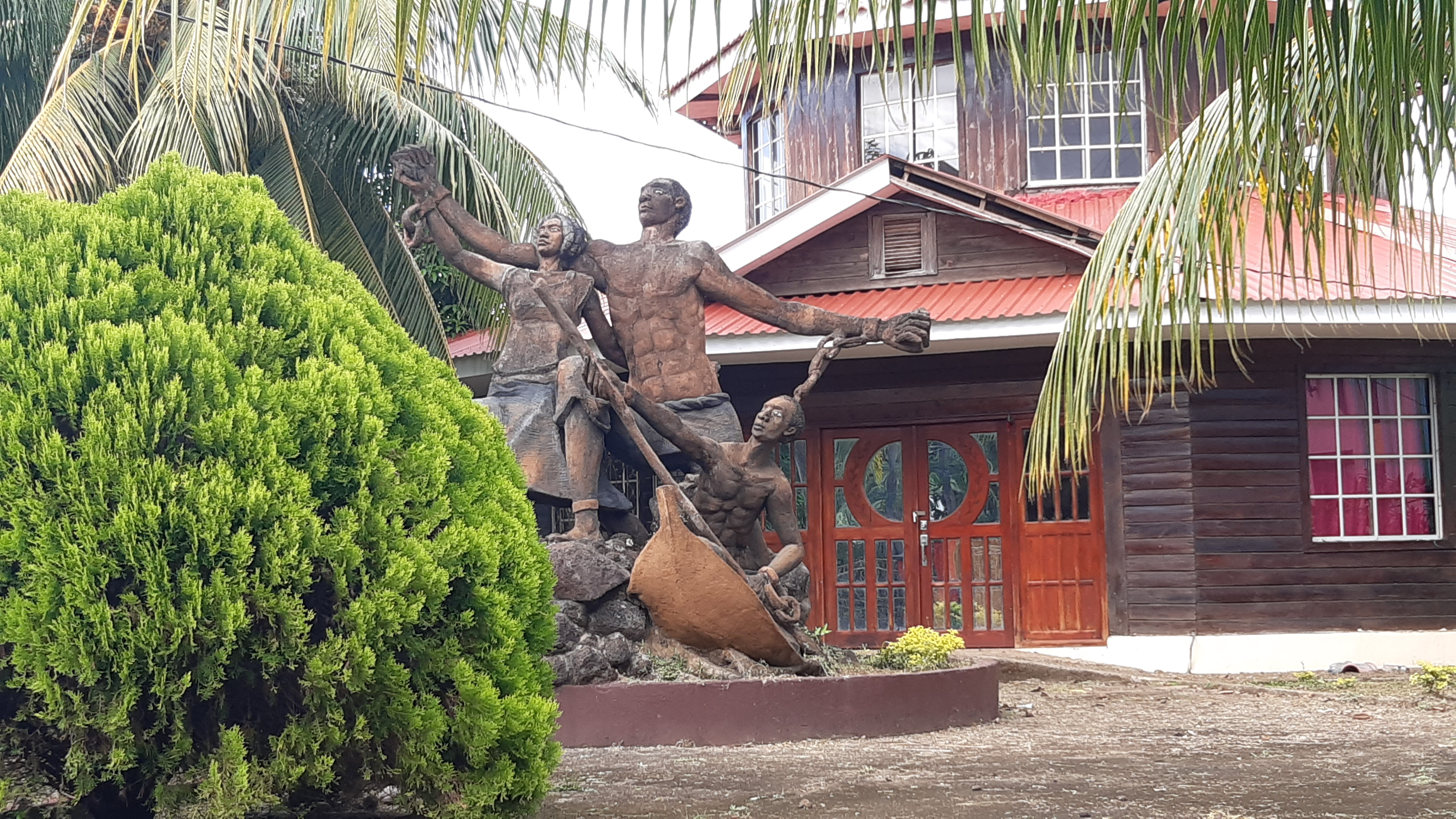
Monumento de la Emancipación, commemorating the emancipation of enslaved Africans and their descendants, located in front of the Culture House on Great Corn Island

This superintendent was the one who ordered to call the enslaved laborers, at the point called South West Bay, to declare them free from slavery, in the name of Queen Victoria of Great Britain and King Robert Charles Frederic of Mosquitia.

After the English colonists established themselves in the Corn Islands, a process of acculturation began. Most of the settlers came to these Islands as adventurers and explorers in search of fortunes and riches. They settled permanently and interacted with the enslaved laborers. A product of this relationship is the Creole descent of the Corn Islands. Over time, these descendants gradually assimilated and adapted the customs and traditions of English culture. Slavery was abolished on the Corn Islands in 1843.

In 1852, Reverend Edward Kelly from British Honduras founded the Ebenezer Baptist Church and School, the first Christian institution built on the islands. Ebenezer Baptist was the only church in the Corn Islands until 1901, when the Saint James Episcopal Church of Corn Island was founded.

The Corn Islands were also part of the British protectorate of the Kingdom of Mosquitia, from 1740 to 1860. At some point, the islands were frequented by Caribbean pirates. In 1894, the Nicaraguan government occupied the area militarily. The islands were handed over to the United States for a 99-year lease under the Bryan-Chamorro Treaty of August 5, 1914. Under the terms of that treaty, they were subject to U.S. law, but Nicaraguan sovereignty was maintained.

In 1940, Corn Island was elevated to a municipality in the Zelaya Region (as the region was known at the time) by presidential decree.

The United States maintained the right to the actual or potential use of the islands until April 25, 1971, the date on which the agreement was officially canceled with the repeal of the Chamorro-Bryan treaty, under the presidency of Anastasio Somoza Debayle, from July 14, 1970.

Before that event, the municipality had a governor rather than a mayor, as it does now. The mayors were previously elected in a community assembly, where, in addition to the highest municipal representative, the judge and secretary were also elected. The first popular vote elections in which all the people participated were at the beginning of the 20th century.

== Geography ==
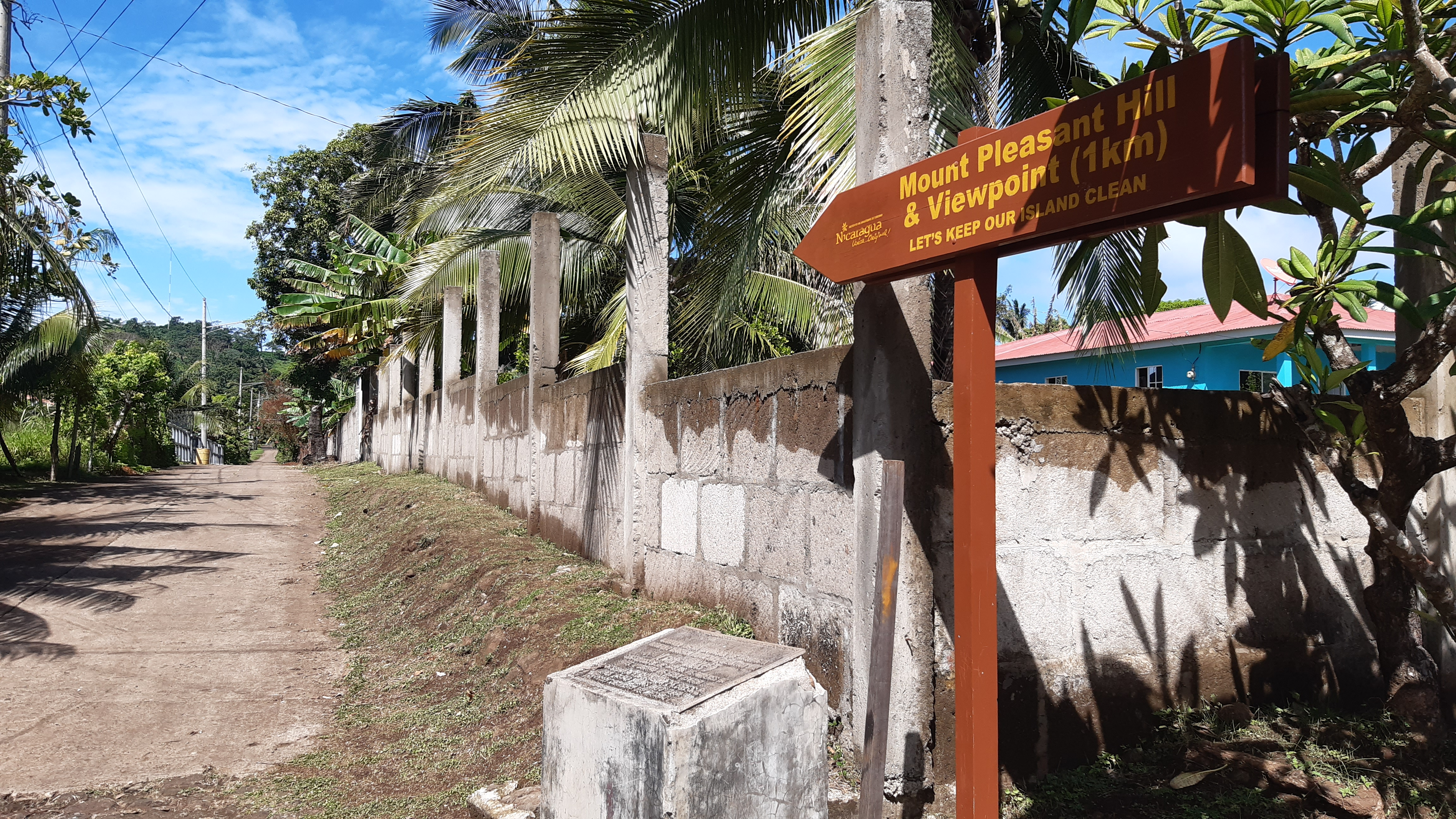
A signpost indicating the direction for Mount Pleasant Hill and viewpoint

Big Corn Island covers approximately 10 square kilometers, while Little Corn Island covers approximately 3 square kilometers. The terrain is generally low-lying with gentle hills, the highest point being Mount Pleasant on Big Corn Island, the islands are surrounded by coral reefs and seagrass beds, forming part of the wider Caribbean marine ecosystem.

=== Climate ===
The climate is tropical maritime, with a rainy season typically from May to November and a drier season from December to April. The islands are occasionally affected by tropical storms and hurricanes originating in the Caribbean Sea.

=== Environment and conservation ===
The surrounding marine areas have been recognized for their ecological importance due to coral reefs, lobster fisheries, and a sea turtle nesting habitat. Conservation initiatives have been implemented to protect marine biodiversity and regulate fishing practices.

Climate data for Corn Islands, Nicaragua
| Month | Jan | Feb | Mar | Apr | May | Jun | Jul | Aug | Sep | Oct | Nov | Dec | Year |
|---|---|---|---|---|---|---|---|---|---|---|---|---|---|
| Mean daily maximum °C (°F) | 27.8 (82.0) | 28.4 (83.1) | 29.0 (84.2) | 29.8 (85.6) | 29.9 (85.8) | 28.9 (84.0) | 28.1 (82.6) | 28.5 (83.3) | 29.1 (84.4) | 28.8 (83.8) | 28.4 (83.1) | 28.0 (82.4) | 28.7 (83.7) |
| Daily mean °C (°F) | 24.9 (76.8) | 25.2 (77.4) | 26.2 (79.2) | 27.0 (80.6) | 27.0 (80.6) | 26.0 (78.8) | 25.6 (78.1) | 25.6 (78.1) | 25.8 (78.4) | 25.6 (78.1) | 25.3 (77.5) | 25.2 (77.4) | 25.8 (78.4) |
| Mean daily minimum °C (°F) | 22.2 (72.0) | 22.3 (72.1) | 23.3 (73.9) | 23.7 (74.7) | 24.2 (75.6) | 23.9 (75.0) | 23.7 (74.7) | 23.6 (74.5) | 23.5 (74.3) | 23.1 (73.6) | 22.8 (73.0) | 22.6 (72.7) | 23.2 (73.8) |
| Average precipitation mm (inches) | 218 (8.6) | 114 (4.5) | 71 (2.8) | 101 (4.0) | 264 (10.4) | 581 (22.9) | 828 (32.6) | 638 (25.1) | 383 (15.1) | 418 (16.5) | 376 (14.8) | 328 (12.9) | 4,320 (170.2) |
| Average rainy days (≥ 1.0 mm) | 19 | 13 | 10 | 10 | 15 | 23 | 26 | 25 | 21 | 21 | 20 | 22 | 225 |
Source: HKO

== Demographics and culture ==
The municipality has a population of approximately 7,912, distributed between Big Corn Island and Little Corn Island.

English-based Creole and Spanish are widely spoken. The islands historically developed a strong English-speaking Afro-Caribbean cultural identity, influenced by British and Jamaican migration during the 19th century.

Cultural traditions reflect Afro-Caribbean heritage, including music, cuisine, and religious practices. Seafood, coconut-based dishes, and crab soup are prominent in local gastronomy.

== Subdivisions ==
The municipality of Corn Island is subdivided into six neighborhoods (barrios), five of which are on Great Corn Island, while Little Corn Island constitutes the sixth Neighborhood:

| Neighborhood | Location | Sub-divisions |
|---|---|---|
| Brig Bay | west | Passion Street, Vicente, Pomar, South West Bay, Woula Point, Broad Bay. |
| Quinn Hill | south | Bluff Point, Hill Road |
| South End | east | Long Bay, Mount Pleasant, Rama |
| Sally Peachie | northeast | Sally Peachie, Little Hill, Sand Fly Bay |
| North End | northwest | North End, Back Road |
| Little Corn Island | island 13 km northeast | The Village, Carib Town |

== Transportation ==
Corn Islands Lighthouse
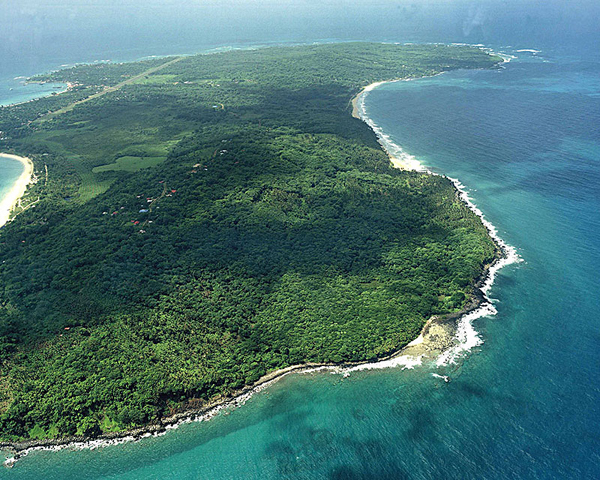
- Location: Corn Islands, South Caribbean Coast Autonomous Region, Nicaragua
- Coordinates: 12°17′24″N 82°58′58″W

Tower
- Construction: concrete (foundation), metal (tower)
- Height: 15 m (49 ft)
- Shape: square pyramidal skeletal tower with balcony and light
- Markings: White
- Power source: solar power
- Operator: Aquatic Transport Directorate

Light
- Focal height: 50 m (160 ft)
- Range: 8 nmi (15 km; 9.2 mi)
- Characteristic: Fl W

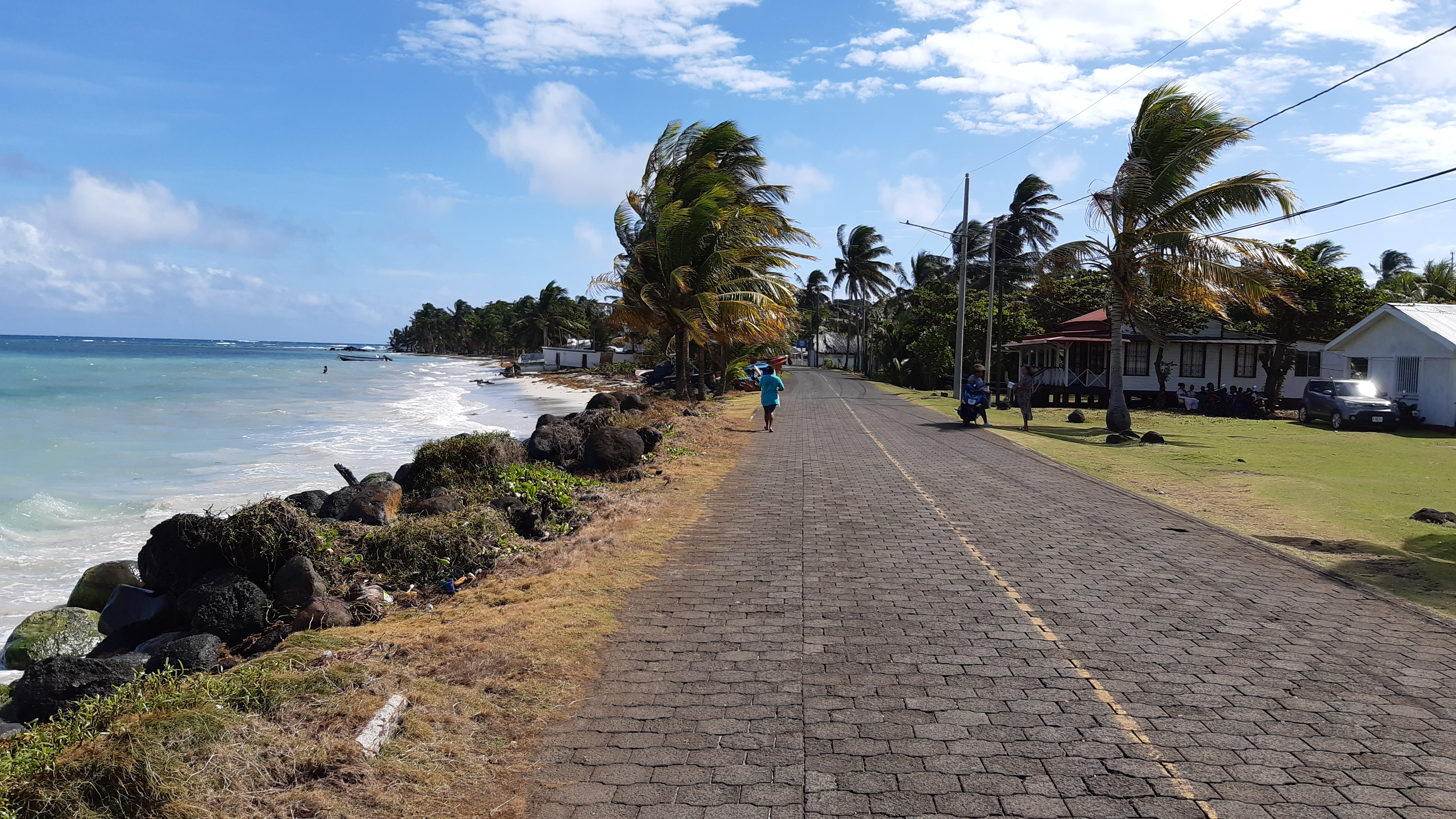
A typical road surface on Great Corn Island

Great Corn Island has a paved road about 12 kilometres (7.5 mi) long, which runs the island's length. Automobiles, motorbikes, and bicycles are the primary means of transport on the island. Most cars are used as taxis and cost 20 Cordobas for each ride of an adult person. The only other public transportation option is the bus that circles the island clockwise and costs ten cordobas.

Little Corn Island is accessible by fast boats, usually three or four times per day depending on weather from Great Corn Island, and by a small cargo ship from the port at Southwest Bay on Great Corn Island (World Port Index No. 9775). Little Corn Island has no motor vehicles. Due to its small size, all transport on the island is done on foot.

=== Air ===
Great Corn Island can be reached by a La Costeña flight from Managua or Bluefields, which arrive twice a day at Corn Island Airport.

=== Sea ===
Great Corn Island can be reached by a ferry or a small speedboat from the city of Bluefields that leaves from there every Wednesday and Saturday to the island.

== Economy and tourism ==
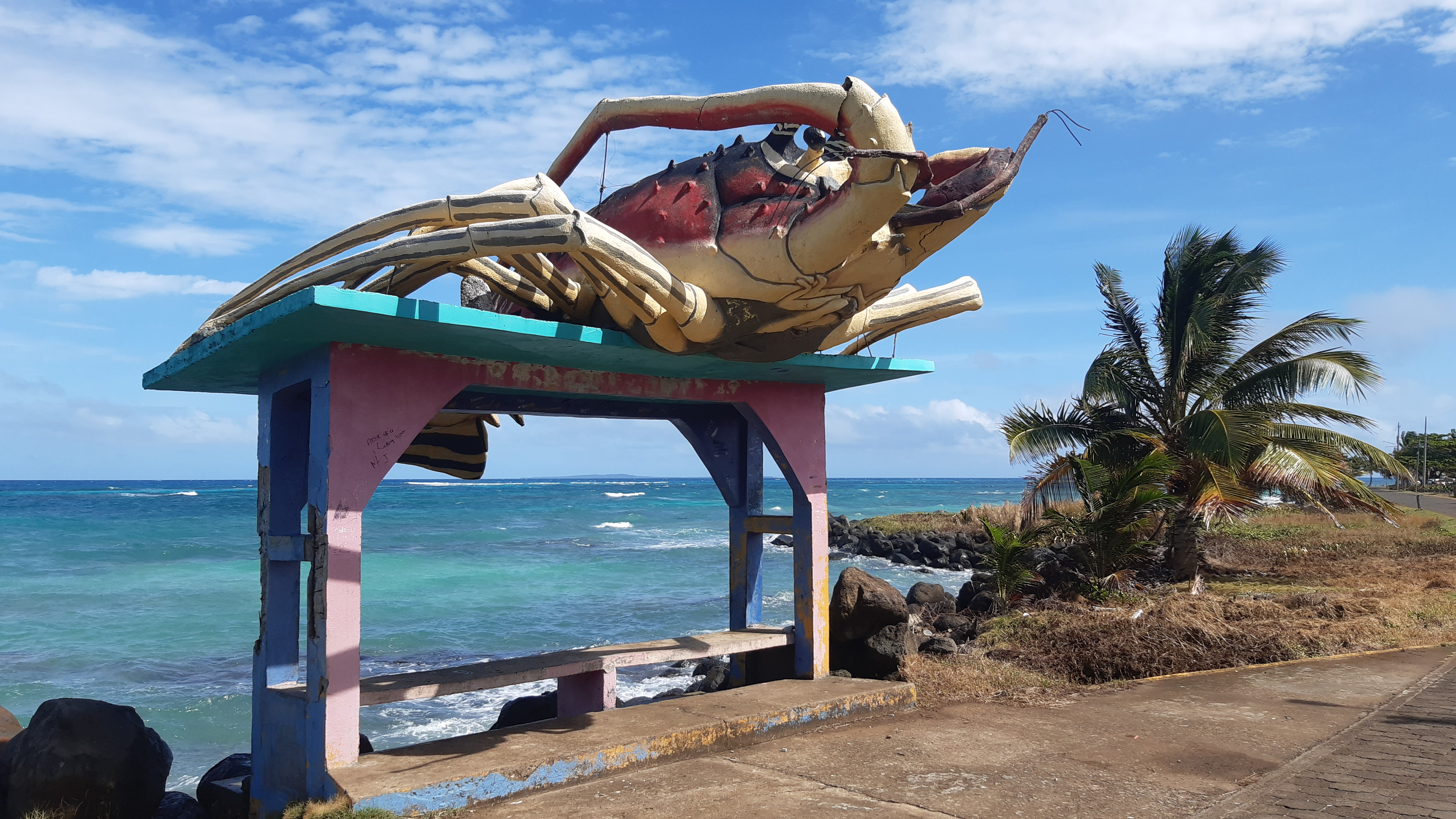
A bus shelter on the island, with a lobster statue on top

Throughout most of the 20th century, the economy revolved around coconut production. During the 1960s and 1970s, commercial fishing as well as lobster and shrimp fishing became the primary industry. However, the recent growth in tourism throughout the region has also affected the islands. Tourism on the islands has grown considerably, with their many surrounding coral reefs making them a popular destination for scuba diving and snorkeling.

Barracudas, nurse sharks, hammerhead sharks, green sea turtles, and spotted eagle rays are among the marine life that can be seen around the islands.

== Sports ==
Baseball is a popular sport in the Corn Islands. The main stadium on the island is the Karen Tucker Baseball Stadium.

Volleyball and Football are also Sports that many islanders play.

== Gastronomy ==
The cuisine of Corn Island is varied; most of the dishes are seafood- and boco-based.

Corn Island's typical dishes include crab soup, rondon, fried fish, and rice with shrimp.

== Notable people ==
- Cheslor Cuthbert, professional baseball player for the Chicago White Sox

== Gallery ==
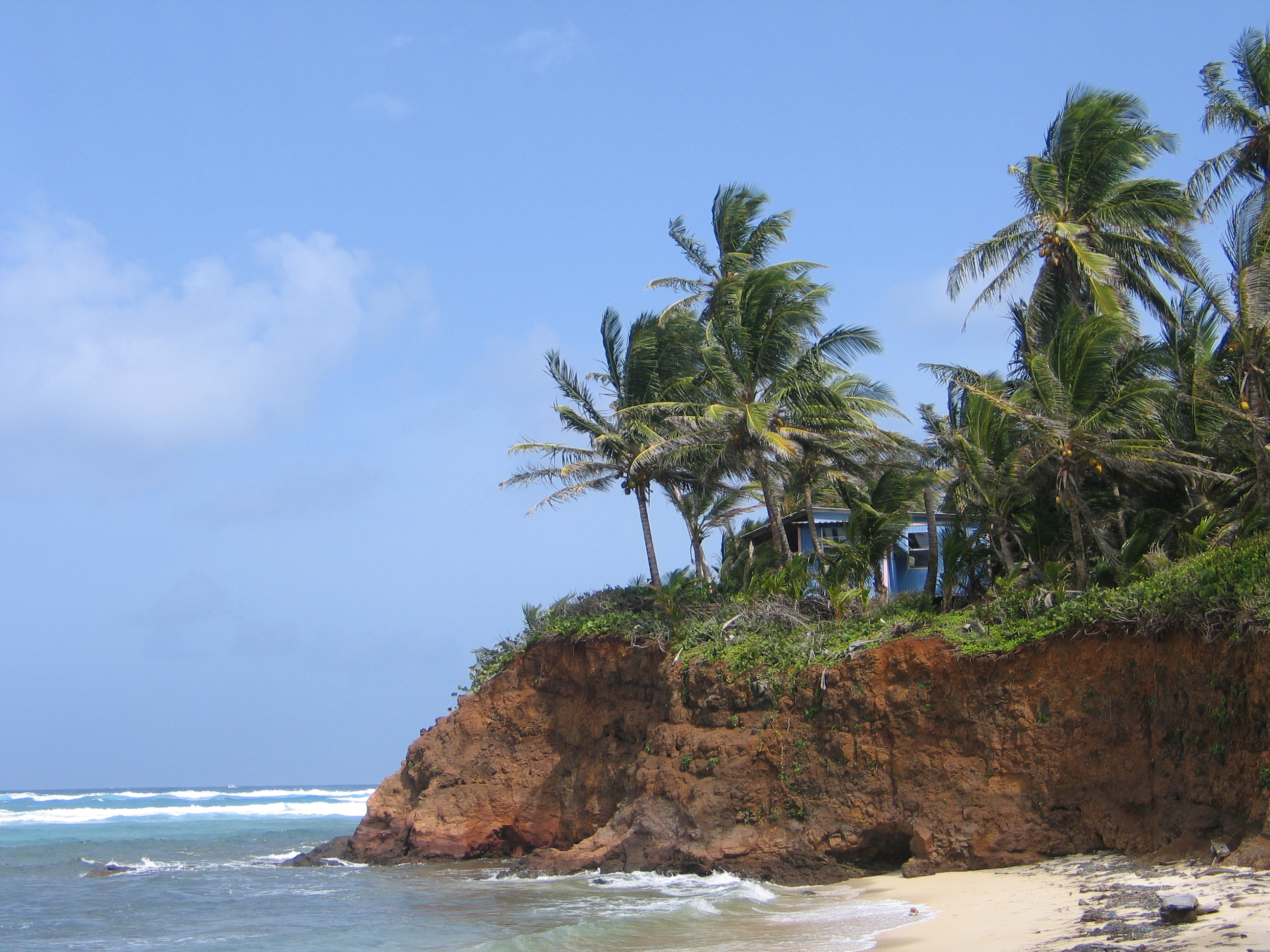
Coast of Little Corn Island

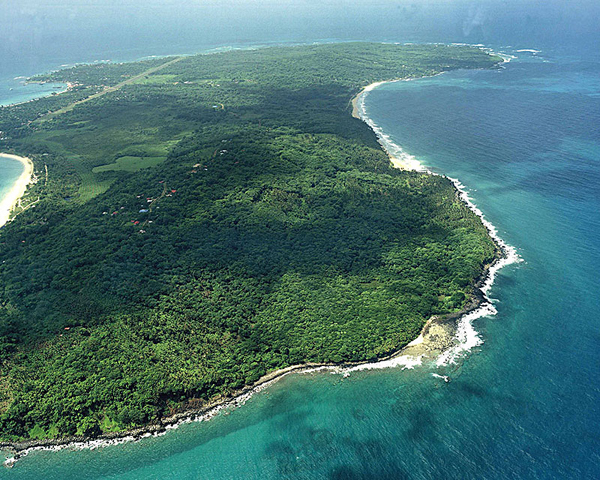
Aerial view of Great Corn Island

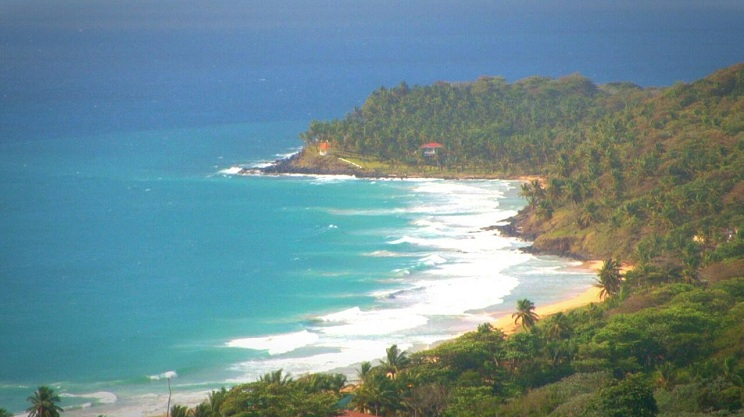
Long Bay, Great Corn Island

== See also ==
- List of lighthouses in Nicaragua
