= Luis Huete =

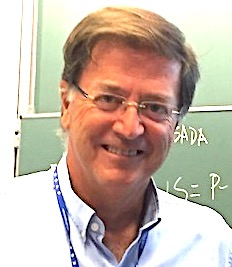
- Luis Huete, IESE
- Born: 1956 (age 68–69); Spain
- Occupation(s): Lawyer, economist, professor, author

Luis Huete (born 1956, Spain) is a Spanish professor at IESE Business School, University of Navarra.

== Biography ==
He holds a degree in Law at the University of Navarra and an MBA from IESE Business School. Afterwards he earned his doctorate in Business Administration from Boston University. He was a Fulbright Scholar. His dissertation on strategy in commercial banking services was named the best dissertation of the year in the United States in 1988.

== Publications ==
He is the author of twelve management books and also a frequent contributor of articles to the business press.
