= San Rafael del Sur =

- Municipality
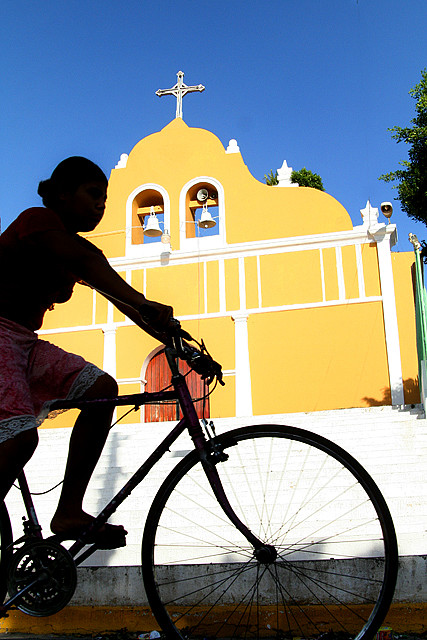

- Location in Nicaragua
- Coordinates: 11°51′N 86°27′W
- Country: Nicaragua
- Department: Managua

Government
  - Mayor: José Noel Cerda

Area
  - Total: 138 sq mi (357 km^{2})

Population (2023)
  - Total: 56,286
  - Density: 408/sq mi (158/km^{2})
  - Town/Settlement: 37,965

San Rafael del Sur is a town and a municipality in the Managua department of Nicaragua.

== International relations ==
=== Twin towns – Sister cities ===
Granada is twinned with:

- Berlin Friedrichshain-Kreuzberg, Germany

== Areas ==
Some areas of San Rafael del Sur are:

- El Salto
- Los Gutierrez norte
- Los Gutierrez sur
- Los Sanchez norte
- Los Sanchez sur
- San Pablo
- Los Velasquez
