= San Francisco Libre =

- Municipality
- Location in Nicaragua
- Coordinates: 12°30′N 86°18′W
- Country: Nicaragua
- Department: Managua

Government
  - Mayor: José Ángel Velásquez

Area
  - Municipality: 292 sq mi (756 km^{2})

Population (2005)
  - Municipality: 10,503
  - Density: 36.0/sq mi (13.9/km^{2})
  - Urban: 3,080

San Francisco Libre (Spanish pronunciation: [saɱ fɾanˈsisko ˈliβɾe]) is a municipality in the Managua department of Nicaragua.

== International relations ==
=== Twin towns – Sister cities ===
San Francisco Libre is twinned with Reading (UK).

- (England) Reading, United Kingdom
