= Tola, Nicaragua =

Tola
- Municipality
- Location in Nicaragua
- Coordinates: 11°26′N 85°56′W
- Country: Nicaragua
- Department: Rivas

Area
  - Municipality: 184 sq mi (477 km^{2})

Population (2005)
  - Municipality: 22,012
  - Density: 120/sq mi (46.1/km^{2})
  - Urban: 5,815

Tola is a municipality in the Rivas department of Nicaragua. Tola means "Land of Tula", or "Land of the Toltecs" and its etymology derives from Nahuatl Tōllān, the altepetl of the Classic and Post Classic Toltec Empire of central Mexico. Tola is a direct reference to the Toltec ancestry of the Nahuas in Nicaragua. The indigenous inhabitants of Tola are the Nahuas.

As of 2023, the estimated population of Tola is 23,927.
