= El Bluff =

Faro de El Bluff
- Location: Bluff; South Caribbean Coast Autonomous Region; Nicaragua
- Coordinates: 11°59′35.9″N 83°41′05.0″W

Tower
- Foundation: concrete base
- Construction: metal skeletal tower
- Height: 8 metres (26 ft)
- Shape: square pyramidal skeletal tower
- Markings: white tower
- Power source: solar power

Light
- Focal height: 50 metres (160 ft)
- Range: 14 nautical miles (26 km; 16 mi)
- Characteristic: Fl W 3.8s.

Bluff is a port city on the Caribbean coast of Nicaragua within the bay of Bluefields. Bluff handles limited cargo and has basic piers. It is also a base for the sea-going fishing vessels on Nicaragua's Caribbean coast.

The island that it sits on is now connected to the mainland via a causeway constructed between 2004 and 2007.

== See also ==
- List of lighthouses in Nicaragua
- Transport in Nicaragua
