= Mateare =

- Municipality
- Location in Nicaragua
- Coordinates: 12°13′N 86°25′W
- Country: Nicaragua
- Department: Managua

Government
  - Mayor: Miriam Salinas

Area
  - Municipality: 115 sq mi (297 km^{2})

Population (2022 estimate)
  - Municipality: 64,732
  - Density: 564/sq mi (218/km^{2})
  - Urban: 61,234

Mateare is a town and a municipality in the Managua department of Nicaragua. The municipality covers an area of 297 km^{2} and has an estimated population of 64,732.

== History ==
Mateare, founded in 1898, is as old as the first cities founded by the Spanish in the late 19th century. In 1955 the city of Mateare suffered earthquakes that measured up to 6.0 on the Richter magnitude scale over a period of 14 days. The earthquake on Saturday April 26 that measured 6.0 caused severe damages to nearby houses. However, during the 14-day period of sporadic earthquakes no deaths or injuries were reported.

Within the city there are 2,000 different plant species.

== See also ==
- Managua
- Fauna of Nicaragua
