= San Juan del Sur =

San Juan Del Sur
- Municipality
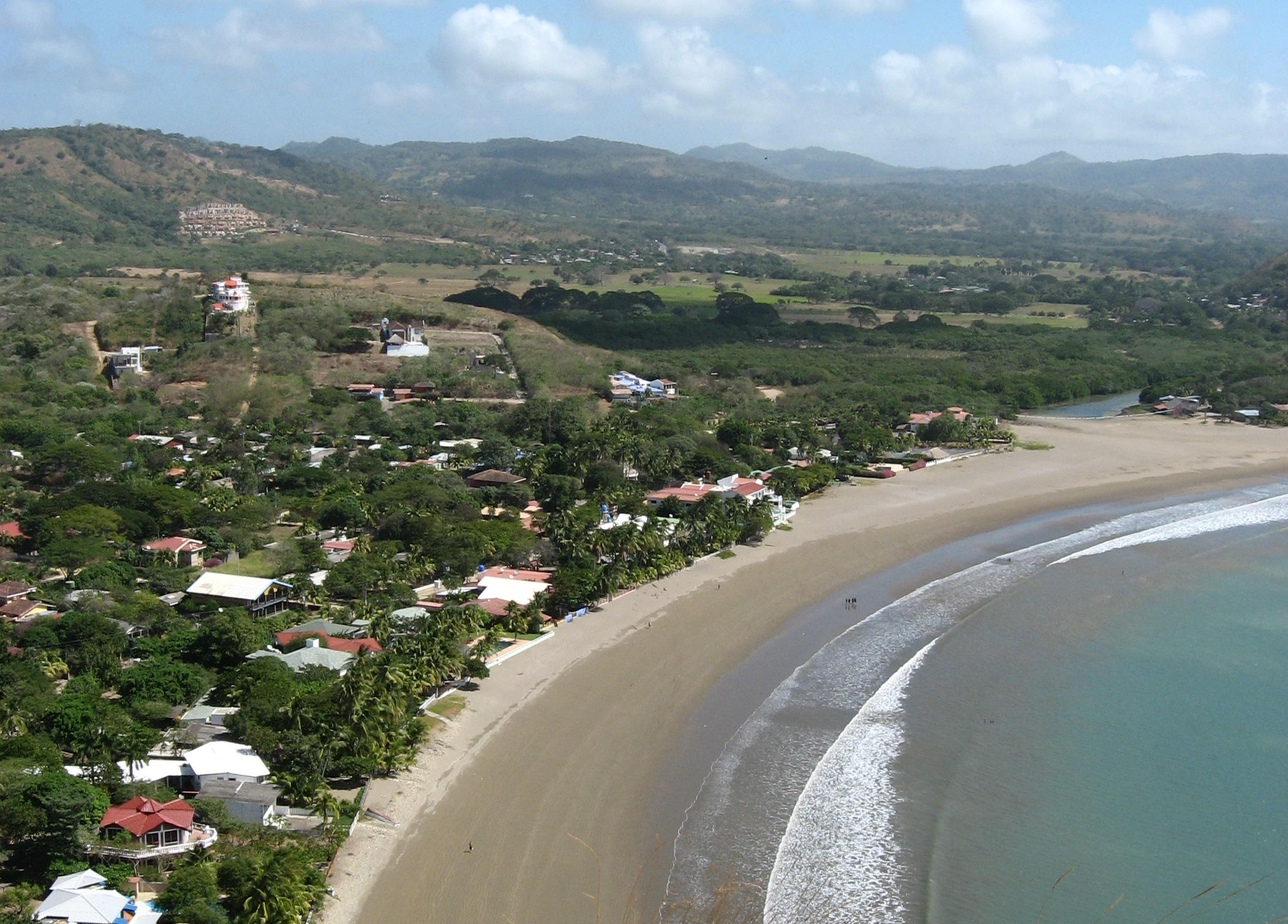
- The beach at San Juan del Sur taken from the Christ of the Mercy

- Location in Nicaragua
- Coordinates: 11°15′N 85°52′W
- Country: Nicaragua
- Department: Rivas Department
- Founded: 1851

Area
  - Municipality: 411 km^{2} (159 sq mi)
- Elevation: 92 m (302 ft)

Population (2005)
  - Municipality: 15,553
  - Urban: 7,220
- Time zone: UTC-6 (Nicaragua Standard Time)

San Juan del Sur Lighthouse
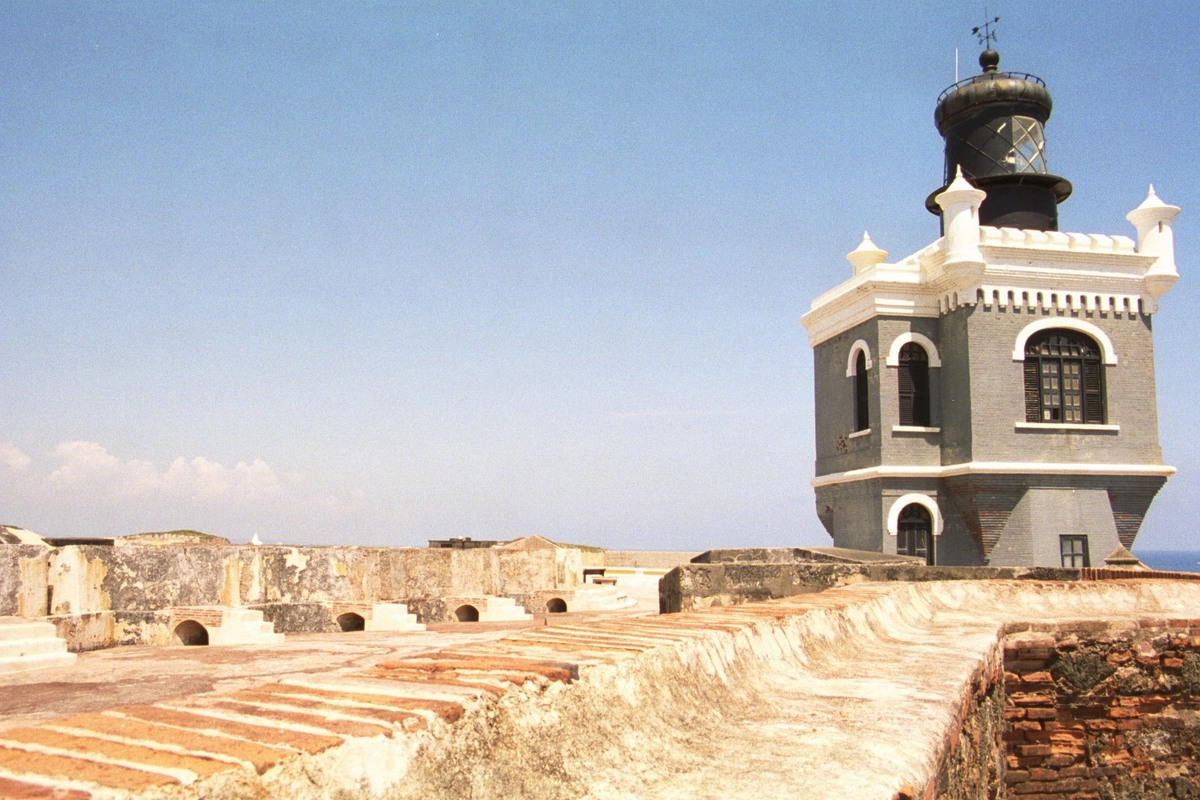
- Location: San Juan del Sur; Rivas Department
- Coordinates: 11°14′35.0″N 85°52′51.2″W

Tower
- Constructed: 1900 (first)
- Construction: masonry tower
- Height: 4.5 metres (15 ft)
- Shape: tapered cylindrical tower with balcony and light on a mast
- Markings: white tower
- Power source: solar power
- Operator: Aquatic Transport Directorate

Light
- Focal height: 30 metres (98 ft)
- Range: 16 nautical miles (30 km; 18 mi)
- Characteristic: Fl W 6s.

San Juan del Sur is a municipality and coastal town on the Pacific Ocean, in the Rivas department in southwest Nicaragua. It is located 140 kilometres (87 mi) south of Managua. San Juan del Sur is popular among surfers and is a vacation spot for many Nicaraguan families and foreign tourists.

Its population is approximately 15,553, consisting largely of families engaged in fishing, tourism or food and beverage industry and foreigners from the United States, Canada and Europe. While the local economy was, for many years, based on fishing and shipping, it has shifted towards tourism in the last 20 years. In October 2002, to mark the city's 150th anniversary, it was formally designated the "Port of San Juan del Sur" and a "Tourism City of Nicaragua."

San Juan del Sur, set beside a crescent-shaped bay, was a popular resting place for gold prospectors headed to California in the 1850s. Correspondingly, San Juan del Sur served as a hub for Cornelius Vanderbilt Lines.

A statue of the Christ of the Mercy sits above town on the northern end of the bay. The Mirador del Cristo de la Misericordia sits on one of the highest points on the bay and is one of the tallest Jesus statues in the world.

The town is near the site where Survivor: Nicaragua and Survivor: Redemption Island were filmed. Those seasons aired in 2010 and 2011, respectively. The 29th U.S. Survivor season, Survivor: San Juan del Sur (2014), was also filmed there, as was Season 30, Survivor: Worlds Apart, which aired in 2015. San Juan del Sur has become a hot spot for international surfing competition.

== Nicaragua Canal ==
San Juan del Sur is the port on the Pacific that has been focus of many historic and modern day Nicaragua Canal proposals because of its location on the narrow isthmus of Rivas between the Pacific Ocean and Lake Nicaragua.

== U.S. Intervention in San Juan del Sur ==
U.S. backed forces engaged in armed conflict in San Juan del Sur on March 7, 1984.

== The 1992 Nicaraguan tsunami ==
On September 2, 1992, a magnitude 7.0 earthquake off the central coast of Nicaragua generated a tsunami that devastated many communities along the Pacific Coast. Run-up values along the coast ranged from 2m in the north and south to up to 10m in some central locations. Run-up values in San Juan del Sur were approximately 5m. As a result of the tsunami an estimated 60% of homes in the community were destroyed, approximately 800 residents were displaced, and businesses and homes along the Malecón suffered severe damage.

== Geography ==
=== Climate ===
The climate for San Juan del Sur is a tropical savanna climate (Aw according to the Köppen climate classification), with constant and very warm temperatures throughout the year. The dry season lasts from December to May, with a substantial and heavy rainy season throughout the remainder of the year, with an average yearly rainfall of 1,710 millimetres or 67 inches.

Climate data for San Juan del Sur, Nicaragua
Month	Jan	Feb	Mar	Apr	May	Jun	Jul	Aug	Sep	Oct	Nov	Dec	Year
Mean daily maximum °C (°F)	26 (79)	28 (82)	29 (84)	28 (82)	28 (82)	26 (79)	27 (81)	28 (82)	27 (81)	27 (81)	27 (81)	27 (81)	27 (81)
Mean daily minimum °C (°F)	22 (72)	23 (73)	23 (73)	23 (73)	23 (73)	22 (72)	23 (73)	24 (75)	22 (72)	23 (73)	23 (73)	23 (73)	23 (73)
Average rainfall mm (inches)	15 (0.6)	2.5 (0.1)	0 (0)	10 (0.4)	130 (5.1)	270 (10.5)	180 (7.2)	200 (7.8)	300 (12)	460 (18)	110 (4.4)	28 (1.1)	1,705.5 (67.2)
Source: Weatherbase

== International relations ==
The Barrio Planta Project school is supported by a US-based 501(c)(3) organization.

=== Twin towns – Sister cities ===
San Juan del Sur is twinned with:

- Gießen, Germany
- (United States) Newton, Massachusetts, USA
- Sauda, Norway
- (United States) Virginia Beach, Virginia, USA

== Gallery ==
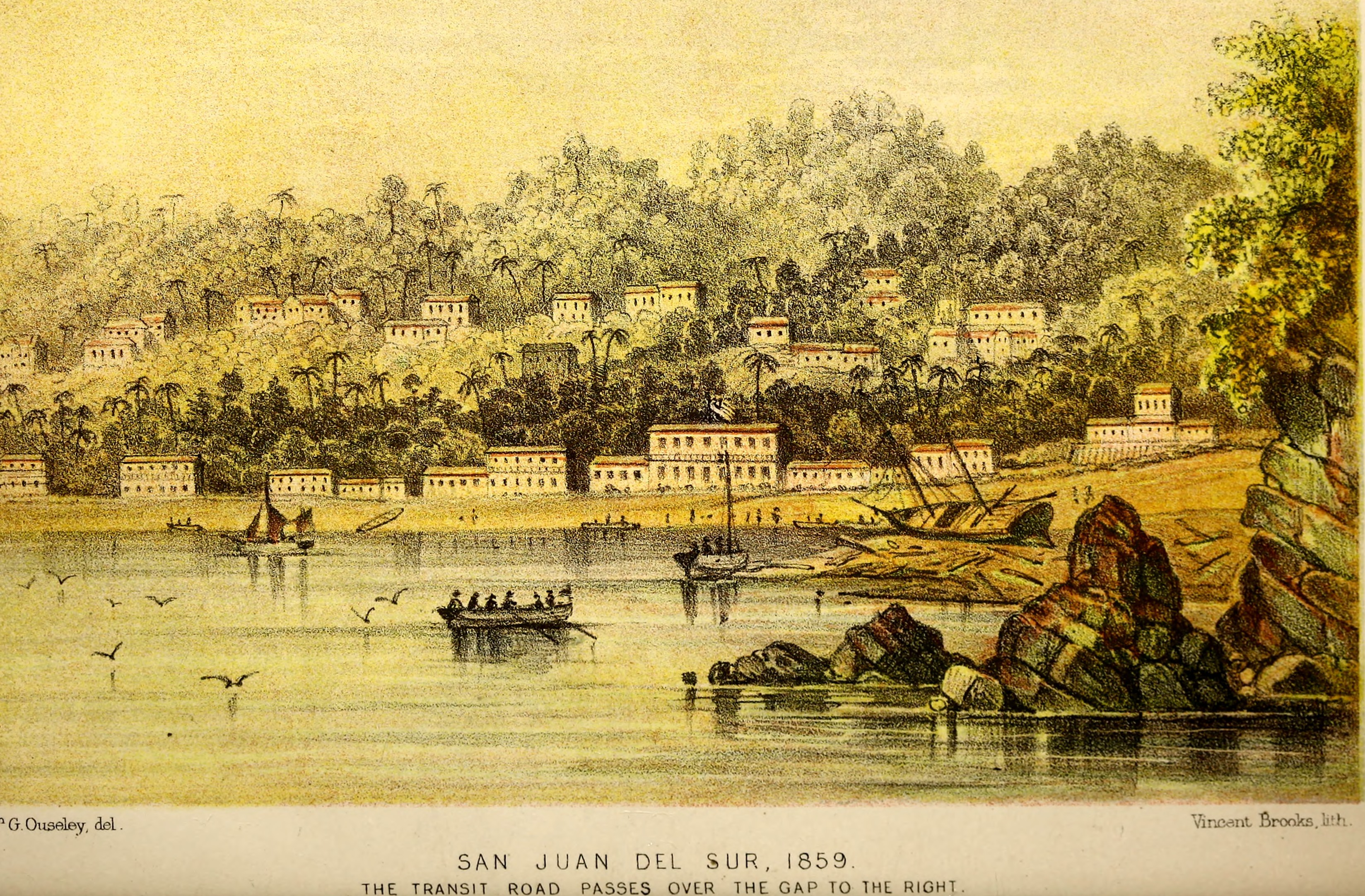
The city depicted in 1859 (lithograph by Vincent Brooks)

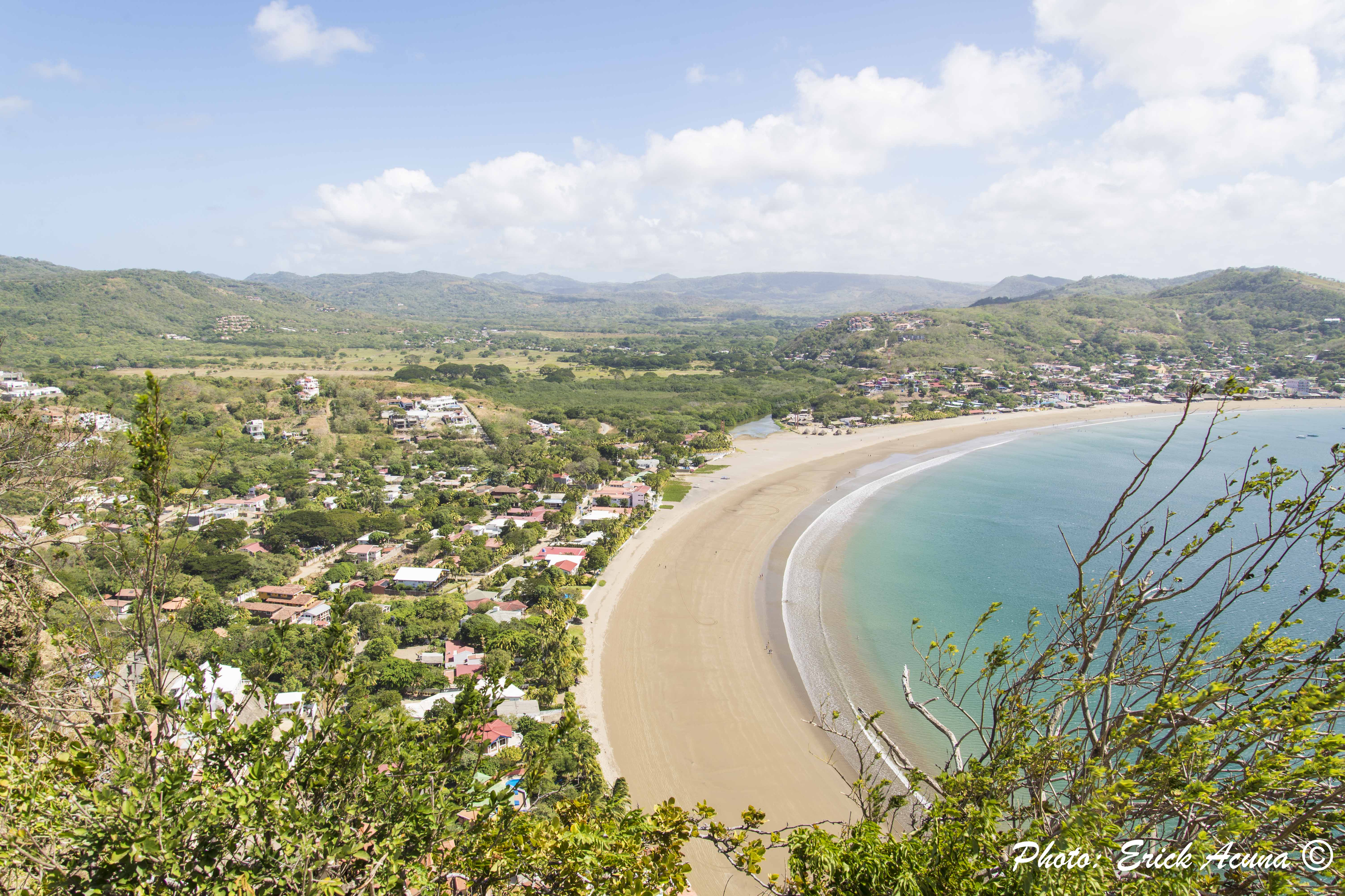
Image taken from the Christ of Mercy hill

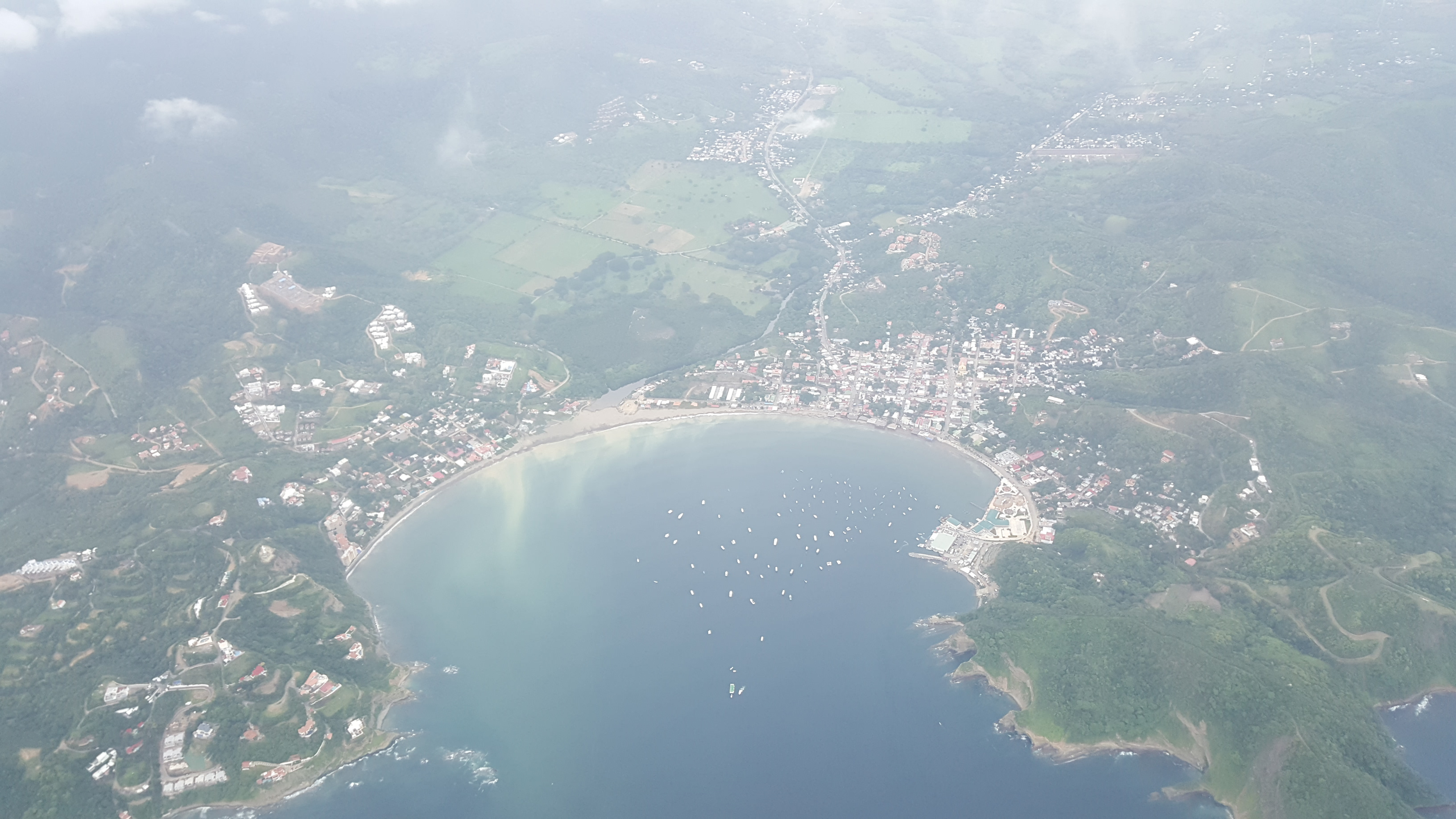
San Juan del Sur Bay, aerial view

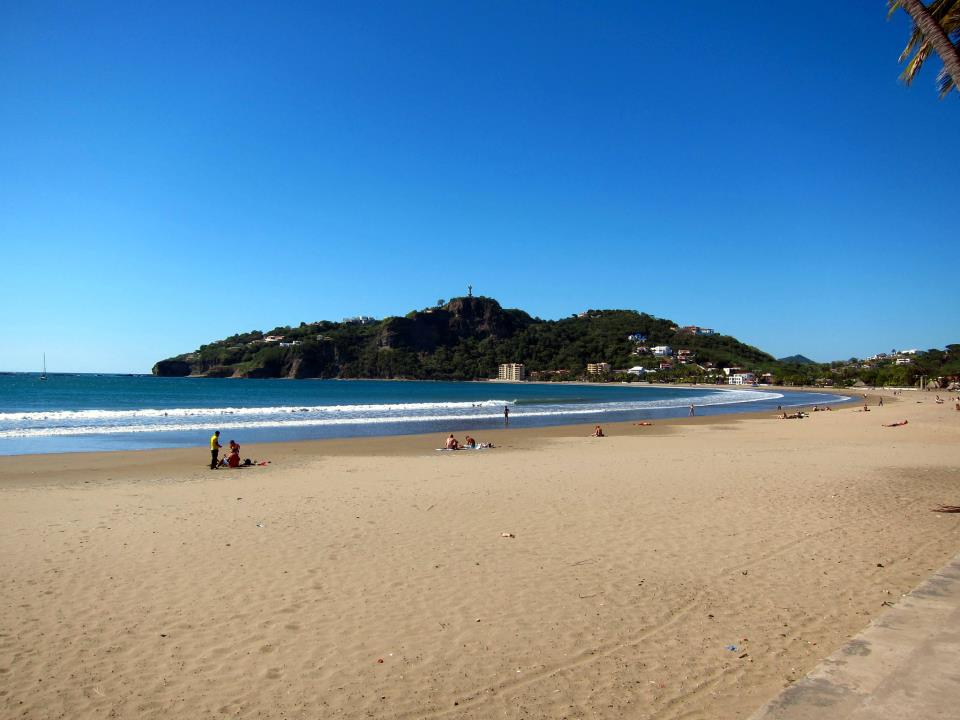
San Juan del Sur beach, and the hill with the Christ of Mercy atop

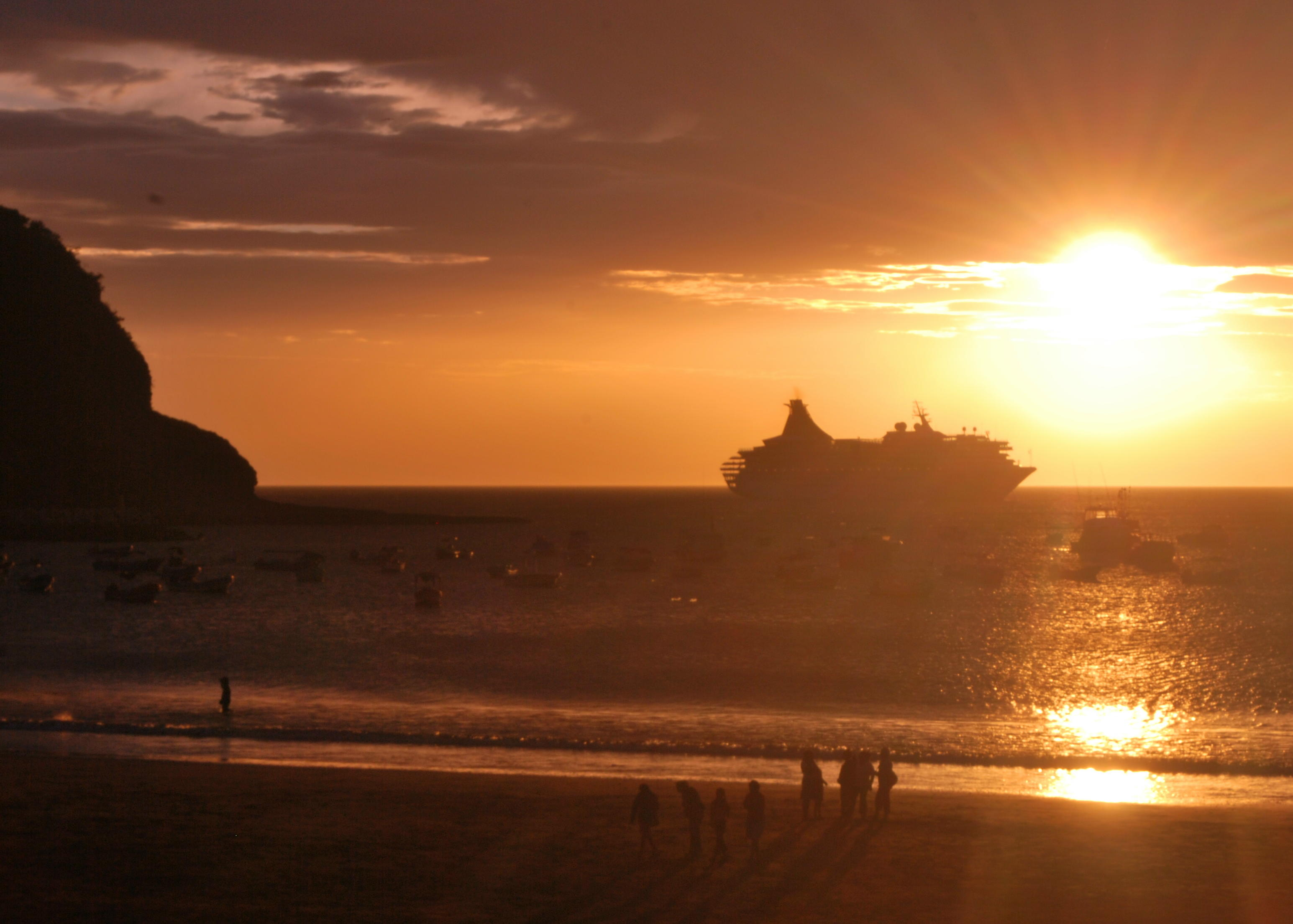
Sunset at San Juan del Sur bay

== See also ==
- List of lighthouses in Nicaragua
