= Nicaraguan Civil Aeronautics Institute =

Nicaraguan civil aviation agency

The Nicaraguan Civil Aeronautics Institute (INAC, from Spanish: Instituto Nicaragüense de Aeronáutica Civil) is the civil aviation authority of Nicaragua. Its headquarters are in Managua.

The Comisión Investigadora de Accidentes de Aviación of the INAC investigates aviation accidents and incidents.
