= VOR/DME =

Aircraft radio navigation station

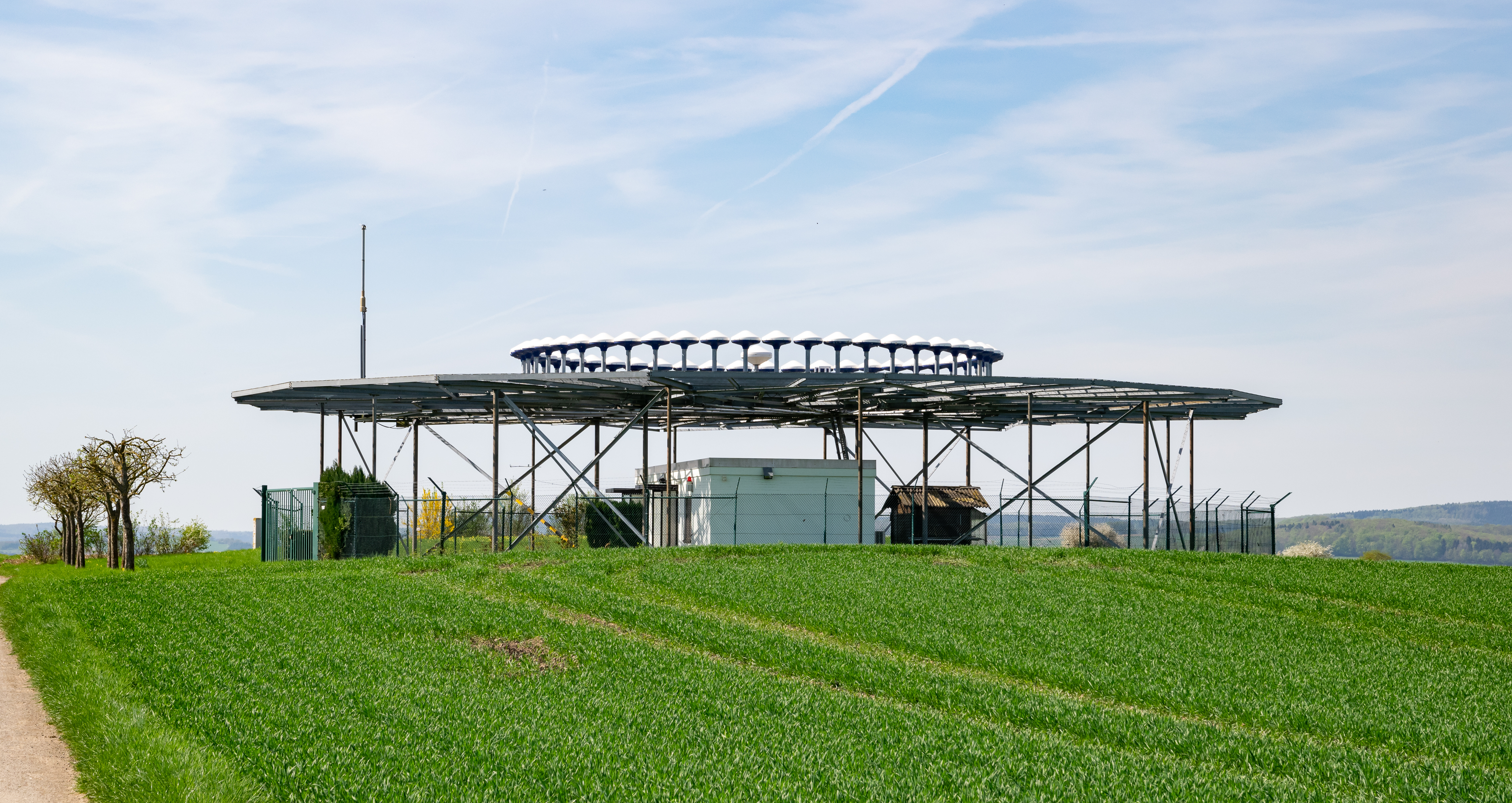
A VOR/DME ground station in Germany

In radio navigation, a VOR/DME is a radio beacon that combines a VHF omnidirectional range (VOR) with a distance-measuring equipment (DME). The VOR allows the receiver to measure its bearing to or from the beacon, while the DME provides the slant distance between the receiver and the station. Together, the two measurements allow the receiver to compute a position fix.

The VOR system was first introduced in the 1930s, but did not enter significant commercial use until the early 1950s. It became much more practical with the introduction of low-cost solid state receivers in the 1960s. DME was a modification of World War II-era navigation systems like Gee-H, and began development in 1946. Like VOR, it only became practical with the introduction of solid state receivers during the 1960s.

In 1948, the United States Congress directed civilian and military aviation to standardize on VOR/DME equipment. However, the military secretly developed a largely duplicate system called TACAN. The system was revealed in 1952, but work continued into 1955, when the redundancy of effort caused controversy. (Note: The first DME stations were installed on the airway system in 1952.) The following year an agreement was reached, where civilian operators would adopt the VORTAC system.

VOR/DME symbol used on aeronautical charts

During the mid-1960s, ICAO began the process of introducing a standardized radio navigation system for medium-area coverage on the order of a few hundred kilometres. This system would replace the older Low-frequency radio range and similar systems used to navigate over national ranges. A number of proposals were submitted, including ones based solely on angle measurements like VOR, solely on distance measures like DME, combinations, or systems that output a location directly, like Decca Navigator and Loran-C.

VOR/DME eventually won the standardization effort, due to a number of factors. One was that the direct measurement systems like Loran were generally much more expensive to implement (and would be into the 1980s) while Decca had problems with static interference from lightning strikes because of its low 70 to 129 kHz frequency. The choice of VOR/DME as a hybrid was due largely to it being easier to measure and then plot on a map. With VOR/DME, measurement from a single station reveals an angle and range, which can be easily drawn on a chart. Using a system based on two angles, as an example, requires two measurements at different frequencies (or using two radios) and then the angles plotted from both on a single chart which may be difficult in a cramped cockpit.

Eventually, the FAA began to integrate their VOR/DME facilities with stations based on the TACAN standard, and the stations are called VORTAC. Then, most aviation moved to GNSS and GPS satellite navigation, and only use these older systems as a backup.
