= Nicaragüense de Aviación =

Airline in Nicaragua, 1992–2004

NICA

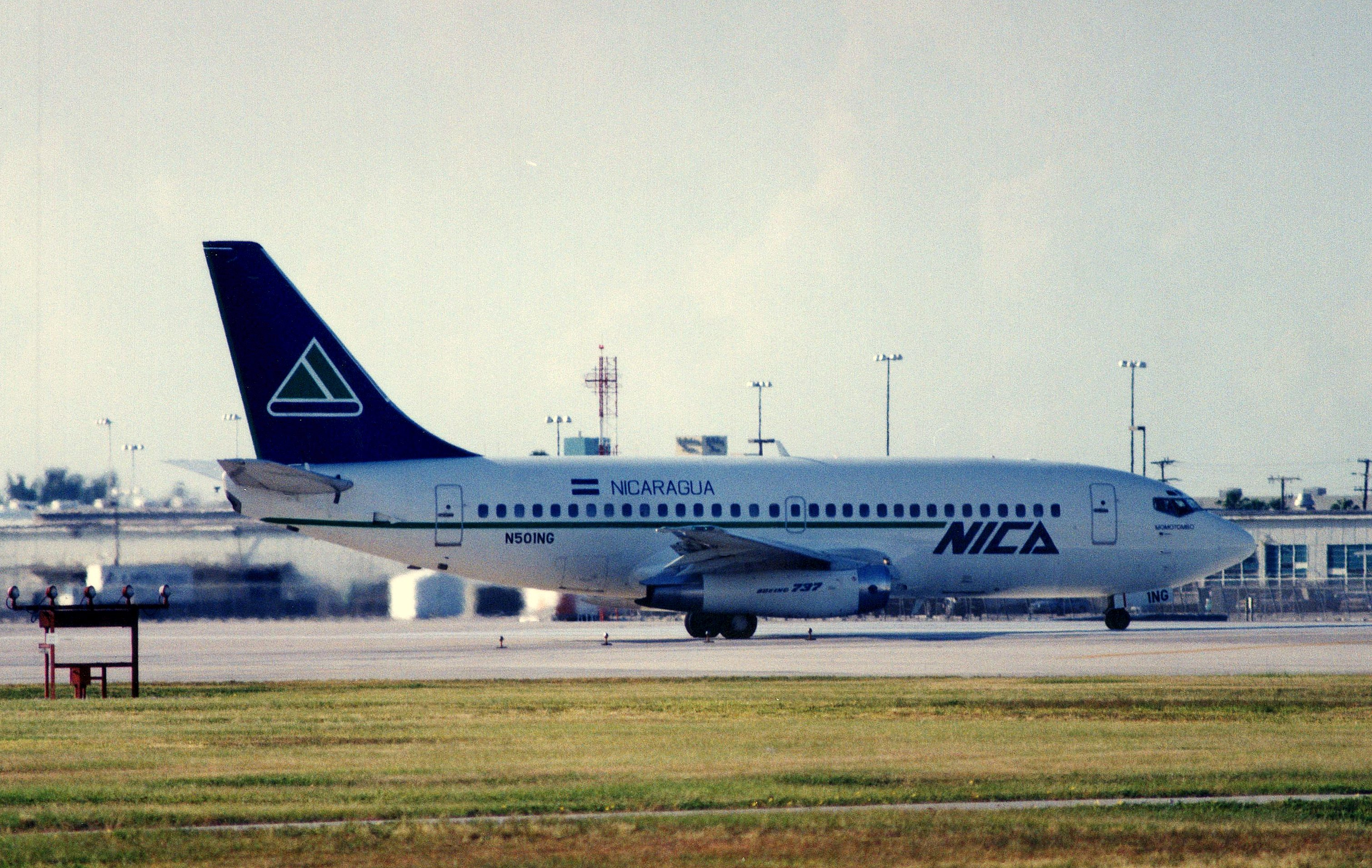
- Nicaragüense de Aviación Boeing 737-200 at Miami Airport, 1995
| IATA | ICAO | Call sign |
|---|---|---|
| 6Y | NIS | NICA |
- Founded: 1992
- Ceased operations: 2004 (Merged into TACA International Airlines)
- Hubs: Augusto C. Sandino International Airport
- Frequent-flyer program: Distancia
- Fleet size: 3
- Destinations: 9
- Parent company: Grupo TACA (49%)
- Headquarters: Managua, Nicaragua
- Website: www.taca.com (TACA)

Nicaragüense de Aviación (also known as NICA) was an airline based in Nicaragua. Its main hub was the Augusto C. Sandino International Airport. The commercial airline was a full associate member of the Grupo TACA alliance of El Salvador.

== History ==
NICA was founded in 1992 from the remains of Aeronica and commenced operations from Managua to Miami. In 1994, the Grupo TACA acquired 49% of NICA and reorganized the airline without government intervention.

In 2004, the airline ceased operations and merged into TACA International Airlines. Its domestic flights were given to Nicaragua's domestic flag carrier, La Costeña, an airline that joined the TACA Regional alliance.

== Destinations ==
Costa Rica

- San José (Juan Santamaría International Airport)

El Salvador

- San Salvador (El Salvador International Airport)

Guatemala

- Guatemala City (La Aurora International Airport)

Nicaragua

- Managua (Augusto C. Sandino International Airport) Hub
- Bluefields (Bluefields Airport)
- Puerto Cabezas (Puerto Cabezas Airport)
- Corn Island (Corn Island Airport)

Panama

- Panama City (Tocumen International Airport)

United States

- Miami (Miami International Airport)

== Fleet ==
NICA formerly operated the following aircraft:

- 2 Boeing 737-200
- 1 CASA C-212 Aviocar

== See also ==
- List of defunct airlines of Nicaragua
