= List of airlines of Nicaragua =

This is a list of airlines operating in Nicaragua.

== Active ==
Airline	Image	IATA	ICAO	Callsign	Founded	Notes
La Costeña		LC	NIS	LACOSTEÑA	1991	

== Defunct ==
Airline	Image	IATA	ICAO	Callsign	Founded	Ceased operations	Notes
Aeronica		NI	ANI	AERONICA	1981	1992	
Aerosegovia			SGV	SEGOVIA	1994	2003	
Aero Charter Cargo					2001	2001	
Air Nicaragua					2011	2011	Never launched
Atlantic Airlines			AYN	ATLANTIC NICARAGUA	1997	2007	
Central American Air Lines		GW			1990	1994	
Flota Aérea Nicaragüense				FANSA	1950	1950	Acquired by LANICA
LAB - Linea Aérea Borinquen					1960	1962	
LANICA		NI		LANICA	1945	1981	
Nicaragua Airways			NAR		2014	2014	Never launched
Nicaragüense de Aviación		6Y	NIS	NICA	1992	2004	Merged into TACA International Airlines
TACA de Nicaragua					1935	1946	

== See also ==
- List of airlines of the Americas
