= Air Nicaragua =

Proposed Nicaraguan Airline

- Founded: February 22, 2011
- Hubs: Augusto C. Sandino International Airport
- Parent company: Blue Panorama Airlines
- Headquarters: Managua, Nicaragua
- Key people: Adolfo Membreno

Air Nicaragua was a proposed airline that was meant to be the national flag carrier of Nicaragua. Its main base was Augusto C. Sandino International Airport.

It would've been the first time in 20 years that Nicaragua would have a national flag carrier, after Aeronica ceased operations in 1991. Since then, the flag carrier status was awarded to Nicaragüense de Aviación, which operated flights under the TACA Airlines brand. Several airlines had tried to become the Nicaraguan flag carrier like Central American Air Lines and Servicios Aereas Nicaragua, but both of these failed.

Ch-aviation stated that the airline has not launched operations.

== See also ==
- List of airlines of Nicaragua
