= SGV =

SGV may refer to:

- Segovia, city in Spain.
- SGV (automobile), an early American automobile manufacturer
- San Gabriel Valley, one of the principal valleys of Southern California, United States
- Sauerländischer Gebirgsverein, an association for hiking in Germany
- Schifffahrtsgesellschaft des Vierwaldstättersees, an operator of passenger boats on Lake Lucerne, Switzerland
- SyCip Gorres Velayo & Co., a Philippine multidisciplinary professional services firm
- Soil guideline value
- Aerosegovia, Nicaraguan charter airline (ICAO code)
- Shikand-gumanig Vizar, a Zoroastrian theology book
- Swiss Laboratory Animal Science Association, see Life Sciences Switzerland
