= John F. Kennedy Boulevard =

John F. Kennedy Boulevard or Kennedy Boulevard may refer to:

- John F. Kennedy Boulevard (Tampa, Florida), a major east–west corridor in Tampa, Florida
- John F. Kennedy Boulevard (Houston, Texas), a major north-south boulevard in Houston, Texas.
- County Route 501 (New Jersey) in Hudson County, New Jersey
- Boulevard East in North Hudson, New Jersey
- County Route 625 (Cape May County, New Jersey) in Sea Isle City, New Jersey
- A section of westbound Pennsylvania Route 3 in Center City, Philadelphia
- The main thoroughfare in Managua, Nicaragua, which is also known as Carretera Norte.

== See also ==
- John F. Kennedy Boulevard Bridge, built in 1959 and reconstructed 2009 by the Pennsylvania Department of Transportation
- John F. Kennedy Memorial Highway (disambiguation)
