= 1982 IAI Arava 201 crash =

1982 aviation accident in Nicaragua

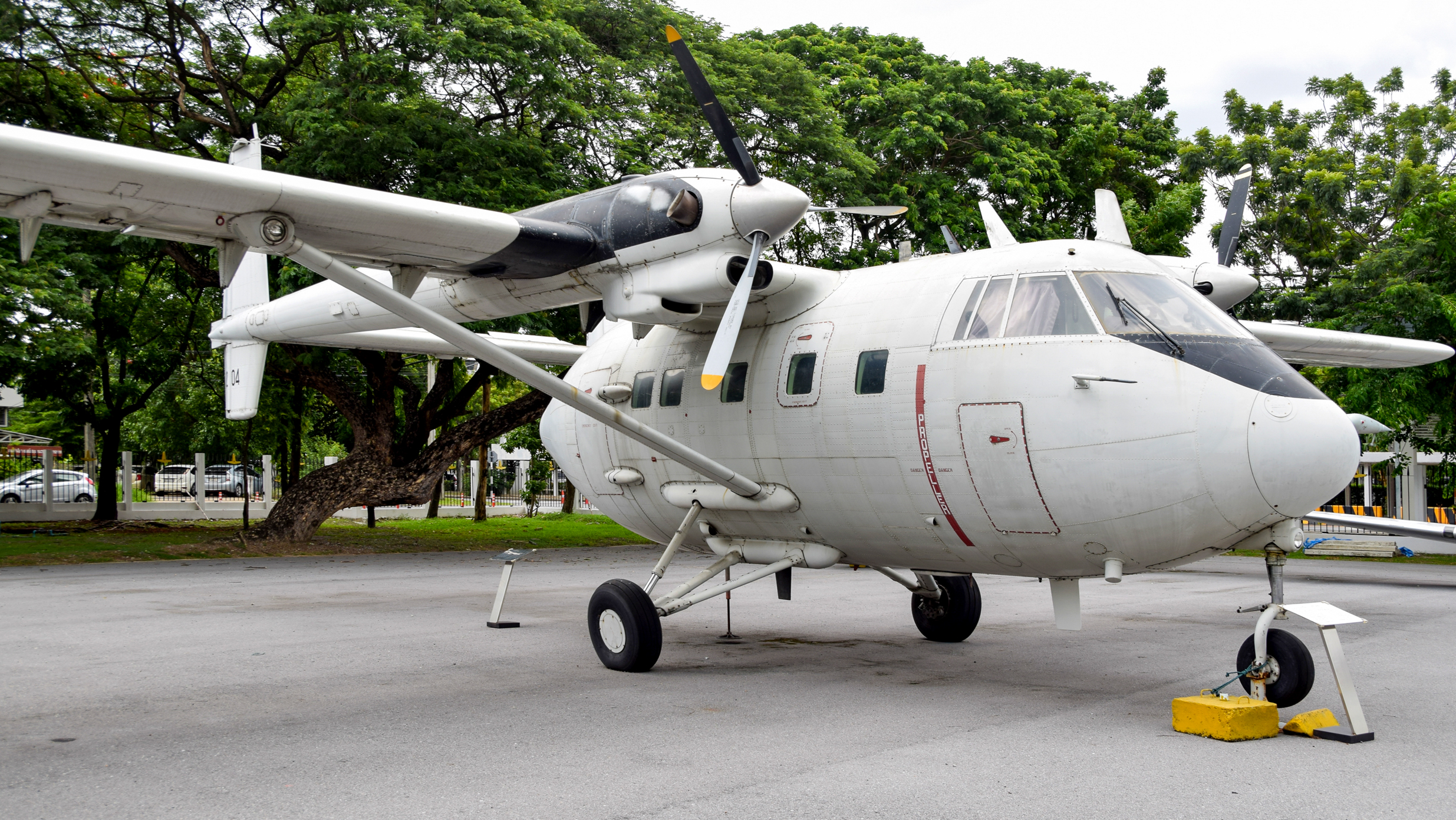
- An IAI Arava 201, similar to the one involved

Accident
- Date: 14 August 1982
- Summary: Engine failure on takeoff leading to loss of control
- Site: 300 yards from El Rodeo, near Augusto C. Sandino International Airport, Managua, Nicaragua; 12°8′0″N 86°10′0″W

Aircraft
- Aircraft type: IAI Arava 201
- Operator: Fuerza Aérea Sandinista
- Registration: 223
- Flight origin: Augusto C. Sandino International Airport
- Occupants: 22
- Passengers: 20
- Crew: 2
- Fatalities: 20
- Injuries: 2
- Survivors: 2

On 14 August 1982, an IAI Arava 201 operated by the Nicaraguan Air Force crashed shortly after takeoff from Augusto C. Sandino International Airport in Managua, Nicaragua. The aircraft went down near the airport and resulted in the deaths of 20 of the 22 people on board.

Among the causualties were former Sandinista guerrilla commander Marcos Somarriba, who served as the Deputy Minister for Development and two Cuban advisers to the National Census Institute.

The accident was at the time the worst Sandinista air force accident.

== Background ==
The aircraft was an Israeli-built twin-engine IAI Arava used for military transport. It was operated by the Fuerza Aérea Sandinista and was reportedly carrying military personnel and medical supplies on a mission to the northern part of the country.

There were two crewmembers on board. The pilot was Lt. Henry Tablada Ruiz and co-pilot Abdul Sirkin Gomez.

The incident occurred in the context of ongoing military operations in Zelaya Norte, where increased use of aviation had been deemed necessary. Authorities emphasized that flight missions were carried out under difficult conditions due to the demands of the conflict.

=== Flight summary ===
The aircraft took off from Managua in the morning at 8:45am-8:50am and crashed shortly after departure while in its initial climb. It titled to the left and reportedly banked and went down approximately 150 metres from the runway, 300 yards from El Rodeo, a residential area close to Augusto C. Sandino International Airport.

Witnesses reported that pilot did everything he could to avoid a El Rodeao. That went fairly well while the aircraft struck houses before exploding. Two occupants survived the initial crash, while the remaining passengers and crew were killed.

=== Cause ===
The cause of the crash according to the official communique was engine failure. According to Sandinista authorities, the accident was caused by a mechanical failure that led to loss of control of the aircraft. Officials attributed the failure to a lack of spare parts, limited technical resources, and broader economic constraints affecting aircraft maintenance during the period.

== Victims ==
Early reports stated that 19 of the 20 occupants died, with the one survivor being seriously injured. The survivor was Carlos Rodriguez, who remained in critical condition in the hospital. Other reports stated two people were hospitalized with serious injuries, or that 20 people were killed.

Onboard was the 80-19 Reserve Infantry Battalion in Granada. Among those killed was former Sandinista guerrilla commander Marcos Somarriba, who served as the Deputy Minister for Development. He was regarded an important figure within the Sandinista movement and was a representative of the Nicaraguan interior ministry for Zelaya Norte; the site were recently before the accident anti-Sandinista attacks took place. Also on board were Pablo Batista Vigil and Mireya Nunez, two Cuban advisers to the National Census Institute and Costa Rican adviser Flor del Carmen Madrigal.

== Aftermath ==
=== Government response ===
A state ceremony was held at the Ministry of the Interior in Managua, where the victims were honored posthumously. Members of the Sandinista leadership, military officials, and government representatives participated in guard of honor ceremonies.

Several of the deceased were posthumously promoted in rank. Marcos Somarriba was awarded the Order of Carlos Fonseca, one of the highest honors granted by the Sandinista National Liberation Front (FSLN), in recognition of his role in the revolutionary movement.

The death of the international advisers, Cuban nationals Mireya Núñez and Pablo Batista, and Costa Rican adviser Flor del Carmen Madrigal were publicly acknowledged by Nicaraguan authorities as symbols of international solidarity with the Sandinista government.

=== Legacy ===
In subsequent years, Somarriba was commemorated as a prominent figure within the Sandinista movement. In 2011, a National Police district in Managua was named in his honor, and a bust was unveiled to recognize his contributions to the development of the institution.
