= John F. Kennedy Memorial Highway =

John F. Kennedy Memorial Highway or JFK Memorial Highway may refer to:

- John F. Kennedy Memorial Highway (Maryland), a section of Interstate 95 in Maryland
- Delaware Turnpike, a tolled section of Interstate 95 in Delaware
- Massachusetts Route 18, a continuation of John F. Kennedy Memorial Highway in New Bedford, Massachusetts
- Interstate 25 in Colorado, a section of Interstate 25 in Pueblo County

== See also ==
- John F. Kennedy Boulevard (disambiguation)
- John F. Kennedy Expressway, a major expressway in Chicago, Illinois
- John F. Kennedy Memorial Bridge, a bridge that crosses the Ohio River between Kentucky and Indiana
- John F. Kennedy Memorial Causeway, a bridge located in Corpus Christi, Texas
