= Bluefields Airport =

Airport in Bluefields, Nicaragua

Bluefields International Airport
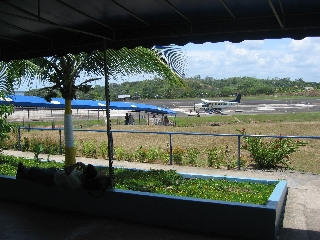
- IATA: BEF; ICAO: MNBL

Summary
- Airport type: Military/Public
- Operator: EAAI
- Serves: Bluefields, Nicaragua
- Hub for: La Costeña
- Elevation AMSL: 41 ft / 12 m
- Coordinates: 11°59′27″N 83°46′27″W

Map
- Location in Nicaragua

Runways
Direction	Length		Surface
Direction	m	ft	Surface
05/23	2,019	6,624	Asphalt
- Source: WAD GCM Google Maps

Bluefields International Airport (IATA: BEF, ICAO: MNBL) is an airport serving Bluefields, a harbor city in the South Caribbean Coast Autonomous Region of Nicaragua. It is the busiest airport in the Caribbean coast of Nicaragua.

A new terminal was opened recently and extension of the runway is planned. Currently, the airport serves only domestic and small international destinations, but plans are to make it international in the future. Taxicab and bus service are available.

The airport is just south of the city on the Bluefields Bay shore. North approach and departure are over the water. The runway length includes a 175 metres (574 ft) displaced threshold on Runway 23.

The Bluefields VOR/DME (ident: BLU) is located on the airfield.

== Airlines and destinations ==
Airlines	Destinations
La Costeña	Corn Island, Managua, Puerto Cabezas

== Accidents and incidents ==
- On 10 May 1982, two hijackers demanded a Curtiss-Wright C-46 Commando of Aeronica to leave its Bluefields-Corn Island route and land in Costa Rica instead. The pilots obeyed and landed at Limón International Airport in Costa Rica, where the perpetrators surrendered.
- On July 20, 1999, a Cessna Grand Caravan operating as La Costeña flight 046 from Managua to Bluefields crashed into a remote hillside 50 km west of Bluefields when it descended prematurely, killing all 16 on board.
- On December 19, 2007 a Short 360 of La Costeña Airlines struck a tire when attempting takeoff from Bluefields Airport. No-one was hurt.

== See also ==
- List of airports in Nicaragua
- Transport in Nicaragua
