= Corn Island Airport =

Airport in Great Corn Island, Nicaragua

Corn Island International Airport
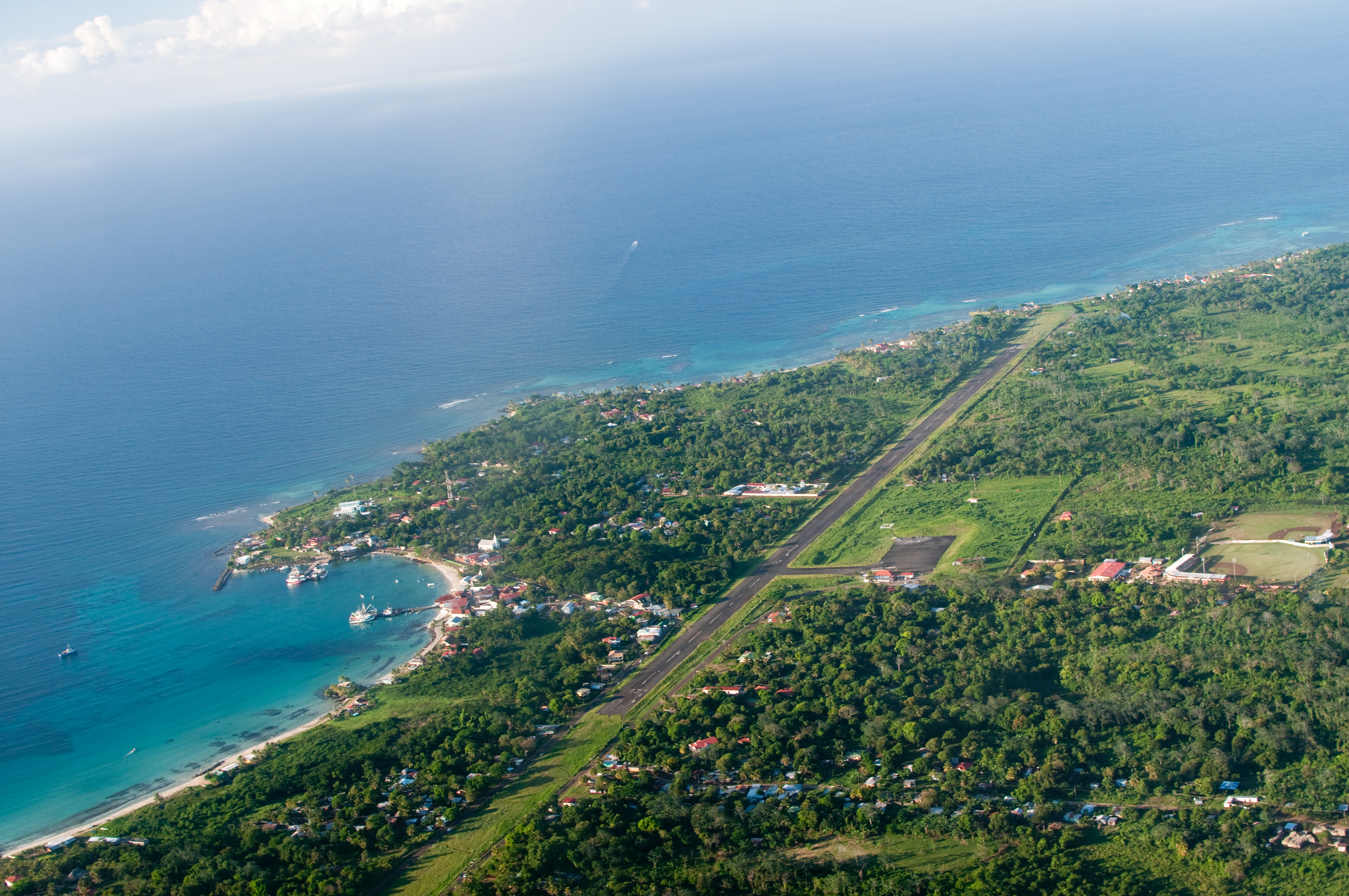
- IATA: RNI; ICAO: MNCI

Summary
- Airport type: Military/public
- Owner: Republic of Nicaragua
- Operator: EAAI
- Serves: Great Corn Island
- Location: Great Corn Island
- Focus city for: La Costeña
- Elevation AMSL: 18 ft (5.5 m)
- Coordinates: 12°10′17″N 83°03′38″W

Map
- Location in Nicaragua

Runways
Direction	Length		Surface
Direction	m	ft	Surface
03/21	1,900	6,234	Asphalt
- Source: GCM, Google Maps

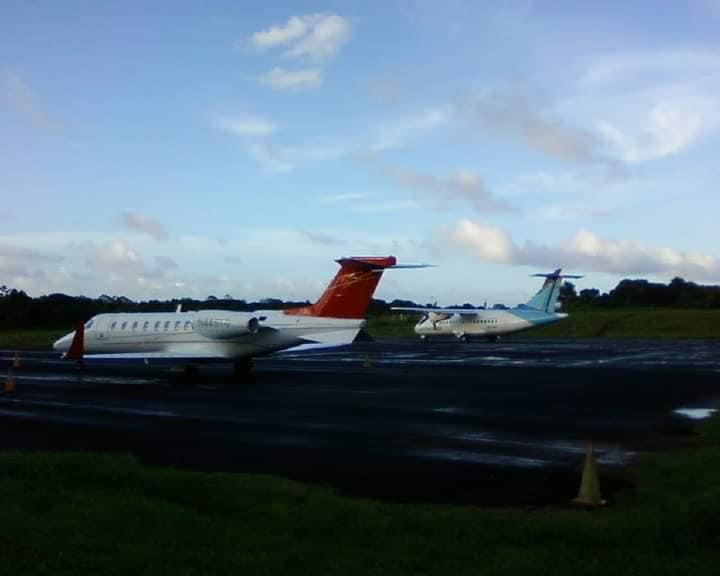
An Learjet 45 of Bank of Utah Trustee and an ATR 42-320 of La Costeña Airlines at Corn Island Airport

Corn Island International Airport (IATA: RNI, ICAO: MNCI) is a civil-military public international airport that serves Great Corn Island in the South Caribbean Coast Autonomous Region of Nicaragua and located in the island's downtown area, known locally as Brig Bay. The airport is managed by the state-run Administrative Company of International Airports, more commonly known as the EAAI, given its Spanish name, the Empresa Administradora de Aeropuertos Internacionales.

The Bluefields NDB (ident: CIS) is located at the airport.

The runway at the airport is 6,234 ft (1,900 m) long, and is at an elevation of 18 ft (5.5 m) above sea level.

== Expansion ==
=== 2011-2013 expansion ===
An expansion program was carried out between 2011 and 2013, which extended the runway from 4,750 feet (1,450 m) to 6,234 feet (1900 m). The runway was resurfaced and lighting systems were upgraded. The terminal building was also renovated, including improvements to security screening, passenger facilities, and parking infrastructure. The extension increased the airport's operational capacity, allowing it to accommodate larger regional aircraft.

== Airlines and destinations ==
Airlines	Destinations
La Costeña	Managua, Bluefields

== Gallery ==
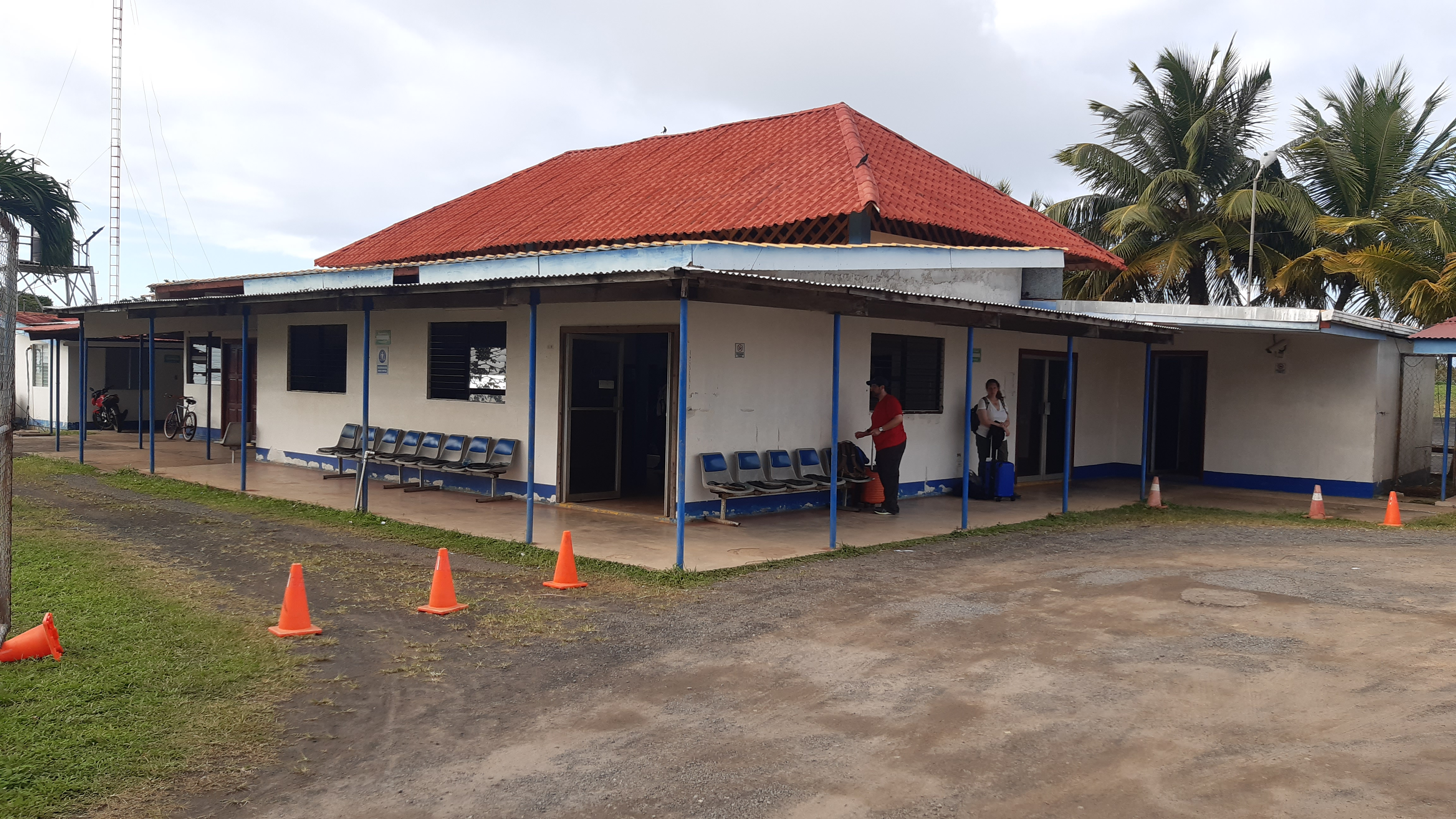
Terminal building

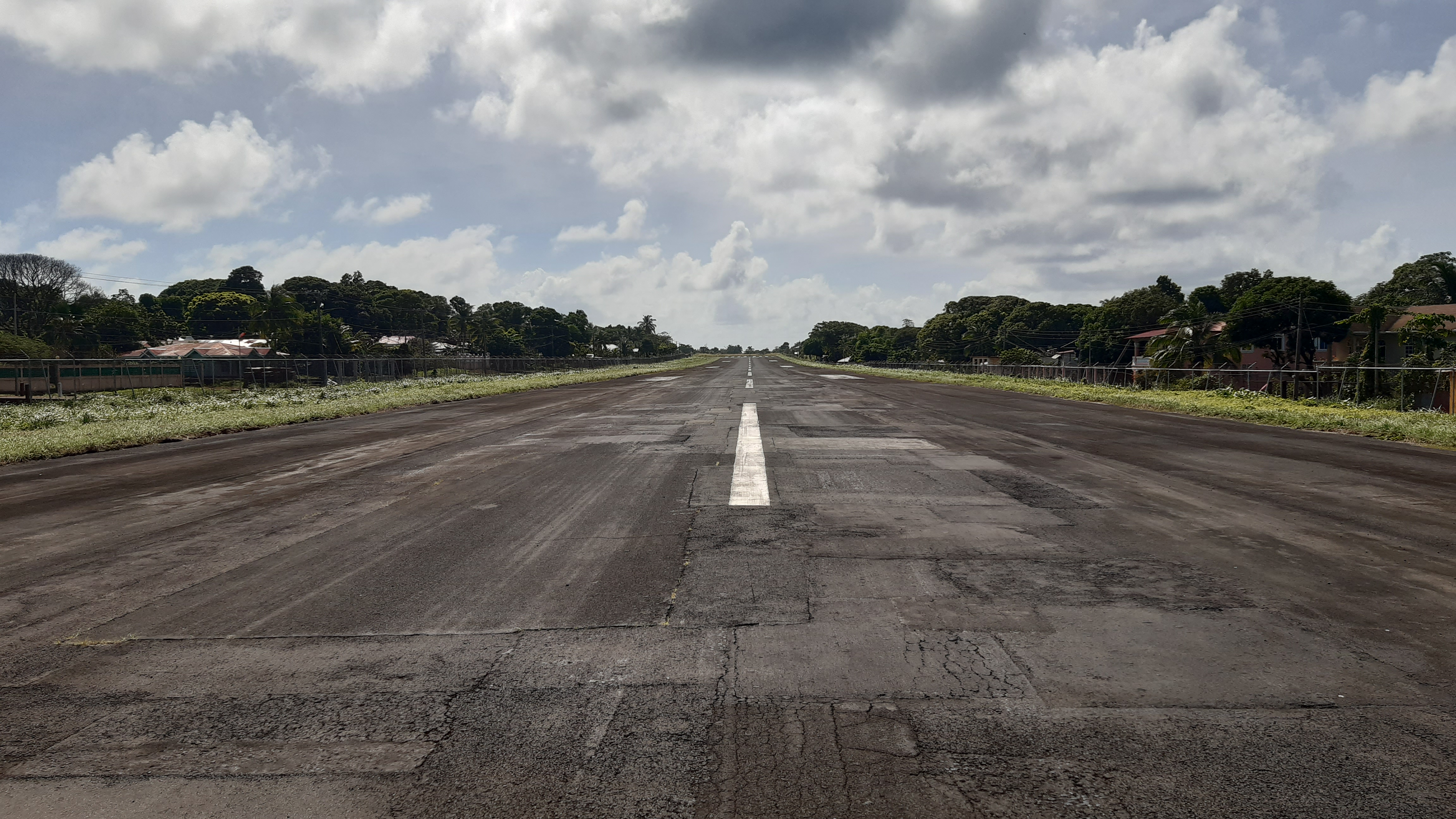
Runway (looking south west)

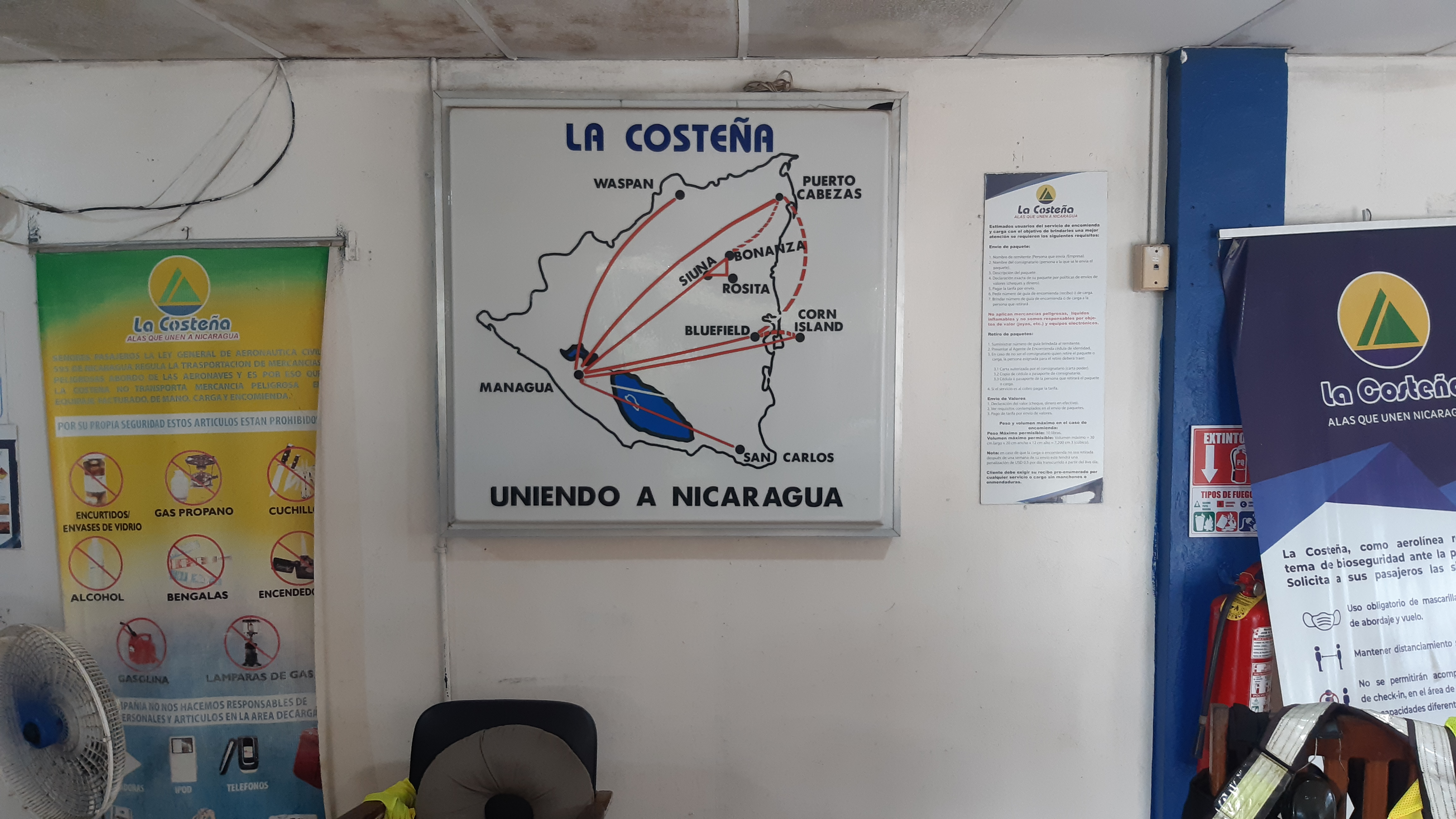
Map of domestic routes

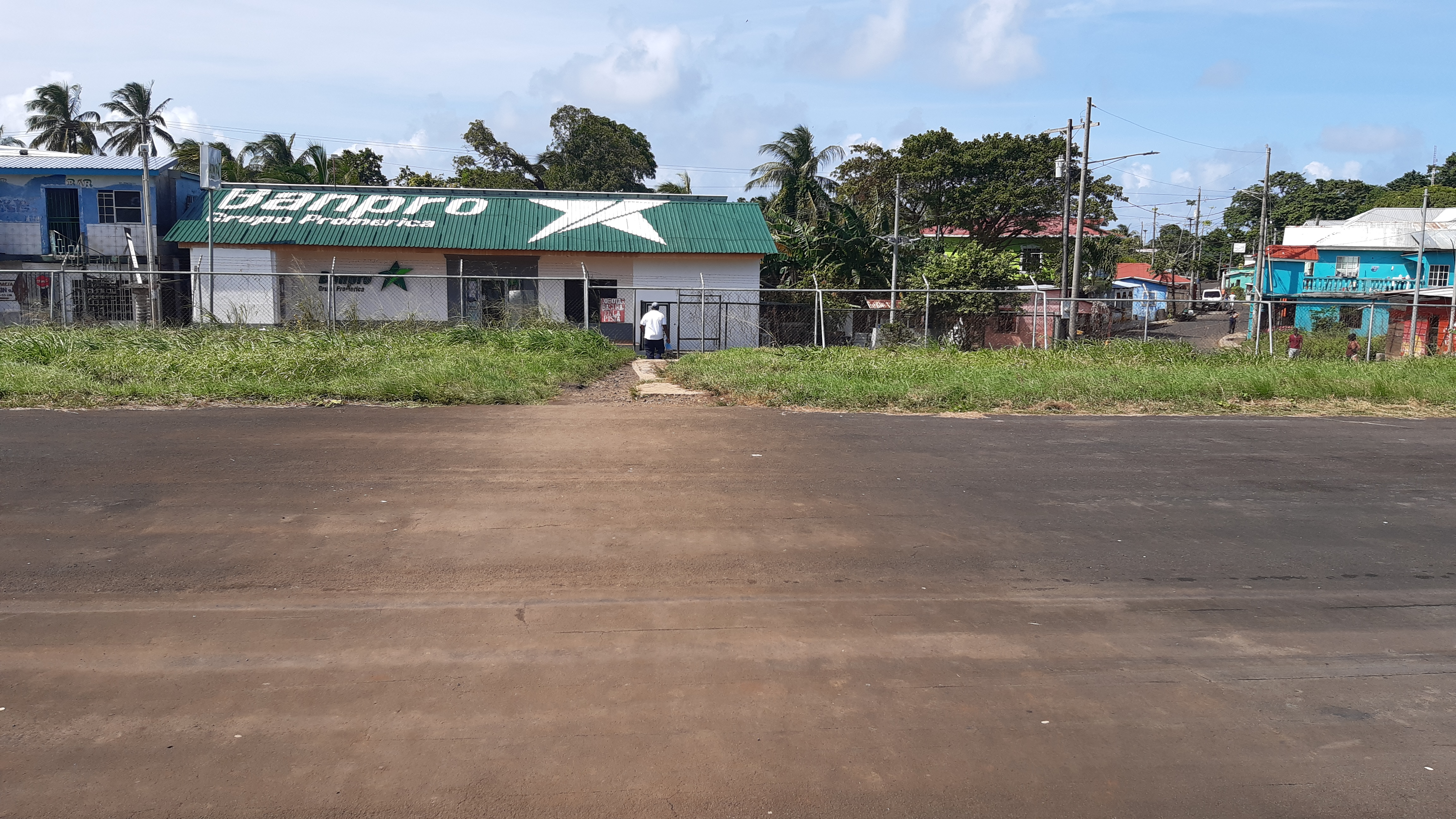
When safe, pedestrians can cross the runway by foot. Access is by unlocked gate.

== See also ==
- List of airports in Nicaragua
- Transport in Nicaragua
