= Aerosegovia =

Nicaraguan Airline

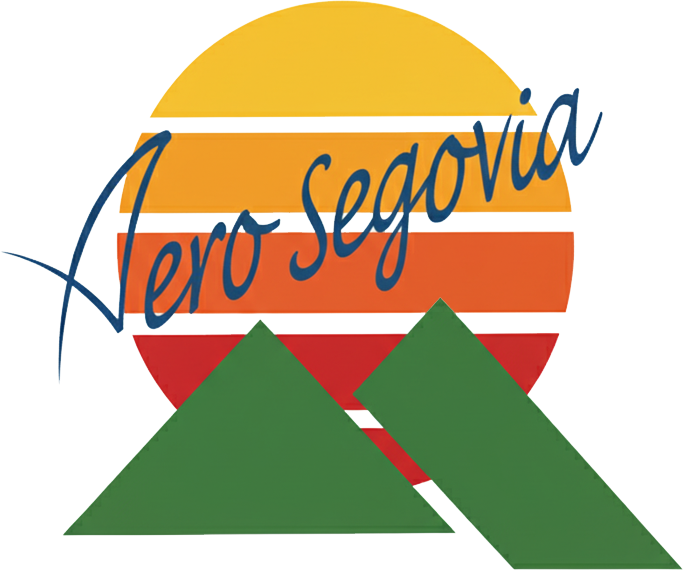
IATA	ICAO	Call sign
-	SGV	-
- Founded: 1994
- Ceased operations: March 2003
- Hubs: Augusto C. Sandino International Airport
- Fleet size: 3
- Destinations: 6
- Headquarters: Managua, Nicaragua

Aerosegovia was a charter airline based in Managua, Nicaragua that was formed with the assistance from Aero Caribbean. The airline ceased operations in March 2003 after the Nicaraguan Civil Aeronautics agency revoked the operating license due to lack of spare parts and other irregularities.

== Services ==
Aerosegovia flew daily flights from Managua to:

- Bluefields
- Puerto Cabezas
- Corn Island

In 1999 it operated a route from Managua to Tegucigalpa (Honduras) and on to Havana (Cuba), then the flight returned to Managua through Tegucigalpa.

== Fleet ==
Aerosegovia operated the following aircraft:

- 1 Antonov An-32 (VN-CBV)
- 1 Antonov An-26B (YN-CGC)
- 1 Antonov An-24B (NV-CGD)
