= Puerto Cabezas Airport =

- IATA: PUZ; ICAO: MNPC

Summary
- Airport type: Military/Public
- Operator: Republic of Nicaragua
- Location: Puerto Cabezas, North Caribbean Coast Autonomous Region
- Focus city for: La Costeña
- Elevation AMSL: 69 ft / 21 m
- Coordinates: 14°02′15″N 83°23′12″W

Map
- Location in Nicaragua

Runways
Direction	Length		Surface
Direction	m	ft	Surface
09/27	2,472	8,110	Asphalt
- Source: WAD SkyVector

Puerto Cabezas Airport (IATA: PUZ, ICAO: MNPC) is an airport serving Puerto Cabezas, North Caribbean Coast Autonomous Region. It is located approximately one hour from Managua by aircraft. Operated by the state of Nicaragua, it mainly serves the city of Puerto Cabezas and Bluefields located close to the northeast corner of the country.

== Improvement plans ==
There are plans to make the airport an international airport. The Airport Management Authority of Nicaragua has drawn up plans for improving the paved areas, taxiways, ramps, and an air terminal.

The new air terminal has a total area of 477 m^{2} (5,130 sq ft) and a 2,400 square metres (0.6 acres) parking lot for 30 vehicles. The terminal facilities are modern and air-conditioned. Immigration and customs services are also provided, but must be coordinated by the respective authorities.

== Transport links ==
The airport is approximately one kilometre north of the city center, and there are taxis, buses, and other forms of transportation available.

== Airlines and destinations ==
Airlines	Destinations
La Costeña	Bluefields, Managua

== See also ==
- Transport in Nicaragua
- List of airports in Nicaragua
