= United States embargo against Nicaragua =

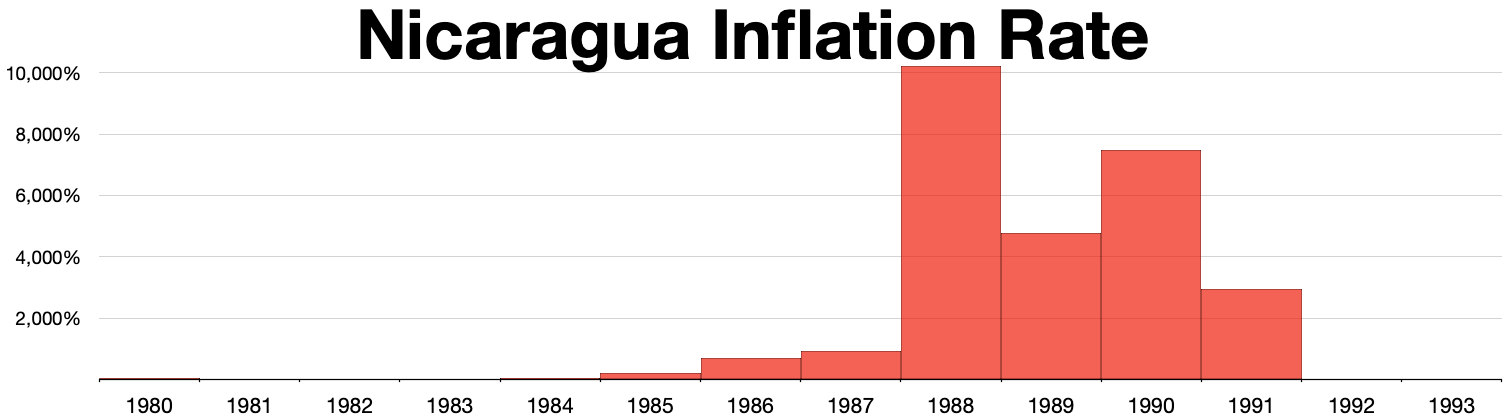
Nicaragua inflation 1980 -1993

The United States embargo against Nicaragua was declared by then-U.S. President Ronald Reagan on May 1, 1985, and prohibited all trade between the U.S. and Nicaragua. In a strategy similar to the embargo against Cuba, it was intended to undermine the Sandinista government which came to power in 1979 and was imposed again in 2018.

== Embargo ==
The embargo both forbade American products from entering Nicaragua (with exceptions for medicine and other humanitarian goods) and Nicaraguan products from entering the United States. It further banned all Nicaraguan ships from landing in any U.S. port or planes from landing on U.S. soil.

Ronald Reagan, on the day he declared the embargo, stated: "I, Ronald Reagan, President of the United States of America, find that the policies and actions of the Government of Nicaragua constitute an unusual and extraordinary threat to the national security and foreign policy of the United States and hereby declare a national emergency to deal with that threat." Reagan made four demands against Nicaragua during his embargo announcement:

1. To "halt its export of armed insurrection, terrorism, and subversion in neighboring countries."
2. To end its military ties to Cuba and the Soviet Union
3. To cease its "massive arms buildup"
4. To adhere, in law and practice, to democratic principles and "observance of full political and human rights."

== Violations of international law ==
In 1986 the embargo was found to be in violation of the Treaty of Friendship, Commerce, and Navigation between the United States and Nicaragua but not of the international law obligation of non-intervention by the International Court of Justice. The court's ruling states that the embargo was "in breach of obligations under Article XIX of the Treaty of Friendship, Commerce and Navigation between the Parties signed at Managua on 21 January 1956", but that it was "unable to regard such action in the present case as a breach of the customary law principle of non-intervention". This Treaty states that "neither party shall impose restrictions or prohibitions on the importation of any product of the other party, or on the exportation of any product to the territories of the other party." Further, by laying mines in Nicaraguan waters to enforce the embargo, the United States of America also violated "its obligations under customary international law not to use force against another State". The United States was therefore obligated "to cease and to refrain from all such acts" and pay an unspecified amount in reparations to Nicaragua. However, the United States continued the embargo nearly 4 years after the ruling, and did not pay reparations.

== Embargo extension ==
The embargo was extended for six months by George H. W. Bush on November 1, 1989. He later lifted the embargo after five months in March 1990. Currently was reimposed in 2018. Sanctioning the pro-Sandinista regime with the gold sector in 2022 and arms embargo in March 2024.

== See also ==
- Nicaragua v. United States
- Sandinista National Liberation Front (FSLN)
- Contras
