= La Costeña (airline) =

Regional airline in Nicaragua

IATA	ICAO	Call sign
LC	NIS	LA COSTEÑA
- Founded: 1991
- Hubs: Augusto C. Sandino International Airport; Bluefields Airport
- Focus cities: Corn Island Airport; Puerto Cabezas Airport
- Fleet size: 5
- Destinations: 4
- Parent company: Regional Airlines Holding LLC
- Headquarters: Managua, Nicaragua
- Key people: Julio Caballero (Director)
- Employees: 140 (2011)
- Website: www.lacostena.com.ni

Aerotaxis La Costeña S.A. is a regional airline based in Managua, Nicaragua. It operates passenger services from Managua and Bluefields to 3 domestic destinations. Its main hubs are at Augusto C. Sandino International Airport and Bluefields Airport.

== History ==
The airline began operations in November 1991. It became part of the Grupo TACA in 1999 as a feeder carrier. By September 2011, it had 140 employees.

On May 31, 2019, Avianca Holdings sold its 62% participation in La Costeña to Regional Airlines Holding LLC, from Delaware, United States.

== Destinations ==
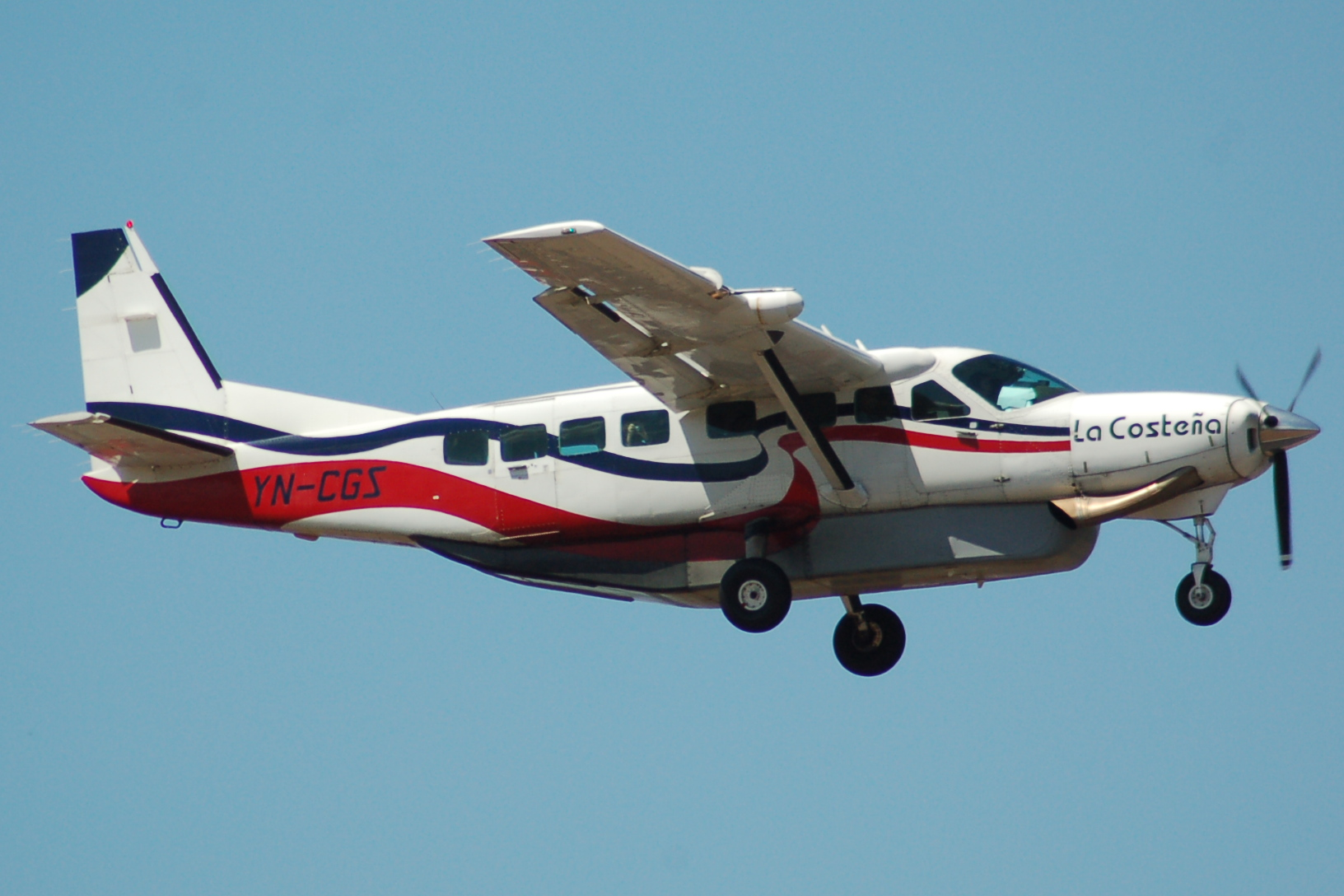
A, now retired, La Costeña Cessna 208 Caravan landing at Augusto C. Sandino International Airport in 2011.

As of April 2024, La Costeña operates limited services to domestic destinations, such as:

Country	City	Airport	Notes
Nicaragua	Bluefields	Bluefields Airport	Hub
Nicaragua	Corn Islands	Corn Islands Airport	Focus city
Nicaragua	Managua	Augusto C. Sandino International Airport	Hub
Nicaragua	Puerto Cabezas	Puerto Cabezas Airport	Focus city

== Fleet ==
=== Current fleet ===
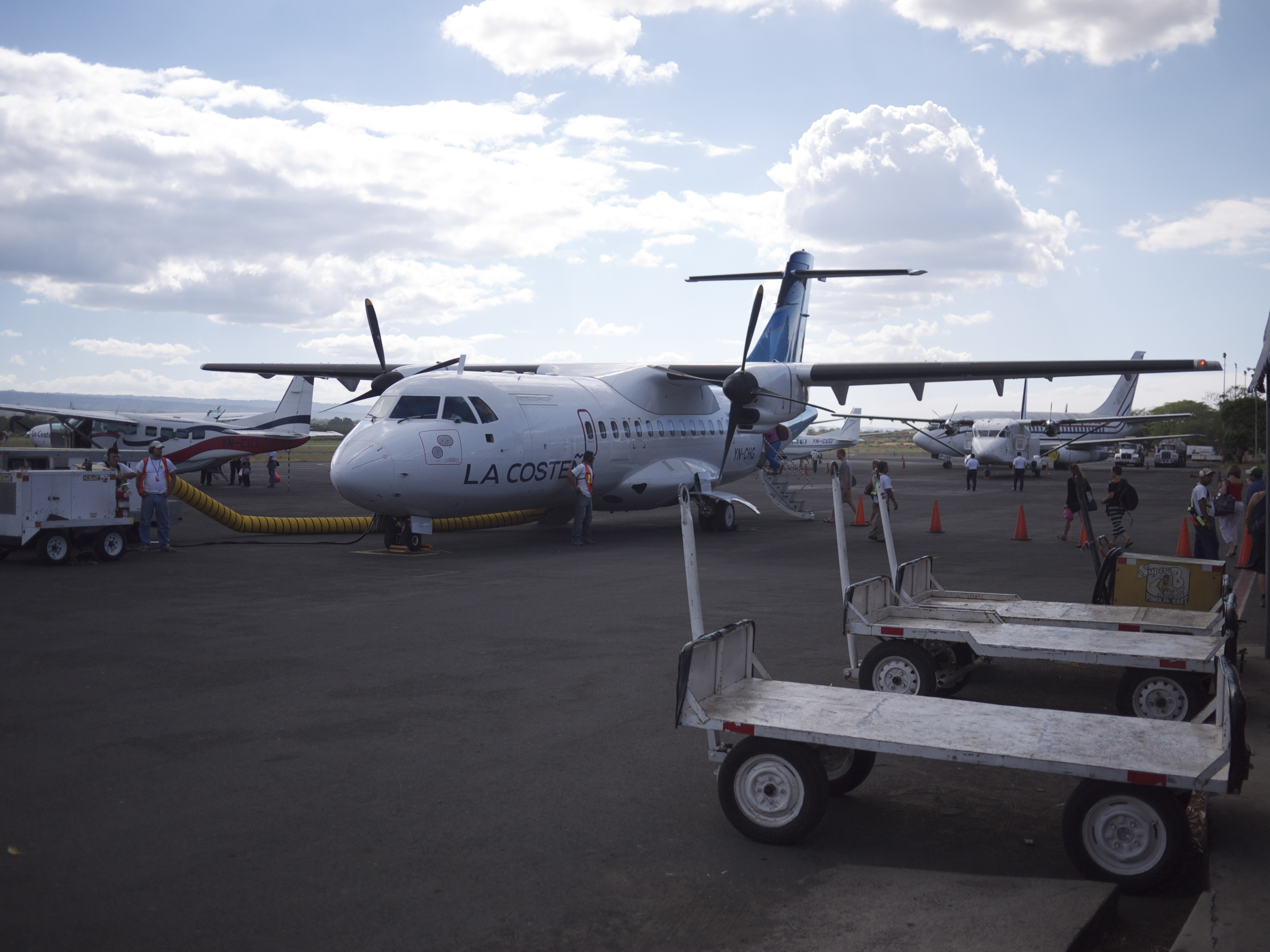
An ATR 42-320 of La Costeña parked at Augusto C. Sandino International Airport in 2011

The La Costeña fleet consists of the following aircraft (as of September 2024):

Aircraft	In service	Orders	Passengers	Notes
ATR 42-320	1	—	46	(as of August 2025)
Cessna 208 Caravan	4	—	14	
Total	5	—		

=== Former Fleet ===
Aircraft	Total	Introduced	Retired
ATR 42-300	1	2009	2023
Cessna 402	1	1994	1995
Piper PA-34 Seneca	1	1993	1998
Short 360	2	1997	2011

== Accidents and incidents ==
- On July 30, 1995, a Cessna 208B Grand Caravan (YN-CED) was hijacked by suspected drug traffickers while en route from Managua to Bluefields. On August 1, the body of the pilot was discovered in Zipaquirá, Colombia. He had reportedly been shot twice in the head and once in the back. Nicaraguan authorities suspect that the hijacked aircraft was destined for drug trafficking operations. In August, the plane was found by Colombian police in a hangar at Villavicencio-La Vanguardia Airport.
- On July 20, 1999, the same aircraft (YN-CED) was flying from Managua to Bluefields, but crashed in Cerro Silva, killing both crew members and all 14 passengers. A GPS device had been removed for use in another aircraft before the flight.

== See also ==
- List of airlines of Nicaragua
