= LANICA =

Nicaraguan passenger airline

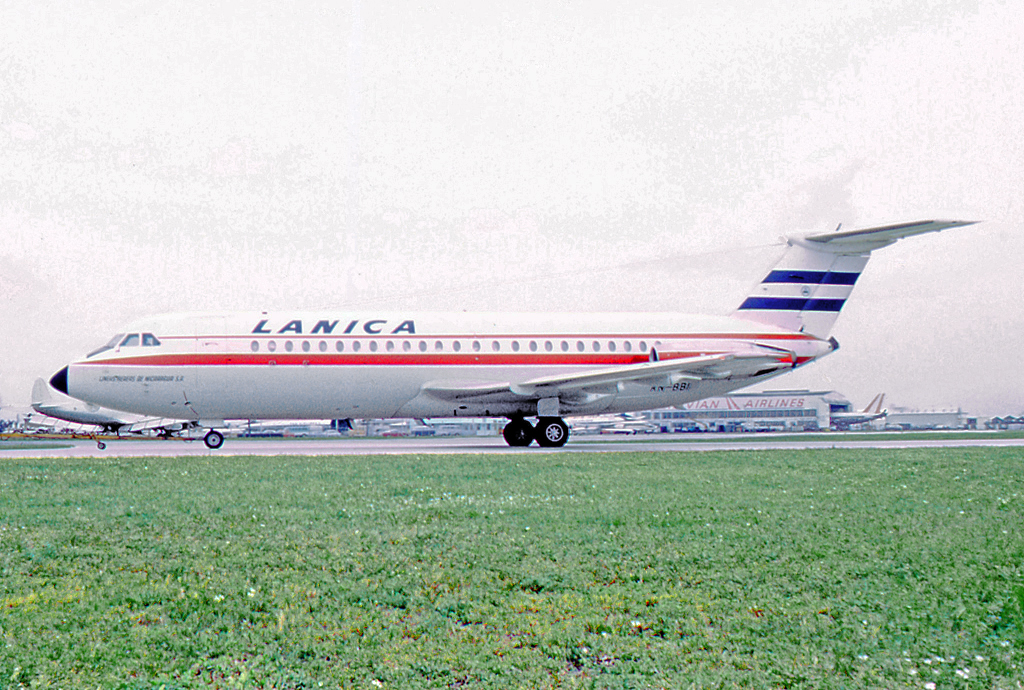
- BAC 1-11 of LANICA at Miami in October 1970
IATA	ICAO	Call sign
NI	—	LANICA
- Founded: June 1945
- Commenced operations: 1946
- Ceased operations: 1981
- Hubs: Augusto C. Sandino International Airport
- Headquarters: Managua, Nicaragua

Líneas Aéreas de Nicaragua, operating as LANICA, was an airline from Nicaragua. Headquartered in the capital Managua, it operated scheduled passenger flights within South and Central America, as well as to the United States.

== History ==
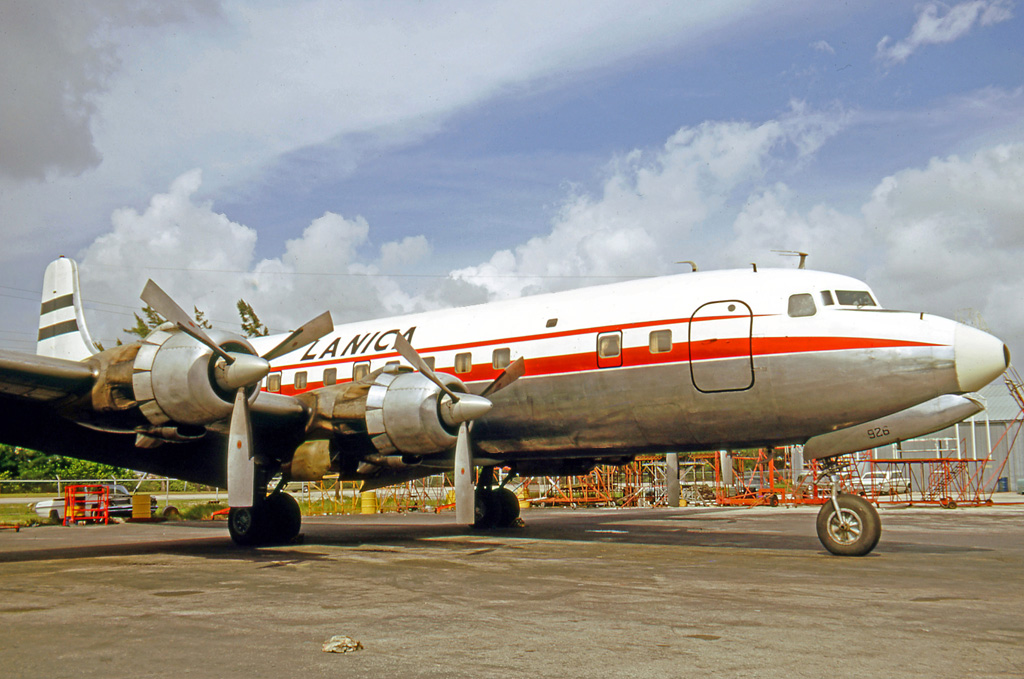
LANICA Douglas DC-6B at Miami International Airport in October 1970

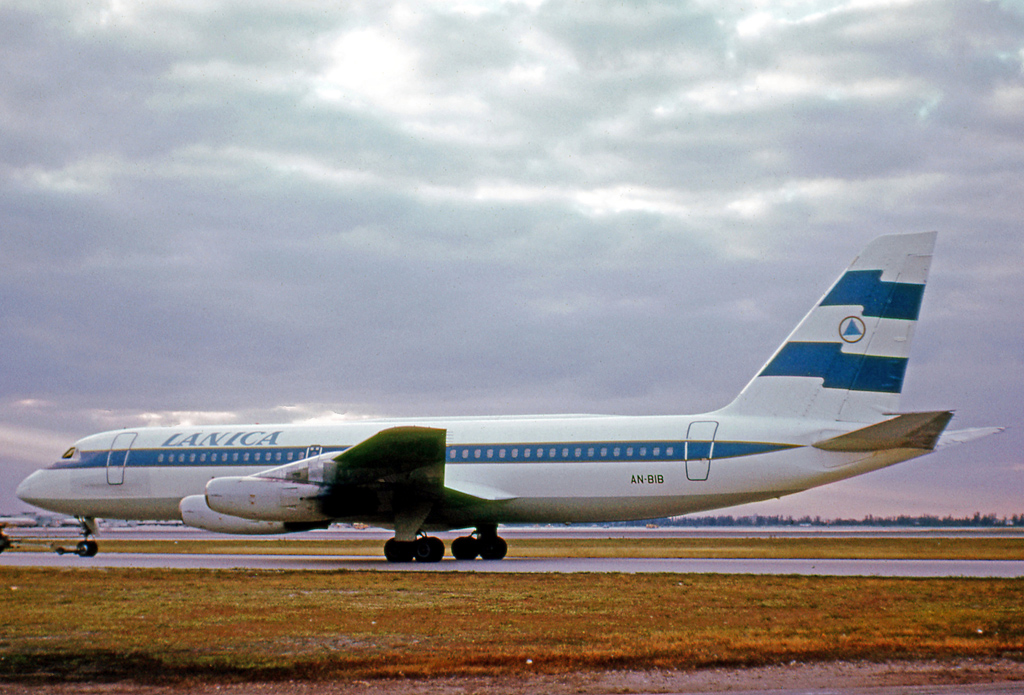
Convair 880 of LANICA operating a scheduled passenger service to Miami in December 1973

The carrier was founded in June 1945 as a subsidiary of Pan American Airways, with this airline initially holding 40% of the company. Domestic services began in 1946 with Boeing 247 equipment. The company bought the assets of a local airline called Flota Aérea Nicaragüense (FANSA) in 1950, acquiring the control of the lucrative routes to the mining towns of Bonanza and Siuna in the north.

By March 1953, the carrier's route network was 1,000 miles (1,600 km) long. At March 1955, the fleet comprised seven DC-3s and one Navion that operated local routes; that year, the airline carried 21,852 passengers.

LANICA's fleet in April 1965 was composed of one DC-3, one DC-4, one DC-6, and four C-46s, with the DC-6 flying to Miami and San Salvador.

In early 1966, the carrier ordered a BAC One-Eleven 400. Pending delivery of this new aircraft, another BAC One-Eleven, leased from Aer Lingus, was deployed on the Managua–Salvador–Miami sector in November 1966. Starting 19 October 1967, LANICA's own BAC One-Eleven was operated on a joint-ownership basis with TAN Airlines. The last BAC 1-11 was disposed of in October 1972.

Starting in May 1972, LANICA operated four examples of the larger four-engined Convair 880 jet airliner on their scheduled passenger services to Miami. The last was disposed of in 1977.

Pan Am's participation in the airline had decreased to 10% by 1975; private investors held 85% of the company until July 1972, when Howard Hughes took control of 25% of it, through Hughes Tool Company, in exchange for the lease of two Convair 880s. By March 1975, LANICA's fleet consisted of two Convair 880s, three C-46s, and four DC-6s that served a route network including domestic services, as well as international passenger and cargo services to Mexico City, Miami, and San Salvador. Two more Convair 880s were acquired in 1977.

The government of Somoza was overthrown following the rise to power of the Sandinistas in 1979. The shares held by the Somoza family —the major stockholders at the time— were seized by the Junta of National Reconstruction, but the airline's debts were not absorbed by the new government. LANICA was declared bankrupt by a Nicaraguan court in March 1981, ceasing all operations on 31 August 1981. In May of that year, the airline had a fleet of two Boeing 727-100s, three C-46s, one DC-6, and employed a 450-strong staff. LANICA was succeeded by Aeronica as Nicaragua's flag carrier.

== Destinations ==
LANICA offered scheduled international passenger flights to the following destinations:

Argentina

- Buenos Aires

Chile

- Santiago de Chile

Costa Rica

- San José

Honduras

- San Pedro Sula

Ecuador

- Guayaquil

Guatemala

- Ciudad Guatemala

México

- Mexico D.F.

Panamá

- Panama City

Perú

- Lima

United States

- Miami

Uruguay

- Montevideo

== Fleet ==
Over the years of its existence, LANICA operated the following aircraft types:

Aircraft	Introduced	Retired
Convair 880		
Boeing 727		
BAC One-Eleven		
Vickers Viscount 742-D		
Curtiss-Wright C-46 Commando		
Douglas DC-3		

== Accidents and incidents ==
Date	Location	Aircraft	Tail number	Aircraft damage	Fatalities	Description	Refs
27 August 1948	Unknown	Douglas C-47-DL	AN-ACZ	W/O	Unknown	Unknown	
23 January 1957	(Nicaragua) Ometepe Island	Douglas R4D-5	AN-AEC	W/O	16/16	Control of the aircraft was lost while flying the last leg of a domestic scheduled Managua–Bluefields–San Carlos–Managua passenger service. Crashed into Concepción after banking sharply to the left. A fire erupted following the crash, destroying the airframe completely.	
February 1960	Unknown	Douglas C-47A	AN-ADQ	W/O	Unknown	Unknown	
5 April 1960	(Nicaragua) Siuna	C-46A	AN-AIN	W/O	2/18	Crashed on a hillside while operating a domestic Siuna–Bonanza scheduled passenger service.	
4 November 1969	Unknown	BAC One-Eleven	unknown	none	none	Two hijackers commandeered the aircraft during a flight from Managua, Nicaragua, to San Salvador, El Salvador, demanding to be flown to Cuba. Instead, the airliner diverted to Grand Cayman Island in the Cayman Islands.	
25 February 1976	(Nicaragua) Managua	C-46D	AN-AOC	W/O	0	Landing gear collapse during touchdown at Managua Airport.	
17 March 1976	(Nicaragua) Puerto Cabezas	C-46A	AN-BGA	W/O	0	Unknown	
16 May 1980	(Nicaragua) Bonanza	C-46A	YN-BVL	W/O	0	Crashed at Bonanza-San Pedro Airport after striking a ditch on landing.	
13 November 1980	Panama City	Douglas DC-6BF	YN-BVI	W/O	0	Nosegear collapse.	

== See also ==
- Transport in Nicaragua

== Bibliography ==
- Eastwood, Tony, and Roach, John. Jet Airliner Production List. 2004. The Aviation Hobby Shop. ISBN none.
