= Carretera Norte =

Thoroughfare in Nicaragua

Kennedy Boulevard
- Carretera Norte, Carretera Norte Vía Panamericana

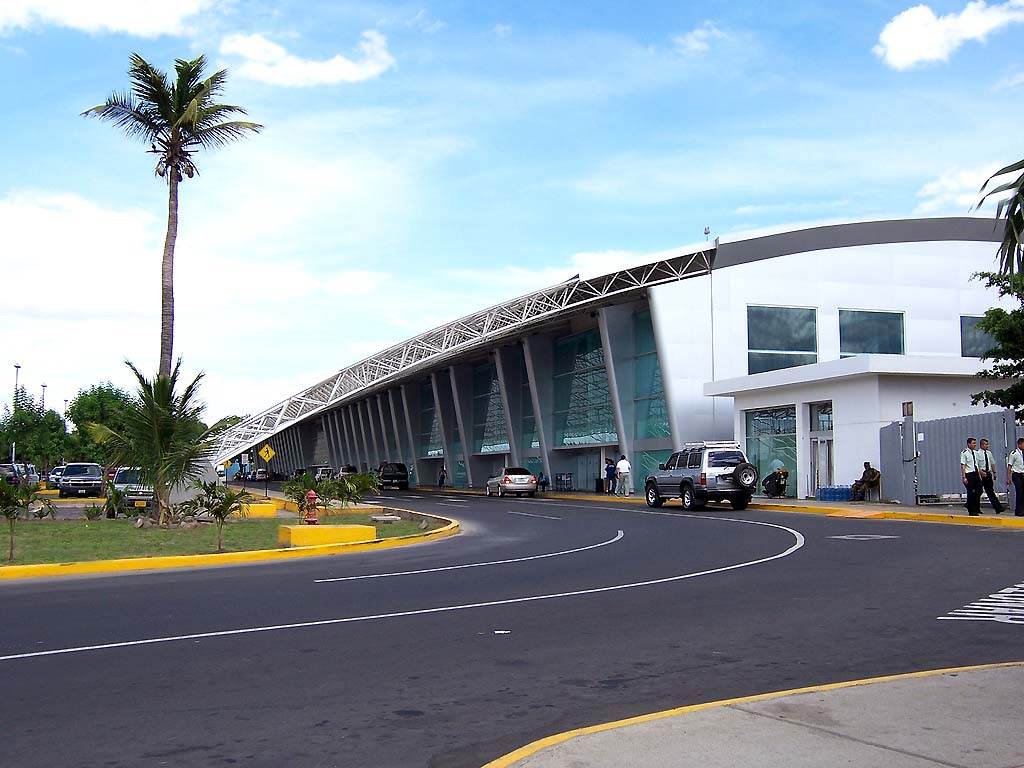
- Carretera Norte serves as the major boulevard servicing Augusto C. Sandino International Airport

Route information
- Maintained by City of Managua
- Length: 17 km (11 mi)

Major junctions
- East end: Tipitapa
- West end: Pista Pedro Joaquín Chamorro

Location
- Country: Nicaragua

Highway system
- Transport in Nicaragua

Carretera Norte, officially known as Kennedy Boulevard, is the main thoroughfare connecting the city of Managua to points east and west of the city. Its western end terminates at the Augusto C. Sandino International Airport, and the road continues east to the Pista Pedro Joaquin Chamorro.
