= Aeronica =

Nicaraguan airline, 1981–1992

IATA	ICAO	Call sign
RL	ANI	AERONICA
- Founded: 1981
- Commenced operations: 1981
- Ceased operations: 1992
- Hubs: Augusto C. Sandino International Airport
- Headquarters: Managua, Nicaragua

Aerolíneas Nicaragüenses S.A., operating as Aeronica, was an airline based in Nicaragua. Headquartered in the capital Managua, it operated scheduled passenger flights within Central America, as well as to Mexico City and the United States from its hub at the city's Augusto C. Sandino International Airport.

== History ==
Aeronica was founded in 1981, as a consequence of the demise of LANICA in earlier that year. Between 1985 and 1990, when the United States embargo against Nicaragua was in effect, the airline was banned from serving the important United States market. Further, Soviet-built Tupolev TU-154M were introduced into the Aeronica fleet as spare parts for US-made aircraft such as the Boeing 707, Boeing 720B, and Boeing 727 could not be acquired. In the early 1990s, Aeronica came under economic, laboral, and political pressure. Many of the airline's workers organized a strike in February 1992, over the privatization of their national airline. On February 28, 1992, TACA acquired a 49 percent stake in the company, resulting in the loss of many jobs in Nicaragua. In the same year, the airline license of Aeronica was revoked and in 1993 the airline shut down. Existing Aeronica airport infrastructure was then repurposed by Grupo TACA for use in their associated animal-transportation firm.

In 1994, Grupo TACA reestablished the airline as NICA Airlines, with new colors and fleet. Ten years afterwards, TACA shut down the airline, due to marketing strategies in order to consolidate under the TACA Airlines branding in the region.

== Destinations ==
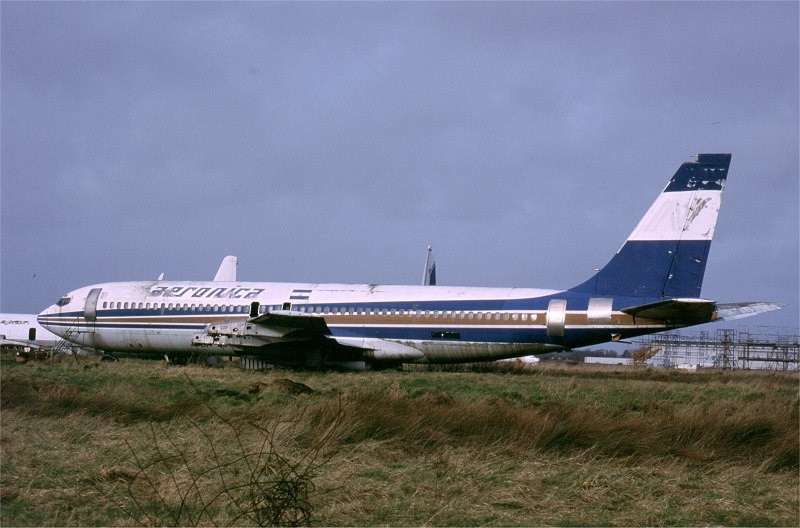
A Boeing 707-120B of Aeronica, shown stored at Shannon Airport in 2003

During the 1980s, Aeronica offered scheduled international passenger flights to the following destinations:

Costa Rica

- San José - Juan Santamaría International Airport

El Salvador

- San Salvador - Cuscatlan International Airport

Guatemala

- Guatemala City - La Aurora International Airport

Mexico

- Mexico City - Mexico City International Airport

Nicaragua

- Managua - Augusto C. Sandino International Airport (hub)

Panama

- Panama City - Tocumen International Airport

United States

- Miami - Miami International Airport

== Fleet ==
Over the years of its existence, Aeronica operated the following aircraft types:

Aeronica fleet
Aircraft	Introduced	Retired
Antonov An-26		
Antonov An-32		
Boeing 707 / Boeing 720B		
Boeing 727-100 / Boeing 727-200		
CASA C-212 Aviocar		
Curtiss-Wright C-46 Commando		
Douglas DC-6		
Fokker F27 Friendship		
Tupolev Tu-154M		

== Accidents and incidents ==
- On 12 December 1981, a bomb exploded inside the passenger cabin of a parked Aeronica Boeing 727-100 (registered YN-BXW) at Mexico City International Airport, tearing a hole into the fuselage. The captain, two flight attendants, and a ground worker were injured. They had been on board the aircraft for pre-departure checks for a scheduled passenger flight to San Salvador and onwards to Managua.
- On 10 May 1982, two hijackers demanded a Curtiss-Wright C-46 Commando to leave its Bluefields-Big Corn Island route and land in Costa Rica instead. The pilots obeyed and landed at Limón, where the perpetrators surrendered.
- On 29 June 1983, an Aeronica CASA C-212 Aviocar (registered YN-BYZ) was damaged beyond economical repair in a crash landing at Augusto C. Sandino International Airport, which happened because the copilot had accidentally applied reverse thrust rather than the flaps immediately before landing.
- On 20 April 1985, a problem was encountered with the additional fuel tanks that a Fokker F27 Friendship (registered YN-BZF) had been fitted with for the delivery flight to Aeronica from Europe to Nicaragua. The pilots decided to return to Kulusuk Airport in Greenland, the place of their most recent fuel stop, but failed to do so. The aircraft crashed on a snow-covered strip, killing two of the five occupants.
- On 28 December 1987 at 14:36 local time, an Aeronica Douglas DC-6 lost its inner right engine whilst en route a cargo flight from Managua to Panama City. Debris had also damaged the outer right engine, forcing the pilots to execute a water landing in a river in Costa Rica, which all six persons on board survived.
- The worst accident in the history of Aeronica happened on 26 May 1988, when another DC-6 (registered YN-CBE) crashed near Limón in Costa Rica, killing the six occupants.
- On 10 November 1991, an Aeronica Boeing 727-100 (registered YN-BXW, the same aircraft that had been damaged in a bomb explosion in 1981) was destroyed in a fire at Managua Airport, which had arisen from an ignited oxygen leak during maintenance work.
