= Augusto C. Sandino International Airport =

Main airport serving Managua, Nicaragua

Augusto C. Sandino International Airport Aeropuerto Internacional Augusto C. Sandino
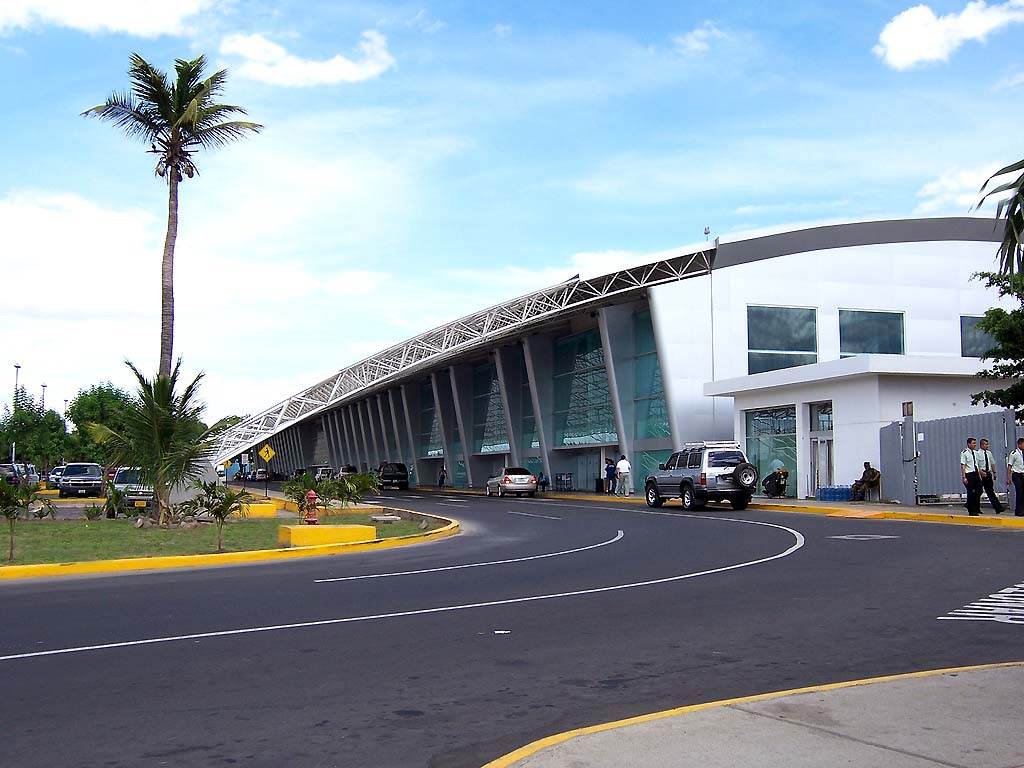
- IATA: MGA; ICAO: MNMG

Summary
- Airport type: Public / Military
- Owner: Government of Nicaragua
- Operator: EAAI (Empresa Administradora de Aeropuertos Internacionales)
- Serves: Managua
- Location: Managua, Nicaragua
- Hub for: La Costeña
- Elevation AMSL: 59 m (194 ft)
- Coordinates: 12°08′29″N 086°10′05″W
- Website: www.eaai.com.ni

Map
- Location within Nicaragua

Runways
Direction	Length		Surface
Direction	m	ft	Surface
10/28	2,442	8,012	Asphalt

Statistics (2017)
- Passengers: 1,627,527
- Passenger change 16–17: ▲6.2%
- Aircraft movements: 36,510
- Movements change 16–17: ▼0.8%
- Source: Nicaraguan AIP, MTI

Augusto C. Sandino International Airport (IATA: MGA, ICAO: MNMG), or ACS, is the main joint civil-military public international airport serving Managua, the capital of Nicaragua. It is named after Nicaraguan revolutionary Augusto Nicolás Sandino (1895–1934) and is located in the city's 6th ward, known locally as Distrito 6.

Originally christened Las Mercedes Airport in 1968, it was later renamed Augusto C. Sandino International Airport during the Sandinista government in the 1980s and again in 2001 to Managua International Airport by then-president Arnoldo Alemán. Its name was changed once more in February 2007 to its current name by President Daniel Ortega to honor the revolutionary.

Managua also has an alternative landing strip at Punta Huete Airport. Punta Huete was designed for larger aircraft and thus has a longer landing strip (3,000m vs. MGA's 2,442m). This alternative landing site, however, does not service commercial aircraft. The airport is managed by the state-run Administrative Company of International Airports, more commonly known as the EAAI, given its Spanish name, the Empresa Administradora de Aeropuertos Internacionales.

== History ==
Managua's previous airport, Xolotlan Airport, which was located about 2 mi (3.2 km) east of Managua, built in 1915, and it quickly became too small for Managua's airline service growth. In 1942, the Nicaraguan Government and Pan American Airways signed a contract to construct an airport by Las Mercedes Country Estate. Las Mercedes was further upgraded, re-designed to handle Boeing 707 aircraft, and re-inaugurated in July 1968 by Anastasio Somoza Debayle.

In the early 1970s, Las Mercedes was expanded to more modern standards; this included four health inspectors, eight immigration officers, and ten customs inspectors. It was considered fully equipped, having air conditioning, background music, loudspeakers, and conveyor belts for baggage handling. It also had a restaurant on its upper floor where visitors and travelers could see airport movement.

The expanded airport could serve three aircraft at once. By 1975, LANICA, Pan Am, KLM, TACA Airlines, Sahsa, Avianca, Iberia, SAM, TAN, Varig, and other carriers flew into Las Mercedes. When the Sandinistas took power, the airport was named after Augusto César Sandino, a Nicaraguan revolutionary and guerrilla leader, after whom the Sandinista movement is named. The Sandinistas, however, did not maintain the airport, and it began to deteriorate until it was expanded and remodeled in 1996, which installed two new boarding bridges.

On September 8, 1983 a pair of Cessna 404s operated by Democratic Revolutionary Alliance Contra forces attempted to bomb the facilities, with one shot down by EPS anti-aircraft fire, crashing near the control tower, killing both pilots and an airport worker on the ground, with 40 injured. US Senators Gary Hart and William Cohen both narrowly missed the attack due to a delay in their flight to Managua.

The airport was renamed "Managua International Airport" in 2001 by then President Arnoldo Alemán and renamed again in 2007 to its current name by President Daniel Ortega. In mid-2007, President Daniel Ortega renamed the airport in honor of Sandino. Nicaraguan artist Róger Pérez de la Rocha has created two large portraits of Augusto César Sandino and Rubén Darío; both of them lie in the lobby.

Las Mercedes served as a hub for many of Nicaragua's flag carriers, such as LANICA (until 1978), Aeronica (1981–1992), and NICA (1992–2004). When NICA became a member of Grupo TACA during the 1990s, the number of important connections to the rest of Latin America from which ACS grew considerably.

According to EAAI (Empresa Administradora de Aeropuertos Internacionales), ACS is the most modern airport in Central America and the 4th safest in the world. It is located just 11 km (7 mi) from Managua's downtown, has a runway that measures 8,015 ft (2,443 m) in length, and is at an elevation of 194 ft (59 m).

== Expansion ==
A large expansion program was underway by 2003, and as of July 2006, the final phase was completed. The airport was equipped with 7 gates with jetways and room for 20 airplanes to park. It had been reported in the recent past that the runway would be lengthened by 800 m (2,625 ft), but this project has not begun, despite the government's achievements in building new airports elsewhere in Nicaragua or greatly overhauling existing airport/airfield infrastructure in other locations as well.

Facilities within the airport include a tourist information desk, bank, restaurants, bars, post office, souvenir shops, duty-free shops, lounge, and more. The types of services in the VIP lounge include checking baggage and documents with customs and immigration plus the airline; a bar service, snacks, etc.

== Operations ==
Augusto C. Sandino International Airport is Nicaragua's main international gateway. Domestic flights fly between Bluefields, the Corn Islands, and Puerto Cabezas. The airport is accessed by the Panamerican Highway, known as the Carretera Norte.

== Airlines and destinations ==
=== Passenger ===
Airlines	Destinations
Aeroméxico Connect	Mexico City–Benito Juárez
American Airlines	Miami
Avianca El Salvador	Miami, San Salvador
Conviasa	Havana
Copa Airlines	Guatemala City, Panama City–Tocumen, San Jose (CR)
La Costeña	Bluefields, Corn Island, Puerto Cabezas
Sansa Airlines	San Jose (CR)
United Airlines	Houston–Intercontinental
WestJet	Seasonal: Montréal–Trudeau

== Statistics ==
=== Traffic figures ===
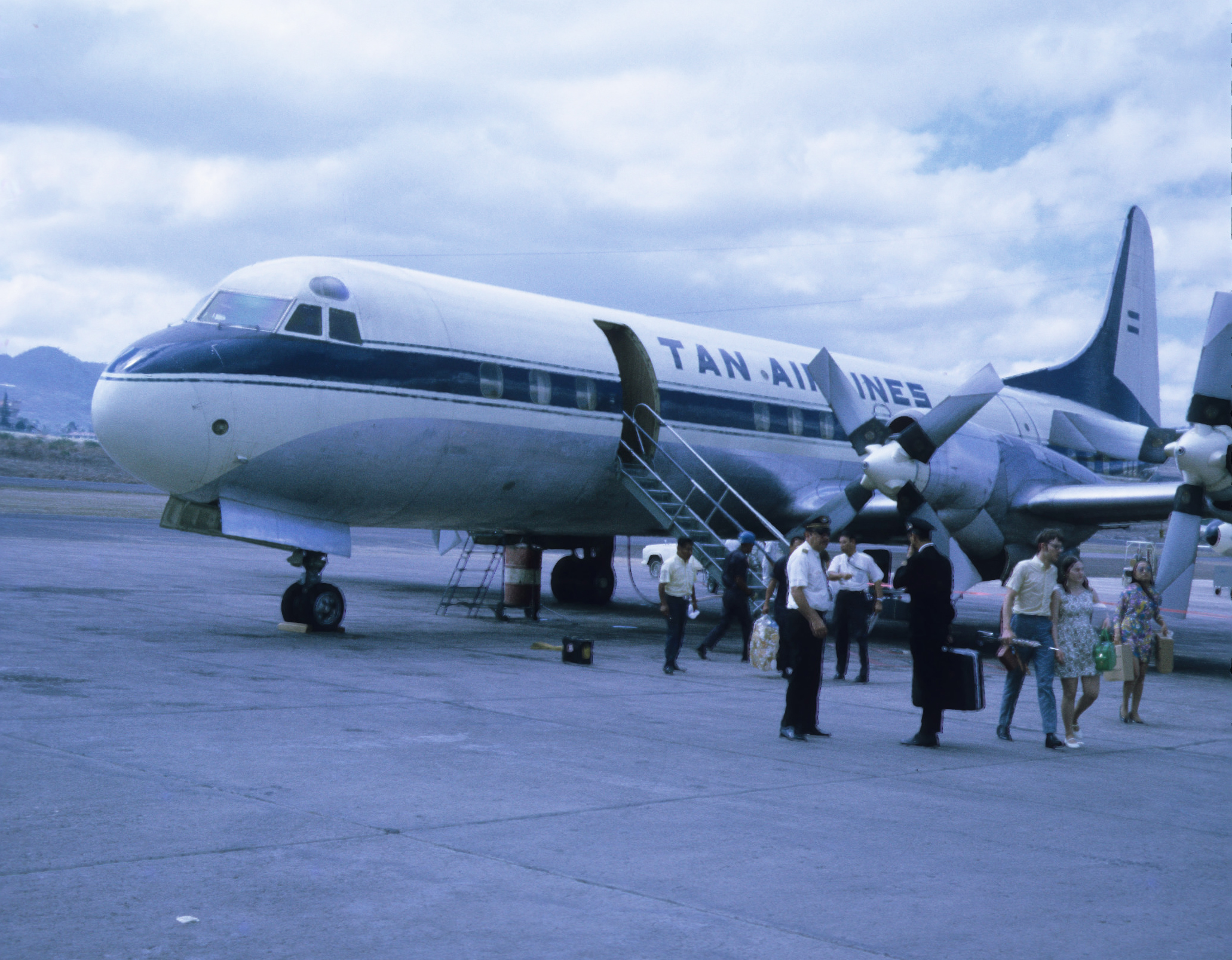
Lockheed L-188 Electra of TAN Airlines (Transportes Aéreos Nacionales S.A.) operating at Las Mercedes Airport, Managua, Nicaragua in 1970s

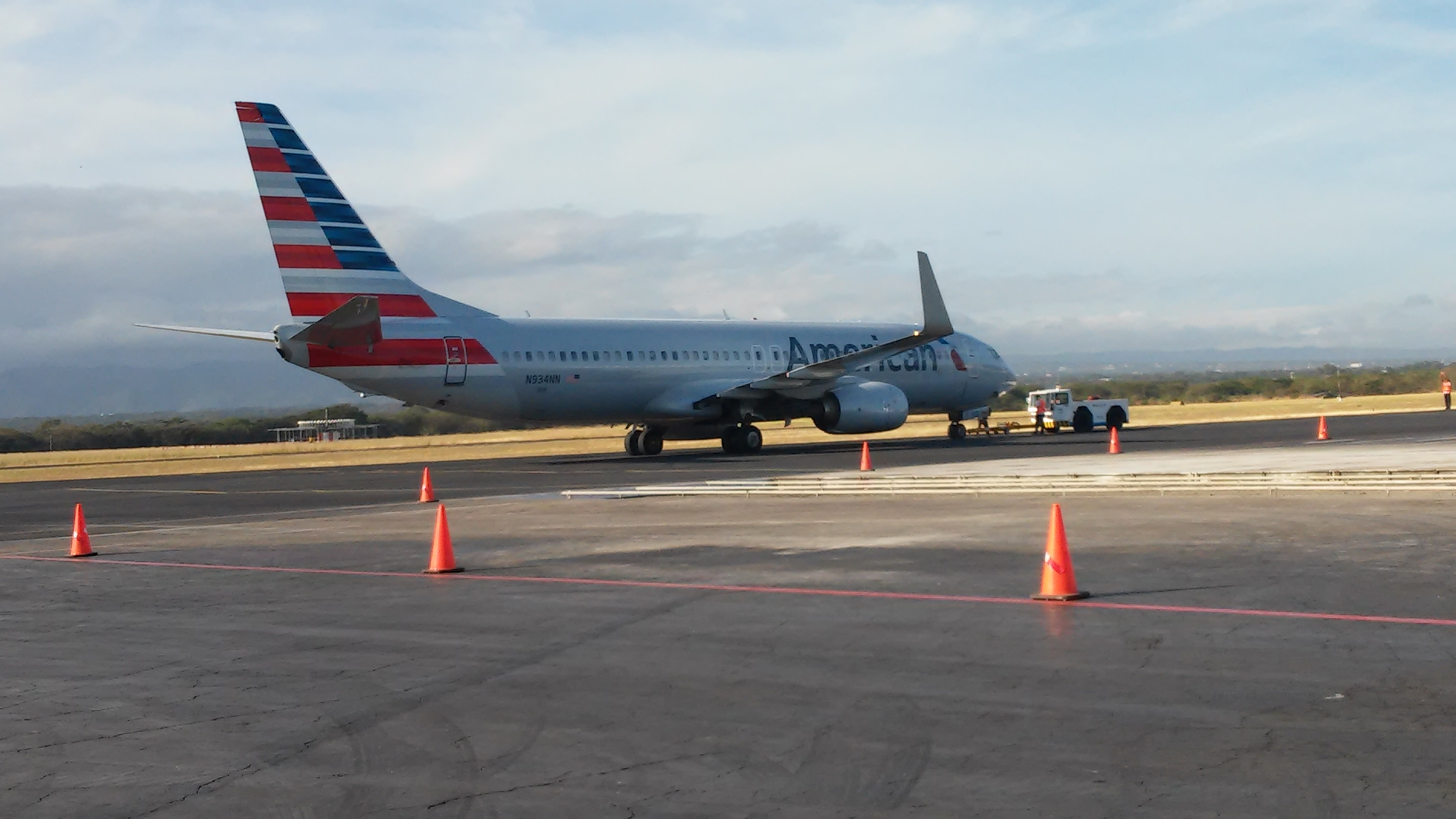
American Airlines Boeing 737-800 taxiing for departure from Managua en route to Miami International Airport, one of the well-traveled routes from the airport

Traffic by calendar year, official government statistics
	Passengers	Change from previous year	Aircraft operations	Change from previous year	Cargo (metric tons)	Change from previous year
2006	979,508	▼6.96%	30,897	▼0.30%	19,223	▲0.05%
2007	1,051,830	▲7.38%	30,609	▼0.93%	21,727	▲13.03%
2008	1,138,626	▲8.25%	31,705	▲3.58%	19,129	▼11.96%
2009	1,090,004	▼4.27%	31,677	▼0.09%	18,946	▼0.96%
2010	1,102,196	▲1.12%	30,030	▼5.20%	25,981	▲37.13%
2011	1,120,147	▲1.63%	28,855	▼3.91%	22,330	▼14.05%
2012	1,201,141	▲7.23%	30,697	▲6.38%	23,531	▲5.38%
2013	1,206,172	▲0.42%	29,955	▼2.42%	22,281	▼5.41%
2014	1,311,965	▲8.77%	29,326	▼2.10%	23,375	▲4.91%
2015	1,499,756	▲14.31%	32,173	▲9.71%	29,034	▲24.21%
2016	1,533,034	▲2.22%	36,822	▲14.45%	25,383	▼12.57%
2017	1,627,527	▲6.16%	36,510	▼0.85%	25,639	▲1.01%
Source: Nicaraguan Institute of Civil Aviation. Statistical Reports (years 2007, 2008, 2009, 2010, 2011, 2012, 2013, 2014, 2015 and 2016)

=== Top international destinations ===
Busiest international routes to and from MGA (Jan. 2014 – Dec. 2016)
	Airport	2014	2015	2016	Δ 14–15	Δ 15–16	Carriers
1	Miami, United States	407,800	443,800	470,000	▲8.8%	▲5.9%	American, Avianca
2	Houston, United States	172,400	211,400	194,000	▲22.6%	▼8.2%	United
3	Panama City, Panama	174,000	196,600	197,700	▲13.0%	▲1.1%	Copa
4	San Salvador, El Salvador	165,600	175,900	145,000	▲6.2%	▼30.9%	Avianca, Volaris
5	San José, Costa Rica	78,500	79,900	100,000	▲1.7%	▲25.1%	Avianca, Copa, Volaris
6	Atlanta, United States	87,100	96,500	97,000	▲10.7%	▲0.5%	Delta
7	Guatemala City, Guatemala	42,500	52,800	86,000	▲24.2%	▲62.9%	Avianca, Copa
8	Mexico City, Mexico	3,500	45,700	52,000	▲1,222.8%	▲13.7%	Aeroméxico Connect
Source: Ministry of Transport and Infrastructure (MTI). Transportation Statistical Yearbook of Nicaragua (years 2014, 2015 and 2016)

=== Traffic share of airlines flying to MGA ===
Airline	Percentage of passengers transported (2015)
(Panama) Copa Airlines	31%
Avianca El Salvador	20%
(United States) American Airlines	15%
(United States) United Airlines	14%
(United States) Delta Air Lines	7%
(United States) Spirit Airlines	6%
(Mexico) Aeroméxico	3%
(Cuba) Aero Caribbean	2%
(Nicaragua) La Costeña	1%
(Venezuela) Conviasa	1%
(Costa Rica) Nature Air	1%
Total	100.0%

== See also ==
- List of airports in Nicaragua
- Transport in Nicaragua
