= Administrative Company of International Airports =

Nicaraguan government entity

The Administrative Company of International Airports (ACIA), more commonly known as the Empresa Administradora de Aeropuertos Internacionales (EAAI) in Spanish, is the governmental agency responsible for the operation and development of civil airports in Nicaragua.

== Background ==
The agency was founded on August 16, 1983 as a decentralized entity with its own assets, legal personality and indefinite duration, under the direction and control of the Corporation of Transport of the People (COTRAP). The agency's original mission was to manage future existing international airports and the development of new aviation-related facilities, including applicable auxiliary functions.
