= Elections in Nicaragua =

The Republic of Nicaragua elects on the national level a head of state—the president—and a unicameral legislature. The president of Nicaragua and their vice-president are elected on one ballot for a five-year term by the people.

The National Assembly (Asamblea Nacional) has 92 members: 90 deputies elected for a five-year term by proportional representation (20 nationally and 70 regionally), the outgoing president, and the runner-up in the last presidential election. Should the president be reelected (not originally planned for in the Nicaraguan constitution), the outgoing vice president takes the seat reserved for him instead. In July 2026, current President Daniel Ortega announced the suspension of future elections in Nicaragua.

== Latest elections ==
=== President ===
In the early hours of 8 November, the president of the Supreme Electoral Council Brenda Rocha reported that with 49.25% of the votes counted, Daniel Ortega's Sandinista Front was winning the elections, obtaining 74.99% of the votes cast with a 65.3% turnout. An organization called Urnas Abiertas (Open Ballot Boxes), with known opposition links, estimated that the turnout was much lower than the official results, at only 18.5%, according to an analysis by 1,450 poll-watchers at 563 voting centers across Nicaragua. However, the thousands of official poll watchers from the six opposition parties did not support this claim.

Candidate	Running mate	Party	Votes	%
Daniel Ortega	Rosario Murillo	Sandinista National Liberation Front	2,093,834	75.87
Walter Espinoza	Mayra Argüello	Constitutionalist Liberal Party	395,406	14.33
Guillermo Osorno	Violeta Martínez	Nicaraguan Party of the Christian Path	89,853	3.26
Marcelo Montiel	Jennyfer Espinoza	Nicaraguan Liberal Alliance	85,711	3.11
Gerson Gutiérrez	Claudia Romero	Alliance for the Republic	48,429	1.75
Mauricio Orué	Zobeyda Rodríguez	Independent Liberal Party	46,510	1.69
Total			2,759,743	100.00

=== National Assembly ===
Party	National			Constituency			Total seats
Party	Votes	%	Seats	Votes	%	Seats	Total seats
Sandinista National Liberation Front	2,039,717	74.17	15	2,024,598	73.29	60	75
Constitutionalist Liberal Party	259,789	9.45	2	411,101	14.88	7	9
Nicaraguan Liberal Alliance	140,199	5.10	1	99,335	3.60	1	2
Independent Liberal Party	128,520	4.67	1	69,523	2.52	0	1
Alliance for the Republic	127,997	4.65	1	49,172	1.78	0	1
Nicaraguan Party of the Christian Path	53,959	1.96	0	82,844	3.00	1	1
YATAMA				25,718	0.93	1	1
Reserved seat							1
Total	2,750,181	100.00	20	2,762,291	100.00	70	91

=== Central American Parliament ===
Party	Votes	%	Seats	+/–
Sandinista National Liberation Front	2,033,231	74.17	15	0
Constitutionalist Liberal Party	258,433	9.43	2	–1
Nicaraguan Liberal Alliance	139,804	5.10	1	0
Independent Liberal Party	128,421	4.68	1	0
Alliance for the Republic	127,838	4.66	1	+1
Nicaraguan Party of the Christian Path	53,676	1.96	0	New
Total	2,741,403	100.00	20	0

== Past elections ==
=== Presidential elections 1984–2011 ===
==== 1984 ====
The 1984 election took place on November 4. Of the 1,551,597 citizens registered in July, 1,170,142 voted (75.41%). The null votes were 6% of the total. The national averages of valid votes for president were:

- Daniel Ortega, Sandinista National Liberation Front (FSLN) – 66.97%
- Clemente Guido, Democratic Conservative Party (PCD) – 14.04%
- Virgilio Godoy, Independent Liberal Party (PLI) – 9.60%
- Mauricio Diaz, Popular Social Christian Party (PPSC) – 5.56%
- Allan Zambrana, Nicaraguan Communist Party (PCdeN) – 1.45%
- Domingo Sánchez Sancho, Nicaraguan Socialist Party (PSN) – 1.31%
- Isidro Téllez, Marxist-Leninist Popular Action Movement (MAP-ML) – 1.03%

The pro-Sandinista magazine, Envio claimed that this election was considered to have the "most freedom of choice" in the nation's history and was approved by international advocates of free elections.

==== 1990 ====
The historical election of 1990 took place on February 25. The total registered voters were 1,752,088 and the abstentions 241,250 or 13.7%. The United Nicaraguan Opposition coalition of those who opposed the ruling Sandinista National Liberation Front was victorious, winning 55% of the vote. Violeta Chamorro became president. The national averages of valid votes for president were:

- Violeta Barrios de Chamorro, National Opposition Union (UNO) – 777,552 votes – 54.73%
- Daniel Ortega, Sandinista National Liberation Front (FSLN) – 579,886 votes – 40.82%
- Other – 63,106 – 4.45%

==== 1996 ====
In presidential elections, Arnoldo Alemán of the Liberal Alliance-Liberal Constitutionalist Party defeated Daniel Ortega of the Sandinista National Liberation Front. A record number of 24 parties and alliances participated in these elections.

- Arnoldo Alemán, Liberal Alliance – 51.03%
- Daniel Ortega, Sandinista National Liberation Front (FSLN) – 37.75%
- Guillermo Osorno, Nicaraguan Party of the Christian Path (CCN) – 4.10%
- Noel Vidaurre, Nicaraguan Conservative Party (PCN) – 2.26%
- Other (20 other candidates with less than 1% of the votes) – 4.86%

==== 2001 ====
Candidate	Running mate	Party	Votes	%
Enrique Bolaños	José Rizo	Constitutionalist Liberal Party	1,228,412	56.31
Daniel Ortega	Agustín Jarquín	Sandinista National Liberation Front	922,436	42.28
Alberto Saborío	Consuelo Sequeira	Conservative Party	30,670	1.41
Total			2,181,518	100.00
Registered voters/turnout			2,980,641	–
Source: CSE, IPADE

==== 2006 ====
Candidate	Running mate	Party	Votes	%
Daniel Ortega	Jaime Morales Carazo	Sandinista National Liberation Front	854,316	38.07
Eduardo Montealegre	Fabricio Cajina	Nicaraguan Liberal Alliance	650,879	29.00
José Rizo Castellón	Jose Antonio Alvarado	Constitutionalist Liberal Party	588,304	26.21
Edmundo Jarquín	Carlos Mejía	Sandinista Renovation Movement	144,596	6.44
Edén Pastora	Mercedes Tenorio	Alternative for Change	6,120	0.27
Total			2,244,215	100.00
Registered voters/turnout			3,665,141	–
Source: IFES

==== 2011 ====
Candidate	Running mate	Party	Votes	%
Daniel Ortega	Omar Halleslevens	Sandinista National Liberation Front	1,569,287	62.46
Fabio Gadea Mantilla	Edmundo Jarquín	Independent Liberal Party	778,889	31.00
Arnoldo Alemán	Francisco Aguirre	Constitutionalist Liberal Party	148,507	5.91
Édgar Enrique Quiñónez Tuckler	Diana Urbina	Nicaraguan Liberal Alliance	10,003	0.40
Róger Antonio Guevara Mena	Elizabeth Rojas	Alliance for the Republic	5,898	0.23
Total			2,512,584	100.00
Source: Supreme Electoral Council

==== 2016 ====
Candidate	Party	Votes	%
Daniel Ortega	Sandinista National Liberation Front	1,806,651	72.44
Maximino Rodríguez	Constitutionalist Liberal Party	374,898	15.03
José Alvarado	Independent Liberal Party	112,562	4.51
Saturnino Cerrato	Nicaraguan Liberal Alliance	107,392	4.31
Erick Cabezas	Conservative Party	57,437	2.30
Carlos Canales	Alliance for the Republic	35,002	1.40
Invalid/blank votes		–	–
Total		2,493,942	100
Registered voters/turnout		–	–
Source: CSE, BBC

=== Parliamentary election results 1984–2016 ===
==== 1984 ====
The 1984 parliamentary election was held together with the presidential election on November 4. The percentages for National Assembly representatives were very similar to those the parties had received for their presidential candidate. The electoral quotient needed to win one of the 90 National Assembly seats was obtained by dividing the number of valid votes in each region by the number of representatives that had been assigned to each region, proportional to its population.

Each party's "left over" votes—those insufficient to earn it a seat in a given region—were then added together and re-tallied nationally. The seats earned in this second count went to the next candidate on the party's slate in the regions where it had come closest to winning on the first round. In addition, any party getting at least 1% of the presidential vote (which all six losing parties did) was allowed a seat for its defeated presidential candidate. The final composition of the National Assembly was thus:

- Sandinista National Liberation Front (FSLN) – 61 seats
- Democratic Conservative Party (PCD) – 14 seats
- Independent Liberal Party (PLI) – 9 seats
- Popular Social Christian Party (PPSC) – 6 seats
- Nicaraguan Communist Party (PCdeN) – 2 seats
- Nicaraguan Socialist Party (PSN) – 2 seats
- Marxist-Leninist Popular Action Movement (MAP-ML) – 2 seats

==== 1990 ====
The 1990 parliamentary election was held together with the presidential election on February 25. The final composition of the National Assembly in 1990 was:

- National Opposition Union (UNO) – 51 seats
- Sandinista National Liberation Front (FSLN) – 39 seats
- Democratic Conservative Party (PCD) – 3 seats
- Independent Liberal Party (PLI) – 3 seats
- Popular Social Christian Party (PPSC) – 3 seats
- Nicaraguan Communist Party (PCdeN) – 3 seats
- Nicaraguan Socialist Party (PSN) – 3 seats
- Marxist-Leninist Popular Action Movement (MAP-ML) – 3 seats
- Revolutionary Unity Movement (MUR) – 1 seat
- Social Christian Party (PSC) – 1 seat

Note: The 1990 Assembly members are joined by any presidential candidate who receives over 1% of the vote

==== 1996 ====
The 1996 elections for the National Assembly took place together with the presidential election on October 20. The final composition of the National Assembly in 1996 was:

- Liberal Alliance (AL) – 42 seats
- Sandinista National Liberation Front (FSLN) – 36 seats
- Nicaraguan Party of the Christian Path (CCN) – 4 seats
- Nicaraguan Conservative Party (PCN) – 3 seats
- National Project (PRONAL) – 2 seats
- Nicaraguan Resistance Party (PRN) – 1 seat
- Sandinista Renovation Movement (MRS) – 1 seat
- Unity Alliance (AU) – 1 seat
- Independent Liberal Party (PLI) – 1 seat
- National Conservative Action (ANC) – 1 seat
- UNO-96 Alliance (UNO-96) – 1 seat

==== 2001 ====
Party	National			Departmental			Total seats
Party	Votes	%	Seats	Votes	%	Seats	Total seats
Constitutionalist Liberal Party	1,144,182	53.23	11	1,132,876	52.60	41	52
Sandinista National Liberation Front	905,589	42.13	9	901,254	41.84	28	37
Conservative Party	99,673	4.64	0	105,130	4.88	1	1
YATAMA				11,139	0.52	0	0
Multiethnic Party for Coast Unity				3,520	0.16	0	0
Special members (Note: The runner-up in the presidential election and the outgoing president are special members of the National Assembly.)							2
Total	2,149,444	100.00	20	2,153,919	100.00	70	92
Source: CSE, CSE, IRI

==== By region ====
Region	FSLN	PLC	PCN	Other
Boaco	27.98%	68.43%	3.60%	0.00%
Carazo	46.44%	48.61%	4.95%	0.00%
Chinandega	50.54%	43.98%	5.48%	0.00%
Chontales	27.65%	65.39%	6.96%	0.00%
Esteli	50.57%	45.84%	3.59%	0.00%
Granada	38.29%	47.72%	13.98%	0.00%
Jinotega	38.08%	59.67%	2.25%	0.00%
Leon	51.08%	45.35%	3.56%	0.00%
Madriz	46.13%	50.22%	3.66%	0.00%
Managua	44.22%	49.32%	6.47%	0.00%
Masaya	41.77%	53.64%	4.59%	0.00%
Matagalpa	39.24%	57.50%	3.26%	0.00%
Nueva Segovia	45.97%	52.61%	1.42%	0.00%
RAAN	37.42%	43.87%	1.96%	16.75%
RAAS	21.34%	73.11%	1.84%	3.71%
Rio San Juan	34.96%	59.40%	5.64%	0.00%
Rivas	41.06%	51.56%	7.38%	0.00%
Source: Constituency Level Elections Archive

==== 2006 ====
Party	National			Departmental			Total seats	+/–
Party	Votes	%	Seats	Votes	%	Seats	Total seats	+/–
Sandinista National Liberation Front	840,851	37.59	8	847,565	37.90	30	38	+1
Nicaraguan Liberal Alliance	597,709	26.72	4	596,281	26.66	18	22	New
Constitutionalist Liberal Party	592,118	26.47	8	591,805	26.46	17	25	–27
Sandinista Renovation Movement	194,416	8.69	0	188,335	8.42	5	5	New
Alternative for Change	12,053	0.54	0	12,354	0.55	0	0	New
Special members (Note: The runner-up in the presidential election (Eduardo Montealegre of the ALN) and the outgoing president Enrique Bolaños Geyer (independent) are special members of the National Assembly.)							2	0
Total	2,237,147	100.00	20	2,236,340	100.00	70	92	0
Registered voters/turnout	3,665,141	–						
Source: IFES, Election Passport, Psephos

==== 2011 ====
Party	National			Departmental			Total seats	+/–
Party	Votes	%	Seats	Votes	%	Seats	Total seats	+/–
Sandinista National Liberation Front	1,583,199	60.85	13	1,595,470	60.64	49	62	+11
Independent Liberal Party	822,023	31.59	6	824,180	31.33	20	26	New
Constitutionalist Liberal Party	167,639	6.44	1	173,306	6.59	1	2	–23
Nicaraguan Liberal Alliance	19,658	0.76	0	24,870	0.95	0	0	–22
Alliance for the Republic	9,317	0.36	0	13,063	0.50	0	0	New
Special members (Note: The runner-up in the presidential election (Fabio Gadea Mantilla of the PLI) and the outgoing president are special members of the National Assembly; as Ortega was re-elected, the outgoing Vice President (Jaime Morales Carazo of the FSLN), who was not Ortega's running mate in this election (having been replaced by Omar Halleslevens, took his seat.)							2	0
Total	2,601,836	100.00	20	2,630,889	100.00	70	92	0
Source: Supreme Electoral Council

2016 legislative election

Party	National			Constituency			Total seats	+/–
Party	Votes	%	Seats	Votes	%	Seats	Total seats	+/–
Sandinista National Liberation Front	1,590,316	65.86	14	1,608,395	66.46	56	70	+7
Constitutionalist Liberal Party	369,342	15.30	3	375,432	15.51	10	13	+11
Independent Liberal Party	162,043	6.71	1	117,626	4.86	1	2	−25
Nicaraguan Liberal Alliance	137,541	5.70	1	137,078	5.66	1	2	+2
Conservative Party	106,027	4.39	1	110,568	4.57	0	1	+1
Alliance for the Republic	49,329	2.04	0	70,939	2.93	1	1	+1
YATAMA	–	–	–	30,901	1.28	1	1	−1
Special members (Note: The runner-up in the presidential election (Maximino Rodríguez of the Constitutionalist Liberal Party) and the outgoing president are special members of the National Assembly; as Ortega was re-elected, outgoing Vice President Omar Halleslevens of the FSLN, who was not Ortega's running mate in these elections (having been replaced by Rosario Murillo), will take up his seat.)	–	–	–	–	–	–	2	0
Invalid/blank votes		–	–		–	–	–	–
Total	2,414,598	100	20	2,450,939	100	70	92	0
Registered voters/turnout			–			–	–	–
Source: CSE, El 19 Digital

=== Municipal election results 1990–2017 ===
==== 1990 ====
The 1990 municipal election was held together with the presidential and the parliamentary elections on February 25. Municipal Councils were elected in 131 municipalities nationwide. The final results for the elections were:

- National Opposition Union (UNO) – 98 municipalities controlled
- Sandinista National Liberation Front (FSLN) – 31 municipalities controlled
- Central American Unionist Party (PUCA) – 2 municipalities controlled

==== 1996 ====
A great expectation in the 1996 municipal elections was the participation for the first (and last) time of what the Electoral Law terms "popular subscription associations". According to the Electoral Law, to be formed, an association needed, among other things, to present to the Supreme Electoral Council a "written request signed by a minimum of 5% of the citizens on the electoral rolls corresponding to the respective electoral area". A total of 53 associations participated in the municipal elections. One of them (the Civic Association of Potosí) won the mayor's post.

Despite winning only one municipality, an important number of association candidates finished in second or third place. In the nation's capital, Managua, two independent candidates; Pedro Solórzano of the Viva Managua Movement association and Herty Lewites of the Sol (sun) association competed against the AL and FSLN official candidates. ALN's Roberto Cedeño got the 28% of the votes followed closely by Solórzano with 26%, Carlos Guadamúz from the FSLN with 25.7% and Herty Lewites who became Managua's mayor four years later came in fourth place with 12.3%.

The 1996 municipal election took place together with the presidential election on October 20. Municipal Councils were elected in 145 municipalities nationwide. The final results for the elections were:

- Liberal Alliance (AL) – 92 municipalities controlled
- Sandinista National Liberation Front (FSLN) – 51 municipalities controlled
- Sandinista Renovation Movement (MRS) – 1 municipality controlled
- Civic Association of Potosí (ACP) – 1 municipality controlled

==== 2000 ====
In the 2000 municipal election 1,532,816 voters elected Municipal Councils in 151 municipalities nationwide. It was the first time that the presidential and municipal elections were held separately. The final results for the elections were:

- Constitutionalist Liberal Party (PLC) – 94 municipalities controlled
- Sandinista National Liberation Front (FSLN) – 52 municipalities controlled
- Conservative Party (PC) – 5 municipalities controlled

The FSLN won for the first time in ten years the municipality of Managua, Nicaragua's capital city with its candidate Herty Lewites that pulled 44% of the votes.

==== 2004 ====
In the 2004 municipal election 1,664,243 voters elected Municipal Councils in 152 municipalities nationwide, with nearly a 56% abstention. The final results for the elections were:

- Sandinista National Liberation Front (FSLN-Convergence) – 87 municipalities controlled
- Constitutionalist Liberal Party (PLC) – 57 municipalities controlled
- Alliance for the Republic (APRE) – 4 municipalities controlled
- Yapti Tasba Masraka Nanih Aslatakanka (YATAMA) – 3 municipalities controlled
- Nicaraguan Resistance Party (PRN) – 1 municipality controlled

Note: Elections took place for the first time in the newly created municipality of San José de Bocay in the Jinotega department.

The 2004 municipal elections represented a huge Sandinista victory. The FSLN-Convergence won 14 of the 17 departmental capitals, 87 of the 152 municipalities—including 5 of the 6 that make up Managua's greater metropolitan area—and 25 of Nicaragua's 42 largest cities. In total it will govern a little over 4 million inhabitants, nearly 71% of the national population.

The Sandinista victory was attributed to the success of the FSLN-Convergence alliance. Of the 87 mayors elected on the FSLN ticket, 17 come from these allies: 5 are independents, 3 are from the Resistance, 3 belong to the Sandinista Renovation Movement (MRS), 2 are Conservatives, 2 are Liberals, 1 is from the Christian Unity Movement (MUC) and 1 is a Social Christian. Of the deputy mayors who ran with an FSLN mayoral candidate, 28 are Liberals, 16 are independent, 14 are from the MUC, 9 are Conservatives, 9 are from the MRS, 3 are from the Resistance and 1 is a Social Christian. These allied candidates allowed the FSLN to win 12 municipal governments for the first time.

==== 2008 municipal elections ====
The 2008 elections were fraudulent. President Daniel Ortega limited access by international election monitors. The opposition criticized the conduct of the elections.

==== 2017 municipal elections ====
In the 2017 municipal election voters elected Municipal Councils in 153 municipalities nationwide, with around 53% turnout. The final results for the elections were:

- Sandinista National Liberation Front – 135 municipalities controlled
- Independent Liberal Party (PLI) – 12 municipalities controlled
- Yapti Tasba Masraka Nanih Aslatakanka (YATAMA) – 3 municipalities controlled
- Constitutionalist Liberal Party (PLC) – 2 municipalities controlled
- Nicaraguan Liberal Alliance – 1 municipality controlled

=== Autonomous elections on the Caribbean Coast results 1990–2014 ===
==== 1990 ====
The first autonomous elections on the Caribbean Coast took place in 1990 together with the presidential, parliamentary and municipal election on February 25. The voters elected the 45 Regional Council members in what was officially called the North Atlantic Autonomous Region (RAAN) and the 45 in the South Atlantic Autonomous Region (RAAS). The abstention was 21%, only 7% higher than the national average:

- Sandinista National Liberation Front (FSLN) – 39 seats (RAAN: 21, RAAS: 18)
- Yapti Tasba Masraka Nanih Aslatakanka (YATAMA) – 26 seats (RAAN: 22, RAAS: 4)
- National Opposition Union (UNO) – 25 seats (RAAN: 2, RAAS: 23)

Note: National Assembly representatives also have a seat.

==== 1994 ====
With an abstention of 34%, the inhabitants of the Atlantic Coast elected the 45 Regional Council members in what is officially called the North Atlantic Autonomous Region (RAAN) and the 45 in the South Atlantic Autonomous Region (RAAS) on February 27:

- Constitutionalist Liberal Party (PLC) – 37 seats (RAAN: 19, RAAS: 18)
- Sandinista National Liberation Front (FSLN) – 33 seats (RAAN: 19, RAAS: 14)
- Yapti Tasba Masraka Nanih Aslatakanka (YATAMA) – 12 seats (RAAN: 7, RAAS: 5)
- National Opposition Union (UNO) – 5 seats (RAAN: 0, RAAS: 5)
- Authentic Costeño Autonomy Movement (MAAC) – 2 seats (RAAN: 0, RAAS: 2)
- Costeño Democratic Alliance (ADECO) – 1 seat (RAAN: 0, RAAS: 1)

==== 1998 ====
With an abstention of 40%, the inhabitants of the Atlantic Coast elected the 45 Regional Council members in what is officially called the North Atlantic Autonomous Region (RAAN) and the 45 in the South Atlantic Autonomous Region (RAAS) on March 1.:

- Constitutionalist Liberal Party (PLC) – 44 seats (RAAN: 24, RAAS: 20)
- Sandinista National Liberation Front (FSLN) – 25 seats (RAAN: 13, RAAS: 12)
- Yapti Tasba Masraka Nanih Aslatakanka (YATAMA) – 12 seats (RAAN: 8, RAAS: 4)
- Multiethnic Indigenist Party (PIM) – 7 seats (RAAN: 0, RAAS: 7)
- Coast Alliance (Alianza Costeña) – 2 seats (RAAN: 0, RAAS: 2)

==== 2002 ====
With an overall abstention of 50–60%, inhabitants of the Atlantic Coast elected 90 Regional Council members on March 3:

- Constitutionalist Liberal Party (PLC) – 48 seats (RAAN: 17, RAAS: 31)
- Sandinista National Liberation Front (FSLN) – 28 seats (RAAN: 15, RAAS: 13)
- Yapti Tasba Masraka Nanih Aslatakanka (YATAMA) – 13 seats (RAAN: 12, RAAS: 1)
- Multiethnic Party for Coast Unity (PAMUC) – 1 seat (RAAN: 1, RAAS: 0)

==== 2006 ====
The fifth autonomous elections on the Caribbean Coast took place on March 5. The abstention was a record-high 55%. The voters elected the 45 Regional Council members in what was officially called the North Atlantic Autonomous Region (RAAN) and the 45 in the South Atlantic Autonomous Region (RAAS):

- Constitutionalist Liberal Party (PLC) – 40 seats (RAAN: 18, RAAS: 22)
- Sandinista National Liberation Front (FSLN) – 27 seats (RAAN: 15, RAAS: 12)
- Yapti Tasba Masraka Nanih Aslatakanka (YATAMA) – 18 seats (RAAN: 12, RAAS: 6)
- Nicaraguan Liberal Alliance-Conservative Party (ALN-PC) – 5 seats (RAAN: 0, RAAS: 5)

Three other parties did not pull enough votes to win a seat in the Regional Council; the regional Multiethnic Party for Coast Unity (PAMUC), the Sandinista Renovation Movement (MRS) alliance, and Alliance for the Republic (APRE).

==== 2010 ====
The sixth autonomous elections on the Caribbean Coast took place on March 7. The abstention rate was 60%. The voters elected 45 Regional Council members in the RAAN and 45 in the RAAS:

- Sandinista National Liberation Front (FSLN) – 41 seats (RAAN: 22, RAAS: 19)
- Constitutionalist Liberal Party (PLC) – 30 seats (RAAN: 10, RAAS: 20)
- Yapti Tasba Masraka Nanih Aslatakanka (YATAMA) – 16 seats (RAAN: 13, RAAS: 3)
- Nicaraguan Liberal Alliance (ALN) – 2 seats (RAAN: 0, RAAS: 2)
- Alliance for the Republic (APRE) – 1 seat (RAAN: 0, RAAS: 1)

==== 2014 ====
The seventh autonomous elections on the Caribbean Coast took place on March 2. The abstention rate was 59%. The voters elected 45 members to each Regional Council in the newly renamed North Caribbean Coast Autonomous Region (RACCN) and South Caribbean Coast Autonomous Region (RACCS):

- Sandinista National Liberation Front (FSLN) – 58 seats (RACCN: 28, RACCS: 30)
- Yapti Tasba Masraka Nanih Aslatakanka (YATAMA) – 15 seats (RACCN: 11, RACCS: 4)
- Independent Liberal Party (PLI) – 8 seats (RACCN: 5, RACCS: 3)
- Constitutionalist Liberal Party (PLC) – 7 seats (RACCN: 1, RACCS: 6)
- Multiethnic Indigenist Party (PIM) – 2 seats (RACCN: 0, RACCS: 2)

== See also ==
- Politics of Nicaragua
