= Costeño =

Costeño is the Spanish word for "coastal". It may refer to.

- Costeño cheese, cheese from the Colombian Caribbean region
- Costeño (train), former passenger train line between Guadalajara and Heroica Nogales, Mexico
- Authentic Costeño Autonomy Movement, regional Nicaraguan political party
- Costeño Democratic Alliance, regional Nicaraguan political party
- Coast Peoples' Party (Spanish: Partido de los Pueblos Costeños), regional Nicaraguan political party
- Peruvian Ribereño Spanish, also known as Español costeño peruano, Spanish dialect of coastal Peru
