= 2006 Nicaraguan general election =

- 5 November 2006
- Presidential election
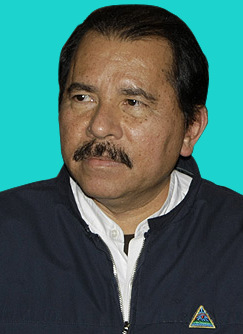

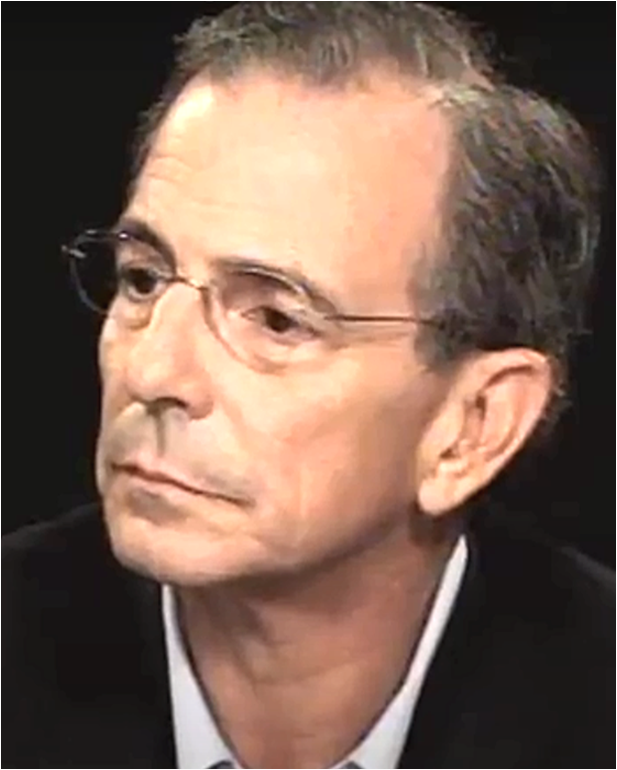

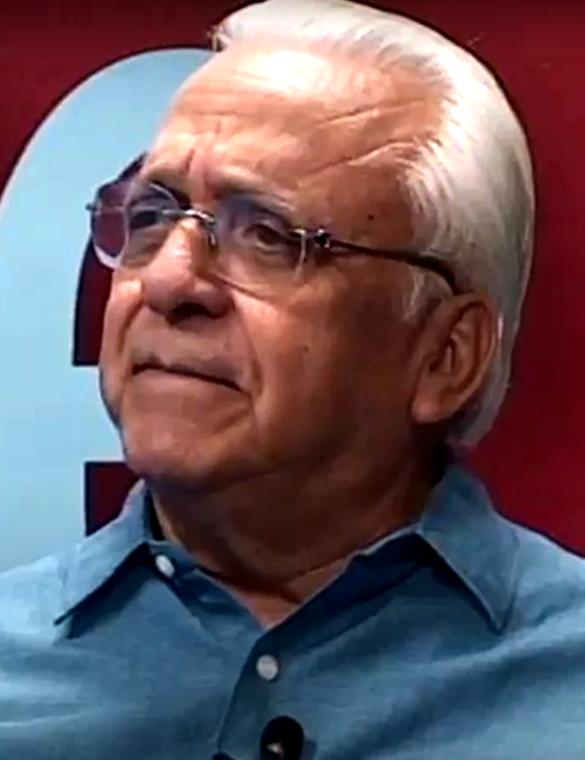
Candidate	Daniel Ortega	Eduardo Montealegre	José Rizo Castellón
Party	FSLN	ALN	PLC
Running mate	Jaime Morales	Fabricio Cajina	José Antonio Alvarado
Popular vote	854,316	650,879	588,304
Percentage	38.07%	29.00%	26.21%
- Results by department
President before election
Enrique Bolaños
PLC
Elected President
Daniel Ortega
FSLN
- Parliamentary election
- 90 seats in the National Assembly; 46 seats needed for a majority
Party	Leader	Vote %	Seats	+/–
FSLN	Daniel Ortega	37.90	38	+1
PLC	José Rizo Castellón	26.46	25	−27
ALN	Eduardo Montealegre	26.66	22	New
MRS	Edmundo Jarquín	8.42	5	New
This lists parties that won seats. See the complete results below.
President of the National Assembly before	President of the National Assembly after
Eduardo Goméz; PLC	René Nuñez; FSLN

General elections were held in Nicaragua on 5 November 2006. The country's voters went to the polls to elect a new President of the Republic and 90 members of the National Assembly. Daniel Ortega of the Sandinista National Liberation Front (FSLN) was elected president with 38% of the vote, defeating Eduardo Montealegre (Nicaraguan Liberal Alliance) with 28%, José Rizo (Constitutionalist Liberal Party) with 27%, Edmundo Jarquín (Sandinista Renovation Movement) with 6%, and Edén Pastora (Alternative for Change) with 0.3%. The FSLN also emerged as the largest party in the National Assembly, winning 38 seats.

The election have been characterized as a critical juncture in Nicaragua's history, as Nicaragua has experienced democratic backsliding since Ortega's victory in the election, as Ortega has centralized power and repressed the political opposition.

== Background ==
Right-wing political parties had dominated Nicaraguan politics since independence in 1838. Following the dissolution of the Legitimist party in 1851 and the Democratic party in 1936, the Liberals and Conservatives had alternated in government. The only exception to right-wing rule was the Sandinista government from 1979 to 1990.

The traditional two-party system, comprising the Sandinistas and the self-proclaimed Democratic Forces (anti-Sandinistas), remained for many years. Before the 2006 elections, the anti-Sandinista forces splintered into two major political alliances, the Nicaraguan Liberal Alliance (ALN) and the Constitutionalist Liberal Party (PLC). The Sandinistas faced internal divisions, with the dissident Sandinista Renovation Movement (MRS) gaining significant support from moderate Sandinistas and independent voters.

=== Electoral reforms in 2000 ===
The electoral reforms introduced in January 2000, as a result of the pact between the PLC and the FSLN, established new rules for the contending parties in the elections.

The required percentages to win the Presidential Election was reduced from 45 to 40 percent. The electoral law states that a participating candidate must obtain a relative majority of at least 40 percent of the vote to win a presidential election. However, a candidate may win by obtaining at least 35 percent of the vote, with at least a five percent margin over the second-place finisher. The law also established a second-round runoff election if none of the candidates won in the first round.

In addition, a party could also lose its legal status if it obtains less than 4 percent of the votes in the general elections.

== Presidential candidates ==
=== Alternative for Change ===
President: Edén Pastora

Edén Pastora, the former Sandinista Deputy Defense Minister (1979–1981), was the presidential candidate for the Nicaraguan Democratic Action Party (PAD) in 1996. The Supreme Electoral Council (CSE) barred him from running for the presidency on the grounds that he had Costa Rican nationality. In the 2004 municipal elections, Pastora was running for mayor of Managua on the Independent Liberal Party's ticket. Pastora got less than 5% of the votes.

Vice-president: Mercedes Tenorio

Mercedes Tenorio, a Nicaraguan nurse, is Pastora's running mate. Tenorio was an active member of the Sandinista Health Workers' Federation (FETSALUD).

=== Constitutionalist Liberal Party ===
PLC logo

President: José Rizo

José Rizo, co-founder of the PLC, and his running mate José Antonio Alvarado, who were also citizens of Chile and the United States, respectively, were prohibited from participating in the 1996 elections by the Supreme Electoral Council (CSE). In 1997, under the government of Arnoldo Alemán, Rizo was appointed president of the Nicaraguan Institute for Municipal Development (INIFOM). After the reforms to the Electoral Law in the year 2000, part of the pact between the PLC and the FSLN, Rizo was able to contest the 2001 elections where he was elected vice-president, running on the PLC ticket.

Vice-president: José Antonio Alvarado

José Antonio Alvarado, one of the founders of the PLC, and later expelled from it for his dissidence to Alemán, held various ministerial portfolios during both the Alemán and Bolaños administration. Like his running mate, the CSE excluded him from participating in the 2001 elections as the vice-presidential candidate of the Conservative Party. In late August 2005, Eduardo Montealegre, the ALN's presidential candidate, invited Alvarado to join him as his vice-president. Alvarado was elected the presidential candidate of the Alliance for the Republic (APRE) in the primaries held in May 2006 with about 82% of the votes. Shortly after APRE joined the ALN alliance and Alvarado went back to the PLC.

=== Nicaraguan Liberal Alliance ===
President: Eduardo Montealegre

Eduardo Montealegre, a former banker and economist, is the youngest and wealthiest of the five candidates. Like Alvarado, he held various ministerial portfolios during both the Alemán and Bolaños administration, including Foreign Minister with Alemán and Treasury Minister under Bolaños government. After his expulsion from the PLC he founded the ALN together with other dissidents. Montealgre's adversaries have criticized him for his involvement in the CENI bond operation – now a substantial part of the domestic debt – after several banks got into financial problems due to fraudulent practices over the course of 1999–2001.

Vice-president: Fabricio Cajina

Fabricio Cajina, an agricultural producer, was the Conservative mayor of San José de los Remates (2000–2004) in the department of Boaco.

=== Sandinista National Liberation Front ===
President: Daniel Ortega

Daniel Ortega, coordinator of the Junta of National Reconstruction (1979–1985), ascended to the presidency after the 1984 elections. Ortega, general secretary of the Sandinista National Liberation Front, was President of Nicaragua from 1985 to 1990 and presidential candidate of the FSLN in 1990, 1996, 2001, and 2006. Prominent Sandinista leaders have left the party or have been expelled for dissenting to Ortega's power. Despite all, Ortega is pulling in first place in the polls.

Vice-president: Jaime Morales Carazo

Jaime Morales Carazo, the civilian chief of the Contras in the 1980s and Alemán's right-hand man for many years, was one of the founders of the PLC and liberal legislator in the National Assembly until 2006. Morales Carazo began to distance himself politically from Alemán and the PLC once Bolaños came to office and launched his “war on corruption.”

=== Sandinista Renovation Movement ===
President: Edmundo Jarquín

Edmundo Jarquín was the MRS vice-presidential candidate. He took over as presidential candidate after the initial nominee, Herty Lewites, died suddenly of a heart attack on 3 July 2006. Jarquín founded in 1974, together with Pedro Joaquín Chamorro, editor of newspaper La Prensa, the Democratic Liberation Union (UDEL) in the struggle against the Somoza regime. Jarquín was head of the Ministry of Foreign Cooperation between 1981–84 and ambassador to Mexico (1984–88) and to Spain (1988–1990). In the 1990 elections he gained a seat in the National Assembly. Jarquín worked as an Inter-American Development Bank (IDB) official from 1992 to 2005 when he resigned and joined the MRS electoral alliance.

Vice-president: Carlos Mejía Godoy

Carlos Mejía Godoy is an internationally known and popular Nicaraguan singer-songwriter who stepped in as the vice-presidential candidate after Lewites died. Mejía Godoy is the father of Camilo Mejía, one of the most famous conscientious objectors to the US war in Iraq.

== Contending parties and electoral alliances ==
=== Alternative for Change ===
The Alternative for Change (Spanish: Alternativa por el Cambio – AC) was part of the MRS Alliance for a few months, but decided to go alone to the elections with presidential candidate Edén Pastora. Alternative for Change was founded by dissidents from the Nicaraguan Party of the Christian Path (CCN) and a few stray Sandinistas, which first went under the name Christian Alternative led by former Sandinista legislator Orlando Tardencilla.

=== Constitutionalist Liberal Party ===
The Constitutionalist Liberal Party (Spanish: Partido Liberal Constitucionalista – PLC) is in alliance with the Worker's Permanent Congress (CPT), a civil organisation formed around several smaller parties, labor unions, and political movements.

=== Nicaraguan Liberal Alliance ===
The Nicaraguan Liberal Alliance (Spanish: Alianza Liberal Nicaragüense – ALN) is formed by dissidents of the Constitutionalist Liberal Party and the Conservative Party (PC), Alliance for the Republic (APRE), Independent Liberal Party (PLI), Nicaraguan Resistance Party (PRN) and the Nicaraguan Party of the Christian Path (CCN).

=== Sandinista National Liberation Front ===
After the break-up of the FSLN-Convergence alliance in 2005, the Sandinista National Liberation Front (Spanish: Frente Sandinista de Liberación Nacional – FSLN) formed the United Nicaragua Triumphs alliance. The allied political forces of the FSLN are; Yapti Tasba Masraka Nanih Aslatakanka (YATAMA), the indigenous party from Nicaragua's Caribbean coast, Christian Democratic Union (UDC), Christian Unity Movement (MUC), Popular Conservative Alliance (APC) and a few smaller organisations of dissidents from the Liberal and Conservative Party and a fraction of members from the Nicaraguan Resistance Party, including members of the PLN, Somoza's Liberal Party.

=== Sandinista Renovation Movement ===
The Sandinista Renovation Movement (Spanish: Movimiento de Renovación Sandinista – MRS), also known as the Herty 2006 Alliance in allusion to Herty Lewites, the alliance original presidential candidate, runs in this election together with the Social Christian Party (PSC), Nicaraguan Socialist Party (PSN), Ecologist Green Party of Nicaragua (PVEN), Party for Citizen Action (PAC), the Movement for the Rescue of the Sandinismo and the Change-Reflection-Ethic-Action Movement (CREA). Various social groups are also part of the alliance, the most organized and belligerent of which is the Autonomous Women’s Movement.

== Campaign ==
=== Primaries ===
==== Sandinistas ====
The Sandinista Assembly – FSLN's highest decision-making body – was held on 26 February in Managua. Lewites had announced that he planned a march to the site of the event with his followers in support of his running against Daniel Ortega for the candidacy. Some 200 meters from the gates of the “Olofito” convention center where the Sandinista Assembly was meeting, they were stopped by a larger pro-Ortega demonstration. For several minutes both groups went at each other with fists, stones, and even clubs. The police had to intervene, placing themselves between the rival bands. In the Assembly, the official leadership responded by expelling Herty Lewites and his campaign chief Víctor Hugo Tinoco from the party.

A few days later, on 6 March, an extraordinary FSLN congress was held in Matagalpa. The outcome of this congress was the annulment of primary elections and the proclamation of Daniel Ortega as the presidential candidate, successfully blocking Lewites' presidential aspirations. The Sandinista grass roots would no longer be consulted on their choice for presidential candidate through primary elections. As Ortega himself pointed out: "The truth is that primary elections cause a lot of problems due to the enormous erosion and friction they cause among Sandinistas."

Pro-Ortega legislators are running for reelection together with cadres from the party structures and a few political figures from what is left of the FSLN's Convergence alliance, such as Social Christian Agustín Jarquín, Conservative Miriam Argüello and Liberal Julia Mena, all former opponents of Ortega.

Lewites went on to form the Movement for the Rescue of the Sandinismo, who joined the MRS Alliance to support Lewites as the presidential candidate for the Nicaraguan general election, 2006. The MRS Alliance chose their legislative candidates based on surveys and bilateral contacts with their partners in the MRS Alliance.

==== Liberals ====
In the light of PLC’s victory in the Atlantic coast elections of March 2006, the PLC announced it would not hold primary elections to select its presidential candidate, arguing lack of finances. Instead the 750 party delegates from all over the country would do the selecting at the PLC National Convention on 2 April. On 22 March, Alemán suddenly announces a form of primary election with 32 simultaneous conventions in the country’s 16 departments on 31 March, and the winner would be ratified two days later during the National Convention.

PLC leaders also invited all dissident Liberals outside the PLC to participate in these primaries, voting for the candidate they consider best able to defeat the FSLN, then rejoining the fold come what may. José Rizo won the PLC primary elections.

The ALN held also primary elections, but gave preference to unelected candidates, among them some of their allies in APRE, PC and the PRN. Montealegre also attempted – up to the last minute – to bring some pro-Alemán leaders over to his side. He was only successful with Pedro Joaquín Chamorro Barrios, son of Violeta Barrios de Chamorro and former PLC candidate for Mayor of Managua.

=== Pre-campaign ===
The Atlantic coast elections of March 2006 were an opportunity for the parties and candidates competing in the general election to show their strength. The results gave the PLC a significant victory with 40 seats out of 90 in the Regional Councils. The FSLN and its ally YATAMA got 45 seats between them both and the ALN got the remaining five. The MRS Alliance didn't pull enough votes to win a seat in the Regional Council.

=== Issues ===
One of the most important issues raised in the 2006 elections was the economy. The high external debt and internal debt have inhibited growth. Around 75% of the population lives on less than US$2 a day, unemployment and underemployment are close to 50%, and income inequality is very pronounced. However, there have been some recent improvements. Real economic growth declined from 7.4% in 1999 to 1% in 2002, then turned around to grow back to 2.3% in 2003, and about 4% in 2004.

Another important issue was the pact established by the PLC and the FSLN in 2000 in order to maintain control over key institutions such as the Supreme Court (CSJ) and the Supreme Electoral Council (CSE), causing a profound institutional crisis in the Nicaraguan society. Both the two major anti-pact forces (ALN and MRS), and more recently, the PLC candidate, Rizo, made public their intentions to dismantle the pact. Truth is that a "qualified majority" of 2/3 in the National Assembly is needed to revert the 2000 reforms and this is not likely to happen according to the latest polls.

==== Abortion becomes a Campaign Issue ====
In late August, the Sandinista Renovation Movement (MRS) candidate Edmundo Jarquín stated that he supported therapeutic abortion when the life of the mother is at risk. Abortion under these circumstances had been legal in Nicaragua since 1891. Abortion other than therapeutic is punishable by imprisonment from one to three years.

The religious sector condemned Jarquín's statement, prompting the other four of the five presidential candidates to declare themselves against abortion. The FSLN, which has an important relationship with former Managua Archbishop Miguel Obando, stated in general that they opposed abortion and were pro-life. This was a reversal of traditional Sandinista policy.

The Catholic Church organised a march on the National Assembly on 6 October to demand that therapeutic abortion be criminalized in the penal code. A march took place a few days later, organized by the Autonomous Women's Movement, a pro-choice organization that is part of the MRS Alliance.

On 15 October, President Bolaños sent to the National Assembly a draft on a proposed reform of the penal code in order to penalize therapeutic abortion. The National Assembly passed the law banning therapeutic abortions on 26 October 2006. It is widely expected that the president will sign it. A section of the law raising prison sentences for women undergoing abortions or doctors performing them from up to six years to up to 30 years was not passed.

==== Electoral programmes ====
In Spanish:

- Alternative for Change
- Constitutionalist Liberal Party
- Nicaraguan Liberal Alliance
- Sandinista National Liberation Front
- Sandinista Renovation Movement

=== The U.S. and the Nicaraguan elections ===
U.S. officials have openly opposed Daniel Ortega's and José Rizo's candidacies, and supported Eduardo Montealegre and Sandinista dissident Edmundo Jarquín. U.S. Representative Dan Burton, U.S. Commerce Secretary Carlos Gutierrez and Ambassador Paul Trivelli have all stated that an Ortega victory could scare off foreign investors and threaten Nicaragua's relations with the United States.

The Organization of American States (OAS) mission in Nicaragua told the U.S. government not to meddle in Nicaragua's presidential election in October.

=== Finances ===
According to the Nicaraguan Electoral Law, the parties are forced to report most donations, but only those received from the date of the official opening of the campaign (19 August) to the day of the elections (5 November). Minor individual donations do not need to be disclosed. The parties will be refunded after the elections in proportion to the number of votes each of them obtain.

A pre-campaign study carried out by the independent Ethic and Transparency Civic Group between 1 July and 15 August, showed that the FSLN was the party that spent the most money during that period; C$ 7,858,120. ALN came in second with C$ 3,153,571 followed by the PLC with C$ 2,622,635. The MRS spent C$ 824,718 and the AC had the smallest budget with C$ 535,624.

According to the ALN official, Eliseo Núñez, the party estimates its budget for the whole campaign in US$6 to 8 million. José Rizo's budget is also estimated in about $6 million. Edén Pastora and his AC will have an austere campaign with a $500,000 budget.

Both the left and the right have made allegations that their political opponents have received funding from the United States and Venezuela respectively.

The United States is investing between $10 and 13 million in the Nicaraguan elections providing support to the Supreme Electoral Council (CSE), the Organisation of American States (OAS) election observer mission, and in the training of ALN and MRS election officials.

On the other hand, the Sandinista Mayor of Managua, Dionisio Marenco, negotiated an agreement with the Venezuelan state oil company PDVSA that allows Venezuelan oil to be imported directly to Nicaragua with preferential payment conditions. The first shipment of a total of 10 million barrels of oil (equivalent to the total annual demand in Nicaragua) arrived to the country in October 2005. Nicaragua is in the middle of an energy crisis with increasing oil prices and a strict energy rationalization policy that leaves hundreds of thousands of Nicaraguan without power supply for several hours a day.

=== Forum ===
Early in September, CNN organized a television encounter between the presidential candidates, inviting all five to participate. Daniel Ortega refused to take part leaving the "debate" to the remaining four; Eduardo Montealegre, José Rizo, Edmundo Jarquín, and Edén Pastora.

== Opinion polls ==
=== President ===
Borge & Asociados – Polls Conducted October 15–22^{2}, October 5–12^{1}, September 13, and August 5, 2006

Party	Candidate	October 2006^{2}	October 2006^{1}	September 2006	August 2006	June 2006	May 2006	February 2006
FSLN	Daniel Ortega	34.4%	30.6%	26.8%	31.4%	30.1%	28.4%	18.3%
ALN	Eduardo Montealegre	23.0%	22.4%	23.9%	29.1%	24.4%	26.5%	21.7%
MRS	Herty Lewites (until 2 July 2006) Edmundo Jarquín	10.9%	10.1%	19.1%	15.2%	17.3%	14.8%	27.3%
PLC	José Rizo	19.3%	14.6%	16.4%	15.7%	21.6%	17.1%	N/A
AC	Edén Pastora	0.9%	0.4%	0.5%	1.1%	1.0%	1.3%	N/A
N/A	Don't know/Didn't answer	11.5%	11.9%	13.3%	7.5%	5.6%	11.9%	N/A

October poll sample size is 1,800. The margin of error is 3.2%. June poll sample size is 1,008. The Margin of error is 3.2%.

CID-Gallup – Poll Conducted October, 2006 and August 16 to 19, 2006

Party	Candidate	October 2006	August 2006
FSLN	Daniel Ortega	32.5%	29%
ALN	Eduardo Montealegre	21.1%	23%
MRS	Herty Lewites (until 2 July 2006) Edmundo Jarquín	11.8%	14%
PLC	José Rizo	16.8%	14%
AC	Edén Pastora	0.2%	1%
N/A	Don't know/Didn't answer	17.6%	19%

The October poll sample size is 5,090. The margin of error is 2%. August poll sample size is 1,258. Methodology: Telephone interviews. Margin of error is 2.8%.

=== Parliamentary election ===
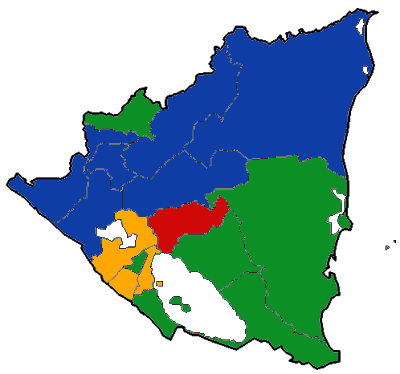
Map showing the results of the Parliamentary election poll by department. FSLN majority. ALN-PC majority. MRS majority. PLC majority.

The elections of 90 representatives to the National Assembly will also be held on November 5. According to the September poll by M & R Consultores no party will gain enough seats to form a majority.

Party	September 2006	Seats
FSLN	34.7%	35
ALN	28.1%	29
MRS	17.9%	14
PLC	18.1%	12
AC	1.2%	0

According to M & R, the FSLN polls first on 7 of the country's 17 departments, mostly on northern and western Nicaragua. ALN-PC is number one on 6 departments in southern and eastern Nicaragua, including the Southern Autonomous Region (R.A.A.S.). The MRS party leads the polls on 3 departments including the nation's capital, Managua, and the PLC polls first in the department of Boaco.

UCA – Sponsored by END, Canal 10, CNC – October, 2006

Party	October 2006	Seats
FSLN	37.30%	40
ALN	16.06%	19
MRS	14.03%	12
PLC	20.50%	19
AC	2.72%	0
Don't know/Didn't answer	9.37%	N/A

According to this poll, the FSLN wins in nine departments, four of them with an absolute majority (over 50% of the intended votes). The ALN-PC comes in second place winning in four departments, the PLC third with three departments and in last place, the MRS being number one only in one department (Carazo).

== Conduct ==
The results of the election were recognized by the international community. The Carter Center, an independent observer sent a 62-member delegation and found "the election administration to be adequate, with improvements over past electoral processes."

== Results ==
=== President ===
Candidate	Running mate	Party	Votes	%
Daniel Ortega	Jaime Morales Carazo	Sandinista National Liberation Front	854,316	38.07
Eduardo Montealegre	Fabricio Cajina	Nicaraguan Liberal Alliance	650,879	29.00
José Rizo Castellón	Jose Antonio Alvarado	Constitutionalist Liberal Party	588,304	26.21
Edmundo Jarquín	Carlos Mejía	Sandinista Renovation Movement	144,596	6.44
Edén Pastora	Mercedes Tenorio	Alternative for Change	6,120	0.27
Total			2,244,215	100.00
Registered voters/turnout			3,665,141	–
Source: IFES

==== By department ====
Department/ Autonomous region	Ortega		Montealegre		Rizo		Jarquín		Pastora	
Department/ Autonomous region	Votes	%	Votes	%	Votes	%	Votes	%	Votes	%
Boaco	14,978	26.2%	14,773	25.9%	26,279	46.0%	903	1.6%	156	0.3%
Carazo	28,749	37.8%	27,291	35.9%	10,878	14.3%	8,905	11.7%	208	0.3%
Chinandega	82,985	47.6%	63,975	36.7%	18,765	10.8%	8,143	4.6%	391	0.2%
Chontales	19,616	26.4%	25,530	34.3%	28,051	37.7%	1,056	1.4%	130	0.2%
Estelí	48,012	46.8%	24,211	23.6%	26,575	25.9%	3,616	3.5%	161	0.2%
Granada	27,464	33.6%	33,714	41.2%	13,379	16.3%	7,048	8.6%	250	0.3%
Jinotega	47,089	35.2%	22,851	17.1%	61,773	46.2%	1,721	1.3%	270	0.2%
León	75,948	46.0%	51,512	31.2%	26,290	15.9%	10,820	6.6%	449	0.3%
Madriz	31,773	46.7%	9,503	14.0%	25,831	38.0%	822	1.2%	74	0.1%
Managua	217,060	35.9%	189,759	31.4%	115,865	19.1%	79,967	13.2%	2,390	0.4%
Masaya	49,158	36.2%	50,549	37.3%	23,553	17.3%	12,155	8.9%	355	0.3%
Matagalpa	76,162	40.8%	32,723	17.5%	74,375	39.9%	2,898	1.6%	464	0.2%
Nueva Segovia	37,143	43.5%	18,950	22.2%	28,023	32.8%	1,257	1.5%	97	0.1%
Río San Juan	13,527	34.0%	5,391	13.5%	20,548	51.6%	237	6.0%	96	0.2%
Rivas	30,341	39.1%	34,177	43.9%	10,288	13.2%	2,835	3.6%	154	0.2%
North Caribbean Coast	31,502	40.9%	14,112	18.3%	30,640	39.7%	589	0.8%	245	0.3%
South Caribbean Coast	22,719	21.9%	31,813	30.7%	47,191	45.6%	1,624	1.6%	230	0.2%
Source: Adam Carr

=== National Assembly ===
Party	National			Departmental			Total seats	+/–
Party	Votes	%	Seats	Votes	%	Seats	Total seats	+/–
Sandinista National Liberation Front	840,851	37.59	8	847,565	37.90	30	38	+1
Nicaraguan Liberal Alliance	597,709	26.72	4	596,281	26.66	18	22	New
Constitutionalist Liberal Party	592,118	26.47	8	591,805	26.46	17	25	–27
Sandinista Renovation Movement	194,416	8.69	0	188,335	8.42	5	5	New
Alternative for Change	12,053	0.54	0	12,354	0.55	0	0	New
Special members (Note: The runner-up in the presidential election (Eduardo Montealegre of the ALN) and the outgoing president Enrique Bolaños Geyer (independent) are special members of the National Assembly.)							2	0
Total	2,237,147	100.00	20	2,236,340	100.00	70	92	0
Registered voters/turnout	3,665,141	–						
Source: IFES, Election Passport, Psephos

== See also ==
- Elections in Nicaragua
- List of political parties in Nicaragua
- Politics of Nicaragua
