= Mercedes Tenorio =

Nicaraguan politician (born 1956)

Mercedes Tenorio (born November 11, 1956, Rivas), a Nicaraguan nurse, was Edén Pastora's running mate in the 2006 Nicaraguan general election for the Alternative for Change party. Tenorio was an active member of the Sandinista Health Workers' Federation (FETSALUD).
