= Elí Altamirano =

Nicaraguan politician and trade unionist

Eli Altamirano Pérez (27 February 1934 – 15 January 2016) was a Nicaraguan politician and trade unionist. He served as the general secretary of the Communist Party of Nicaragua for a quarter century.

== Biography ==
Altamirano was born in Chinandega on February 27, 1934. His parents were Angel Maria Altamirano Gutierrez and Mercedes Perez Altamirano. He studied up to the fourth grade at the Escuela Superior de Varones in Chinandega.

In 1956 Altamirano was jailed thrice, during the wave of repression that took place after the killing of Anastasio Somoza García. In the same year he began organizing a union for mechanics and metal workers in Managua. He became a member of the Nicaraguan Socialist Party (PSN) in 1959. In 1960 he became a member of the leadership of the Federacion de Trabajadores de Managua. In 1961 he founded the Socialist Youth of Nicaragua, the PSN youth wing. He became a member of the central leadership of the Confederación General del Trabajo (independiente) trade union centre in 1962. He stayed in exile in Cuba between April 1963 and March 1964, after which he left for studies in Moscow.

He took part a split in PSN in early 1967, and took part in founding the Socialist Workers Party of Nicaragua (POSN) in October 1967. He spent eight month in jail in 1968. Upon his release he was named general secretary of POSN. Taking over the control of POSN, he expelled the older leadership. In December 1970 POSN held its constitutive congress, adopting the name Communist Party of Nicaragua and electing Altamirano as its general secretary. Under Altamirano's leadership the Communist Party took an anti-Sandinista stance, isolating itself from the broader revolutionary movement. Within the party a personality cult around Altamirano began to emerge. In October 1971 he founded the newspaper Avance, and became its chief editor. In 1973 he founded the Central de Acción y Unificación Sindical trade union centre. He was the coordinator of the United People's Movement (Movimiento Pueblo Unido).

At the time of the fall of Somoza, Altamirano was imprisoned. He had been arrested in April 1979 and sentenced to six months imprisonment. He was released after the victory of the revolution on July 19, 1979.

After the revolution, Altamirano sought to push the political process into a leftward direction. CAUS organized a strike on factory workers in March 1980, provoking reaction from the new Sandinista government. Altamirano and other CAUS leaders were arrested. He was accused of participating in a CIA destabilization plot. Altamirano was arrested along with other Communist Party and CAUS leaders on October 21, 1981 and sentenced to seven months imprisonment for violating the Public Order Law. He was recognized as a prisoner of conscience by Amnesty International.

Altamirano was elected deputy of the National Opposition Union (UNO) in the 1990 elections. Within UNO, Altamirano was particularly close to Virgilio Godoy.

Altamirano stood as candidate for president in the 1996 Nicaraguan general election. He obtained 4,802 votes (0.27% of the national vote).

After 1996 Altamirano largely retired from public affairs. However, he remained as the leader of the party, albeit he struggled with health issues late in life. Altamirano died in early 2016, but his death was kept secret for almost a month.
