= La Libertad, Nicaragua =

La Libertad
- Municipality
- Location in Nicaragua
- Coordinates: 12°13′N 85°10′W
- Country: Nicaragua
- Department: Chontales Department

Area
  - Municipality: 299 sq mi (775 km^{2})

Population (2005)
  - Municipality: 11,429
  - Density: 38.2/sq mi (14.7/km^{2})
  - Urban: 4,887

La Libertad (Spanish pronunciation: [la liβeɾˈtað]) is a municipality in the Chontales Department of Nicaragua. It is the birthplace of President Daniel Ortega, Cardinal Miguel Obando y Bravo, and Vice President Omar Halleslevens. It has a population of 14,712 people.

== Geography ==
La Libertad is located 32 kilometers from the municipality of Juigalpa and 175 kilometers from the capital, Managua. The municipality is bordered to the north by the municipality of Camoapa, to the south by the municipality of San Pedro de Lóvago, to the east by the municipalities of Santo Domingo and El Ayote, and to the west by the municipalities of Juigalpa and Cuapa. The municipality of La Libertad is also located in the northern part of the department of Chontales, between the Amerrisque mountain range and the rivers that descend towards the plains of the municipalities of Santo Domingo, San Pedro de Lóvago, and El Ayote.

=== Climate ===
Climate data for La Libertad, Nicaragua (1971–1990)
Month	Jan	Feb	Mar	Apr	May	Jun	Jul	Aug	Sep	Oct	Nov	Dec	Year
Mean daily maximum °C (°F)	25.7 (78.3)	26.9 (80.4)	28.9 (84.0)	30.3 (86.5)	30.3 (86.5)	27.8 (82.0)	26.8 (80.2)	27.3 (81.1)	27.8 (82.0)	27.4 (81.3)	26.8 (80.2)	25.8 (78.4)	27.7 (81.9)
Daily mean °C (°F)	24.0 (75.2)	23.1 (73.6)	24.3 (75.7)	25.3 (77.5)	25.8 (78.4)	24.4 (75.9)	23.8 (74.8)	24.2 (75.6)	24.4 (75.9)	24.1 (75.4)	23.6 (74.5)	22.8 (73.0)	24.2 (75.6)
Mean daily minimum °C (°F)	19.0 (66.2)	19.1 (66.4)	19.5 (67.1)	20.2 (68.4)	21.1 (70.0)	21.0 (69.8)	20.9 (69.6)	21.0 (69.8)	20.9 (69.6)	20.9 (69.6)	20.5 (68.9)	19.8 (67.6)	20.3 (68.5)
Average precipitation mm (inches)	65 (2.6)	34 (1.3)	26 (1.0)	29 (1.1)	142 (5.6)	262 (10.3)	271 (10.7)	245 (9.6)	211 (8.3)	186 (7.3)	124 (4.9)	92 (3.6)	1,687 (66.4)
Average precipitation days (≥ 1.0 mm)	13	8	6	5	11	21	24	22	19	18	15	15	177
Source: National Oceanic and Atmospheric Administration

== History ==
=== Settlement ===
Due to the abundant wealth of indigenous place names in the current territory of La Libertad, it is believed that the first inhabitants were of Mayangna-Carib origin, who were displaced by the Chontales people. The last Carib settlement was "El Jobo," located 2 kilometers west of the current city, abandoned in 1730 due to dysentery that decimated its inhabitants.

Between 1710-1817, Spaniards and mestizos arrived, promoting extensive cattle ranching. They discovered that the natives were washing gold sands from the Mico River, which caused immigration of nationals and foreigners and led to the creation of the "El Mineral" settlement. Years later, the town was named "La Trinidad" after three brothers with the surname Conrado who arrived and stayed. Another version is that the first authorities were three honorable people with the same name "Miguel," who used a single official signature "La Trinidad." According to the historian Jerónimo Pérez (1838–1878), El Mineral was renamed "La Libertad" by a gambler, Conrado, who told his friends pursued by the Police: "Let's go to El Mineral; there is freedom to gamble, drink, and everything." Soon after, the name La Libertad became widespread.From a historical point of view, there are no known data to certify the name and founding date (since there is no information from the National Archives), but La Libertad was founded between 1816 and 1852.

The municipality was incorporated as a town in 1855. La Libertad was elevated to the rank of villa in 1886. During the administration of Doctor and General José Santos Zelaya, through Executive Decree published in the "Diario de Nicaragua" No. 111 (old name of La Gaceta, Official Gazette) on Wednesday, March 13, 1895, page 2, La Libertad was elevated to city status along with Boaco; while Camoapa was elevated to villa.

== Demographics ==
La Libertad has a current population of 14,712 inhabitants. Of the total population, 50.9% are men and 49.1% are women. Almost 46.2% of the population lives in the urban area.

== Territorial Organization ==
The municipal seat is located south of "La Cruz" hill and on the banks of the Mico River. It is made up of three districts that encompass four zones and aggregate seven neighborhoods: Tasbapriss Neighborhood, "Camilo Ortega" Development, "Villa Hermosa," "La Nueva Esperanza," "San Luis" Neighborhood, "La Luz," "La Sapera," and "Concepción de María" Neighborhood.

Its rural territory is subdivided into 25 communities with their corresponding population settlements: El Castillo, Cuscuás, Palmira, Tawa Arriba, Tawa Abajo, El Sabalar, Timulí, Amores del Sol, Carquita, El Parlamento, El Zancudo, Arenas, Pijibaye, Betulia, El Chamarro, El Escándalo, San Francisco del Coyol, San Francisco del Gamalote, El Espejo, Zapote de Oriente, Zapote de Occidente, Cosmatillo, San Buenaventura, Kinuma, and Río Mico.

== Economy ==
The economy of the municipality of La Libertad is fundamentally defined by its two most important economic riches, composed of livestock and cattle farming in the rural areas, and the mining of gold and silver in the urban and sub-urban areas. Broadly speaking, its inhabitants are dispersed across the vast territory as small conglomerates, in three mountain ports (Betulia, Carquita, and Palmira), in three cooperative settlements (San Marcos, Las Praderas, La Victoria), and in places adjacent to farms. It is extremely important to highlight larger-scale mining operations such as the Minisa Mining Company and, on a smaller scale, the Cooperative of Small Miners Production (Cooppemilich R.L.). The main economic activities of the municipality are agriculture, livestock, mining, and commerce. La Libertad is also home to the largest open-pit mine in Nicaragua, which processes six thousand tons of earth and rocks each day.

== Notable people ==
- Miguel Obando y Bravo, S.D.B. Cardinal of the Catholic Church, the first cardinal of Central America, Archbishop Emeritus of the Archdiocese of Managua, and who was Auxiliary Bishop of the Diocese of Matagalpa. Declared a National Hero by the National Assembly of Nicaragua.
- Daniel Ortega, guerrilla and politician: President of the Republic of Nicaragua (1985–1990, 2007–2012, 2012–2017, 2017–2022, and 2022–2027); General Secretary of the FSLN (1991–); commander of the Sandinista Popular Revolution; guerrilla leader in the Northern Front "Carlos Fonseca".
- Rigoberto Cruz, teacher, university professor, founder of the FLN (National Liberation Front) and mythical Sandinista guerrilla known as "Pablo Úbeda".
- Omar Halleslevens, military commander and politician: Vice President of the Republic of Nicaragua (2012–2017); Commander-in-Chief of the EPS (2005–2010); Guerrilla Commander of the Sandinista Popular Revolution (1974–1979).
- Walberto López Tenorio (1935–1973), table tennis athlete, National Champion undefeated for 18 consecutive years (1956–1973) (record); Central American Champion for 5 consecutive years (1961–1965); North America, Central America, and the Caribbean Champion (NORCECA 1966).
- Carlos Garzón, goldsmith and entrepreneur, founder and owner of the famous "Joyería Garzón".

== Twin towns – sister cities ==
La Libertad is Twinned with

(Netherlands) Doetinchem
