= ADECO =

ADECO or Adeco may refer to:

- Associação Desportiva Centro Olímpico, a Brazilian women's soccer team
- Costeño Democratic Alliance, a Nicaraguan regional political party
