= Avance (newspaper) =

- Type: Weekly
- Publisher: Communist Party of Nicaragua
- Editor: Elí Altamirano
- Founded: October 1971
- Headquarters: Managua
- OCLC number: 145395187

Avance ('Advance') was a newspaper published in Nicaragua, the central organ of the Communist Party of Nicaragua. Founded in October 1971 by Elí Altamirano. Altamirano, also serving as the main leader of the party, served as its editor for decades.

Avance was shut down by the government for a period in 1980 early, as it had called for strikes. By late February 1980 Avance was officially branded as 'counter-revolutionary' in the government discourse.

As of the 1980s and early 1990s Avance was published weekly. As of the late 1980s, Avance generally carried twelve pages. The Communist Party claimed that Avance had a circulation of 20,000 copies, but that figure was believed to have been heavily inflated at the time.

Avance was almost entirely dedicated to political themes, and expressed a militant anti-Sandinista stance. However, albeit the Communist Party had participated in the UNO coalition of Violeta Chamorro in the 1990 general election, Avance expressed criticisms against Chamorro's government for alleged failures in providing services to the poorer sectors in Managua.

In later years, the Communist Party has published occasional issues of Avance.

== See also ==
- List of newspapers in Venezuela
