= Reyna Rueda =

Nicaraguan politician

Reyna Rueda Alvarado
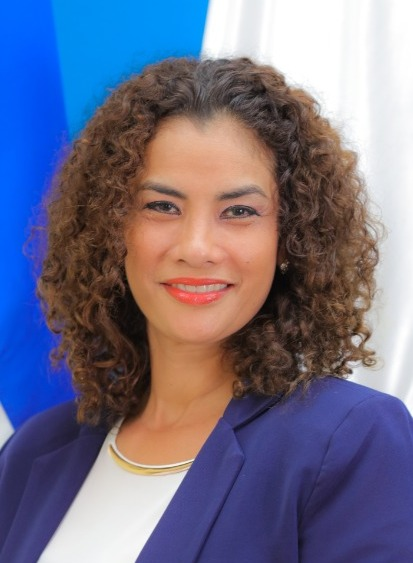

Mayor of Managua
- Incumbent
- Assumed office 4 January 2018
- Deputy: Enrique Armas
- Preceded by: Daisy Torres

Deputy Mayor of Managua
- In office 2009–2012
- Mayor: Daisy Torres

Personal details
- Born: Reyna Rueda Alvarado; 6 January 1970 (age 56)
- Party: FSLN
- Children: 2
- Education: Central American University

Reyna Rueda Alvarado (born 6 January 1970) is a Nicaraguan politician. A member of the Sandinista National Liberation Front (FSLN), she has served as mayor of Managua since 2018.

== Early life ==
Rueda studied business administration at the Central American University (UCA).

== Career ==
Rueda was serving as a member of the Managua city council as of 2017. She was elected mayor on 5 November of that year with 87.64% of the vote, and sworn into office on 4 January 2018, to serve a four-year term. She succeeded Daysi Torres.

On a 2019 visit to Miami, Rueda faced protests and calls for the United States government to revoke her visa, arguing she was complicit in alleged human rights violations by the FSLN government. Domestically, she faced criticism for her travel after billing the city of Managua 2.3 million córdobas (about $65,000 USD) for airplane tickets to 23 countries. As of 2017, the annual budget for the city was 5.19 million córdobas.

== Personal life ==
Rueda was married to Guillermo Nicolás Carmona Pineda, a lieutenant colonel in the Nicaraguan Army, until his death on 29 October 2020. They have two children.
