= MAAC =

MAAC may refer to:

- Metro Atlantic Athletic Conference, the former name for the NCAA Division-I affiliated athletic conference now known as Metro Conference
- Model Aeronautics Association of Canada
- Movimiento Auténtico Autónomo Costeño, a Nicaraguan political party
- Museo Antropologico y de Arte Contemporaneo, a museum in Guayaquil, Ecuador
