= Multiethnic Party for Coast Unity =

The Multiethnic Party for Coast Unity (Spanish: Partido Multiétnico por la Unidad Costeña - PAMUC) is a regional Nicaraguan political party founded in 2000. PAMUC has its base of supporters in the municipality of Waspam, in the North Atlantic Autonomous Region. The PAMUC contested in the 2002 Atlantic Coast Regional Elections and won 1 seat (out of 45) in the RAAN Regional Council. As of 2006, PAMUC is in alliance with the Nicaraguan Liberal Alliance in the 2006 Nicaraguan general election.
