= Alfredo Gómez Urcuyo =

Nicaraguan politician

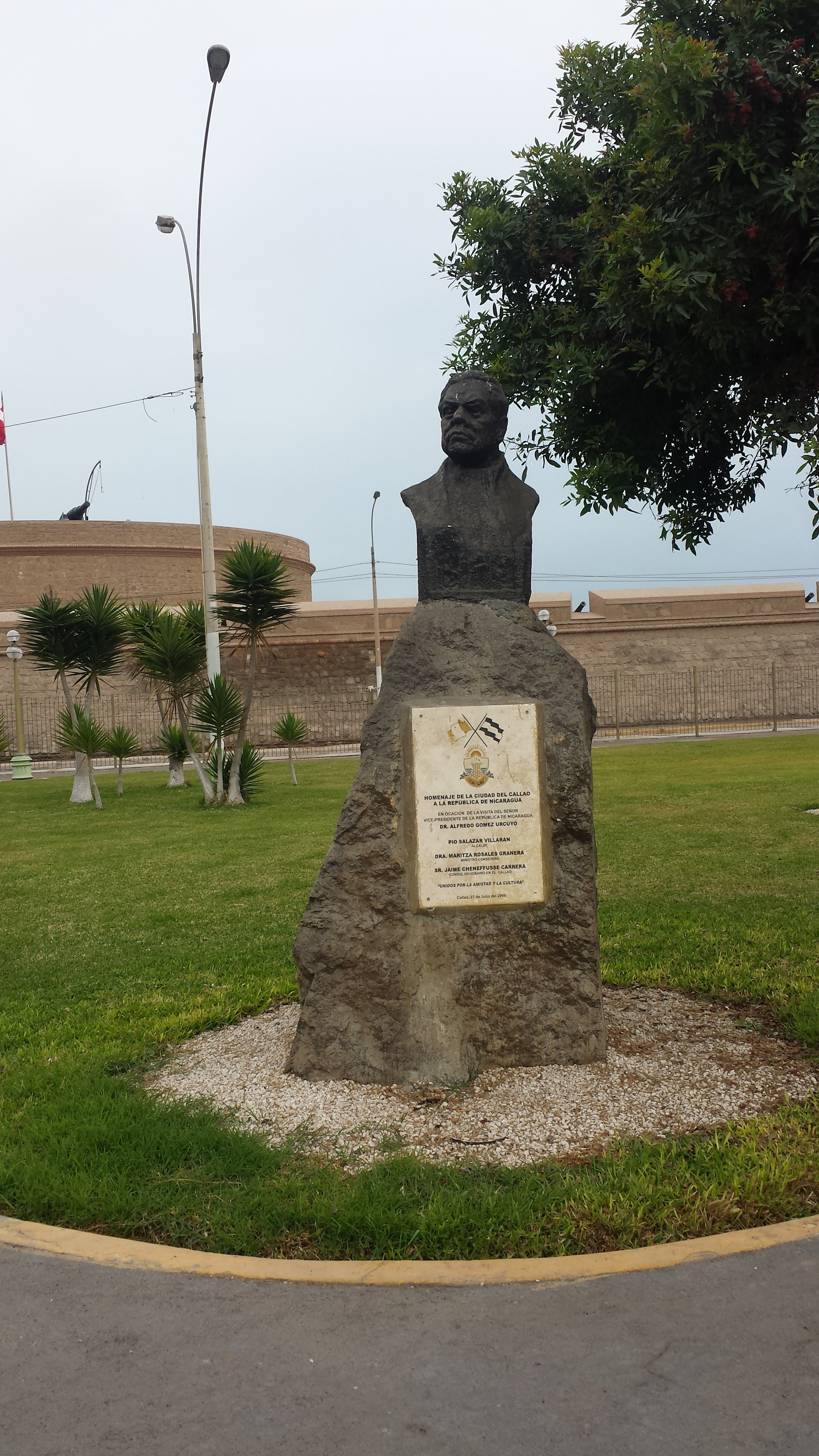
- Bust of Alfredo Gómez Urcuyo
- Born: August 19, 1942 (age 83); Rivas, Nicaragua
- Education: Central American University
- Occupations: veterinarian, politician
- Known for: Vice President of Nicaragua (2005–2007)

Alfredo Gómez Urcuyo (born August 19, 1942 in Rivas, Nicaragua), is a Nicaraguan Liberalist politician. Gómez was a substitute member of the National Assembly of Nicaragua from 1997 to 2005. On October 10, 2005, he was elected Vice President of Nicaragua upon the resignation of José Rizo to serve out the remainder of the term until 10 January 2007.

He is a veterinarian, graduated from the Central American University (UCA).

Political offices
Preceded by José Rizo	Vice President of Nicaragua; 2005–2007	Succeeded by Jaime Morales
