= Mayor of Managua =

Elected executive of capital of Nicaragua

- Seal of Managua

- Flag of Managua

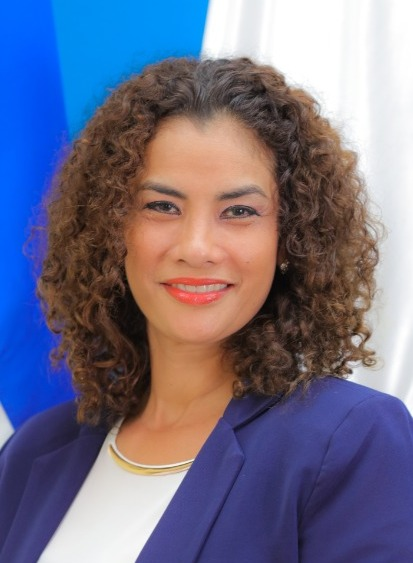
- Incumbent; Reyna Rueda since January 4, 2018
- Term length: Four years
- Inaugural holder: Juan Rovira
- Formation: 1818

The mayor of Managua is chief executive of the capital city of Nicaragua, with almost two million residents as of 2018. The mayor is chosen in the quadriennal Nicaraguan general elections. The incumbent is Reyna Rueda of the FSLN.

The city's other officials include the deputy mayor and the city council.

== List of mayors ==
- 1940-1941: Hernán Robleto Avilez
- 1941-1944: José Santos Zelaya Cousin
- 1944-1945: Carlos G. Zelaya Cousin
- 1945-1948: General Andrés Murillo Rivas
- 1948-1950: José Frixione Avilez
- 1950-1953: General Andres Murillo Rivas
- 1953-1954: Julio C. Quintana Villanueva
- 1954-1961: Gustavo Raskosky
- 1961-1963: Guillermo Lang
- 1963-1968: Humberto Ramírez Estrada
- 1968-1970: Arturo Cruz Porras (minister)
- 1970-1976 Luis Valle Olivares
- 1976-1979: Orlando Montenegro Medrano
- 1979-1980: Paul Atha Ramírez
- 1980-1986: Samuel Santos López – held office during the Junta of National Reconstruction; official title was "Minister of Reconstruction for Managua"
- 1986-1989: Moisés Hassan
- 1989-1990 : Carlos Carrión Cruz – previously in charge of FSLN political operations in Managua, Carrión became Mayor when Hassan quit the FSLN
- 1990-1995: Arnoldo Alemán – first mayor after FSLN defeat in 1990, elected with 52% of vote
- 1995-1996: Roberto Cedeño Borgen
- 1996-1997: Miriam Fonseca López
- 1997-2001: Roberto Cedeño Borgen
- 2001-2005: Herty Lewites
- 2005-2007: Dionisio Marenco
- 2009-2009: Alexis Argüello – died in office
- 2009-2018: Daysi Torres
- 2018–present: Reyna Rueda – elected on November 5, 2017 with 87.64% of the vote
