= Peruvian Ribereño Spanish =

Variety of the Spanish language spoken in Peru

Peruvian Coastal Spanish
- Ribereño Spanish; Español limeño
- Español costeño peruano
- Native to: Peru
- Region: Costa (including Lima, Trujillo, Chiclayo, and Piura)
- Ethnicity: Peruvians (predominantly coastal and urban)
- Language family: Indo-European: Italic; Romance; Western Romance; Ibero-Romance; West Iberian; Spanish; Peruvian Coastal Spanish
- Dialects: Limeño (Standard); Northern Coastal (Muchik influence); Southern Coastal; Inland Immigrant Sociolect (Andean influence)

Language codes
- ISO 639-3: –
- ISO 639-6: es-PE

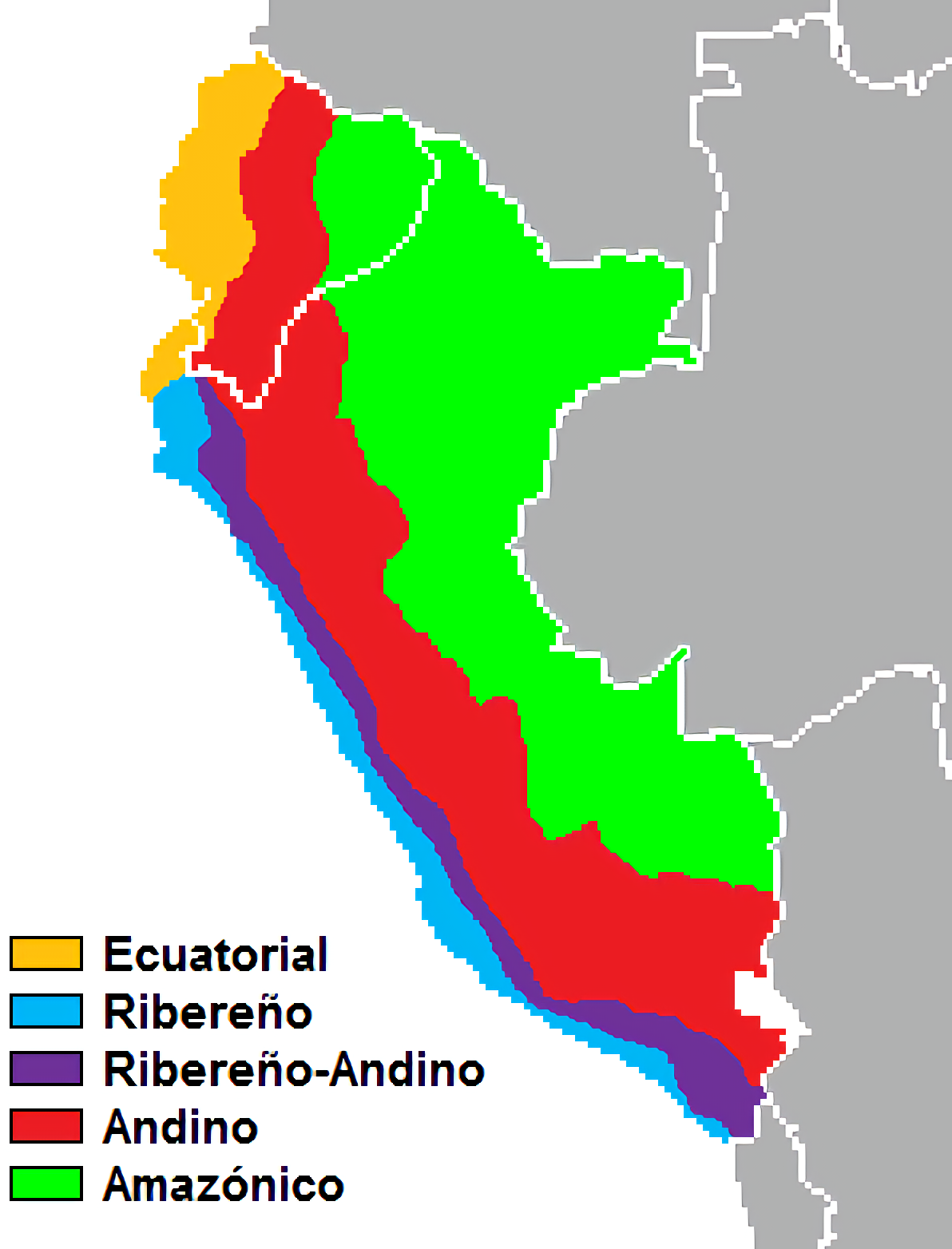
Dialectal map of Peru and Ecuador. The coastal dialect is highlighted in blue.

Peruvian coastal Spanish (Spanish: Español costeño peruano), also known as Ribereño Spanish (Spanish: Español ribereño) or Spanish from Lima (Spanish: Español limeño), is the form of the Spanish language spoken in the coastal region of Peru. The dialect has four characteristic forms today: the original one, that of the inhabitants of Lima (known as limeños) near the Pacific coast and partially to the south (formerly from the historic centre from where it spread to the entire coastal region); the inland immigrant sociolect (more influenced by Andean languages); the Northern form, in Trujillo, Chiclayo or Piura; and the Southern form. The majority of Peruvians speak this dialect, as it is the standard dialect of Spanish in Peru.

Between 1535 and 1739, Lima was the capital of the Spanish Empire in South America, from where Hispanic culture spread, and its speech became one the most prestigious in the region, as it was the home of the University of San Marcos. Also, it was the city that had the highest number of titles of nobility from Castile outside of Spain. Colonial people in Lima became used to living an ostentatious and courtly life style that people in the other capital cities of Spanish America did not experience, with the exception of Mexico City and later the city of Bogotá.

== Phonetics and phonology ==
Consonant phonemes of Peruvian Ribereño Spanish
	Labial		Dental/Alveolar		Palatal		Velar	
Nasal		m		n		ɲ		
Stop	p	b	t	d	tʃ	ʝ	k	ɡ
Continuant	f	b	s			ʝ	x	ɡ
Lateral				l				
Flap				ɾ				
Trill				r				

- In Lima there is no loss of syllable-final /s/ before a vowel or the end of a sentence. It is only aspirated in a preconsonantal position. This is unique, by all the social classes in the whole Latin American coast. The pronunciation of ese is soft predorsal.
- The vibrants /r/ and /ɾ/ are realized as non-assibilated [r] and [ɾ], respectively.
- Yeísmo and seseo occur.
- There is no confusion of /r/ with /l/ in syllable-final position like the Caribbean countries and the lower sociolects of Chile.
- /x/ before /e/ and /i/ are pronounced as a soft palatal [ç]. The jota is velar: [x] (resembling Castilian) in emphatic or grumpy speech, especially before /a/, /o/ and /u/; it is sometimes pronounced as glottal [h]
- If the word-final /d/ is not elided, it is hypercorrectively realized as a voiceless stop [t].
- Word-final /n/ is routinely retracted to velar [ŋ] (the most highlighted Andalusian trait).
- Additional marginal consonants [ʃ] and [ts] exist for Native American, Chinese and Japanese loanwords as well as proper nouns.

== Grammatical subject ==
Since the use of 'vos' instead of 'tú' as a familiar form of address was a marker of low social class in post-medieval Spanish, it exists throughout contemporary Latin America but it was never used in the capitals of the viceroyalties, such as Lima or Mexico City.

Prescriptive Limeño Spanish has adjusted considerably to more closely resemble the standard Spanish linguistic model, because of the city's disdain of the contact with the Andean world and autochthonous languages for centuries.

However, until the beginning of the 20th century, speech on the Northern Peruvian coast was similar in many ways with how individuals spoke on the Ecuadorian-Colombian coast. The most remarkable variation from the Castilian norm was the presence of 'vos', which was used to refer to one's family and is completely missing today. This part of Northern Peru also had a strong influence on the extinct Muchik or Mochica language.

== Inland immigrants variation ==
The other main variety of Spanish from the coast of Peru is that which appeared after the linguistic influence from the Andean Highlands and of the rural environment into the coastal cities and the former 'Garden City' by the Great Andean Migration (1940–1980).

Its main characteristics are:

- The strong use of diminutives, double possessives and the routine use of 'pues' or 'pe' and 'nomás' in postverbal position.
- The redundant use of verbal clitics, particularly 'lo' (the so-called loismo)
- The bilabialization of /f/
- Closed timbre
- Andean tone

== Recent changes ==
This popular variety of Coastal Peruvian dialect is the result of not only Andean but also foreign influences: Anglicisms, Argentinisms and Mexicanisms are all very present in the lexicon.

Pitucos, young people from Lima's higher socioeconomic strata, have also developed a peculiar and mannered form of speaking, noticeable particularly in the way that they alter their tone of speaking.

=== Some common expressions ===
- Agarrar y + to gather courage/motivation and take an action (Agarré y le dije...)
- Parar (en) = to frequently be somewhere or to frequently do something (Paras en la cabina)
- Pasar la voz = to inform (e.g. "spread the word")
- De repente = perhaps, suddenly (depending on context)
- Ni a palos = no way (literally "not even clubbed")

=== Some common words ===
- Anticucho = typical food consisting almost always of grilled chicken or cow heart.
- Disforzarse = to be anxious.
- Tombo = police officer or soldier.
- Calato = nude.
- Chicotazo = whiplash.
- Fresco/a (or conchudo/a) = shameless person.
- Fregar (or joder) = to bother, to ruin.
- Gallinazo = a turkey vulture or black vulture.
- Garúa = tenuous rain.
- Guachimán = adaptation of the English word watchman, meaning the same.
- Huachafo = ridiculous, gaudy (said of clothing).
- Huasca = to be drunk.
- Alucina = (literally "hallucinate") a word that more or less means: "can you believe it?".
- Jarana = a party with folk music.
- Juerga = a party.
- Óvalo = a roundabout.
- Panteón = a cemetery.
- Penar = said of a place, to have ghosts roaming around.
- Pericote = a mouse.
- Poto = ass, buttocks.
- Zamparse = to break into a place (as in a waiting line, or crashing a party), or to get drunk.

=== Some informal words of extended use ===
- Aguantar = to wait, to resist
- Causa = friend, pal
- Combi = small public transport van (ex. Toyota Hiace)
- Chibolo/a = child, adolescent (disrespectful if the person is older)
- Paltearse = to be embarrassed coming from the word for avocado (palta), to fear
- Pata = friend, pal
- Pendejo = cunning (interestingly, in others countries of Latin America it means the opposite)
- Pollada = party where cheap food and drink is served in order to raise money (poor, low-class phenomenon similar to a potluck)
- Yara/Yaraza = be careful

=== Contributions by other ethnic groups ===
Peruvians of foreign blood, especially of Chinese and Japanese descent, from first and second generations have a tinge of their native languages' rhythm and intonation to Lima accent, but most of the younger generations have no trace of their ancestry languages' accent, if they speak it in the first place.

=== Slang ===
Some Peruvian slang comes from inverting the syllables of a word. This can be seen in words like 'fercho', which comes from the word 'chofer', driver, the word 'tolaca', which comes from 'calato'. Slang words do not always have to be the exact inverse of the original word: for example 'mica' comes from the word 'camisa', which means shirt. Or 'jerma' which comes from 'mujer' meaning woman.

Peruvian slang originally developed in the 1970s and 1980s with the experience of military dictatorships and the ever-present threat of terrorist activities from Maoist groups such as the MRTA and Sendero Luminoso.

== Bibliographic sources ==
- Canfield, Delos Lincoln (1960), "Lima Castilian: The Pronunciation of Spanish in the City of the Kings", Romance Notes, 2: 1–4
- Canfield, Delos Lincoln (1981), Spanish pronunciation in the Americas, Chicago: University of Chicago Press
- Caravedo, Rocío (1977), Norma Culta de la ciudad de Lima, Lima: PUCP, Instituto Riva-Agüero, Cuadernos de Trabajo, 1
- Caravedo, Rocío (1983), Estudios sobre el español de Lima, I. Variación contextual de la sibilante, Lima: Fondo Editorial PUC
- Caravedo, Rocío (1990), Sociolingüística del español de Lima, Lima: Pontificia Universidad Católica del Perú
- Caravedo, Rocío (1993), El habla de Lima y los patrones normativos del español, Lima: Academia de Ciencias y Tecnología
- Escobar, Alberto (1978), Variaciones sociolingüísticas del castellano en el Perú, Lima: Instituto de Estudios Peruanos
- Granda, Germán de (2001), Estudios de linguistica andina, Lima: Pontificia Universidad Católica del Perú
- Lipski, John M. (1994), El español de América, Madrid: Cátedra
- Lope Blanch, Juan M. (1993), Ensayos sobre el español de América, México: Universidad Nacional Autónoma de México
- Mackenzie, Ian (2001), A Linguistic Introduction to Spanish, Newcastle upon Tyne: University of Newcastle upon Tyne, LINCOM Studies in Romance Linguistics 35
- Malmberg, Bertil (1970), La América hispanohablante: Unidad y diferenciación del castellano, Madrid: Istmo
- Rivarola, José Luis (1990), La Formación Lingüística de Hispanoamérica, Lima: Pontificia Universidad Católica del Perú
