= José Rizo Castellón =

Vice President of Nicaragua from 2002 to 2005

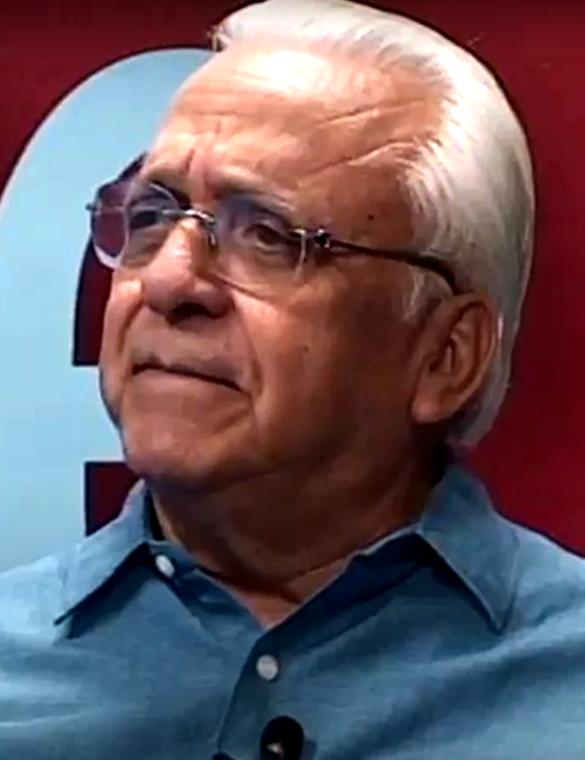
- José Rizo Castellón in 2015

Vice President of Nicaragua
- In office 10 January 2002 – 10 October 2005
- President: Enrique Bolaños
- Preceded by: Leopoldo Navarro
- Succeeded by: Alfredo Gómez Urcuyo

Personal details
- Born: José Rizo Castellón; 27 September 1944 Jinotega, Jinotega Department, Nicaragua
- Died: 23 April 2019 (aged 74) Valparaíso, Valparaíso Region, Chile
- Party: Constitutionalist Liberal Party
- Education: Central American University

José Rizo Castellón (27 September 1944 – 23 April 2019) was a Nicaraguan politician, affiliated with the Constitutional Liberal Party (PLC). Rizo was a lawyer trained at the Universidad Centroamericana of Managua in Nicaragua; he also studied in the London School of Economics.

== Biography ==
Rizo was nominated as the PLC's presidential candidate for the 2006 election in which he finished in third place behind Daniel Ortega and Eduardo Montealegre, receiving 25.11% of the vote. Rizo previously served as Vice President of Nicaragua under Enrique Bolaños, from 10 January 2002 until he resigned in 2005 to pursue the presidency in the November 2006 elections. José Antonio Alvarado was his vice-presidential running mate. He died of a terminal illness on 23 April 2019 in Santiago, Chile, at the age of 74.

Political offices
Preceded by Leopoldo Navarro	Vice President of Nicaragua; 2002–2005	Succeeded by Alfredo Gómez Urcuyo
