= Politics of Nicaragua =

Life in Nicaragua

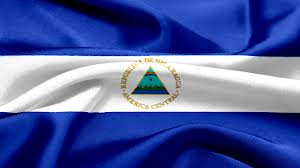

Cuisine
Culture
Demographics
Education
Holidays
Human Rights
Literature
Music
Politics
Religion
Tourism

Nicaragua operates nominally as a presidential republic in which the executive serves as both head of state and head of government, but since 2025 it has functioned as a formal co-presidency shared by Daniel Ortega and his wife Rosario Murillo, and as a de jure dictatorship since July 2026, when Ortega announced the country would no longer hold elections.

Executive power is exercised by the co-presidency, which, since the 2025 constitutional reforms, formally coordinates the legislative, judicial, and electoral branches, as well as the national police. Legislative power is nominally vested in both the government and the National Assembly, though the assembly operates under executive coordination and has unanimously approved successive reforms expanding presidential authority. The judiciary is likewise subordinated to the presidency under these reforms.

Nicaragua is consistently ranked as one of the least democratic countries in Latin America, with significant human rights violations. Since Ortega's return to presidential office in 2007, Nicaragua has experienced democratic backsliding, as Ortega has centralized power and repressed the political opposition. Scholars describe Nicaragua as somewhere between a competitive authoritarian regime and a full authoritarian regime. In July 2026, Ortega announced that elections would be abolished.

The dominant political party in Nicaragua, FSLN, is firmly controlled by Ortega. Despite his left-wing revolutionary rhetoric, Ortega has allied with the business class and allowed what Thaler and Mosinger characterize as crony capitalism to flourish.

== Constitution ==
In 1984, the electoral system was established in Nicaragua. The state completed its transition to an electoral democracy in 1990. In 1995, the executive and legislative branches negotiated a reform of the 1987 Sandinista constitution which gave extensive new powers and independence to the National Assembly, including permitting the Assembly to override a presidential veto with a simple majority vote and eliminating the president's ability to pocket veto a bill. Members of the unicameral National Assembly were elected to concurrent five-year terms. The constitution guarantees a comprehensive range of rights related to association and assembly. These rights were upheld for three terms after the transition to democracy in 1990, but in 2007, with Ortega's ascension to the Presidency, these rights were limited.

In January 2000, two opposing political leaders, Arnoldo Alemán of the Liberal Constitutionalist Party and Daniel Ortega of the Sandinista National Liberation Front, came together to formally establish "El Pacto", an amendment to the Nicaraguan constitution. This agreement filled seats within government with officials from each party in an attempt to champion political stabilization and make governmental institutions more streamlined. However, this restricted opposition parties' ability to enter politics and limited political participation. The amendment also granted the President immunity from prosecution unless there was a vote in the National Assembly that achieved over two-thirds of the vote to remove it. Additionally, it states that after an election, there are reserved seats for both the former President and Vice President in the National Assembly. Finally, this also changed the requirements to become President by reducing the vote percentage needed to avoid a run-off election to forty percent. It also allowed a candidate to win with thirty-five percent of the vote if they achieved at least five percent more than the runner-up.

In January 2014, the National Assembly approved changes to the constitution, removing presidential term limits. This allowed current President Daniel Ortega to run for a third successive term. The reform scraps the previous amendment that a candidate must achieve thirty-five percent of the vote. Additionally, it allows for the appointment of active duty policy and military officials to government offices that were previously held by civilians. By expanding Presidential powers, Ortega was no longer required to appear before the National Assembly to deliver reports, and this allowed him to issue executive orders with greater autonomy. Moreover, these reforms formalized the Councils of Citizen Power – a system of neighborhood committees that served as bodies of participatory democracy. However, because they are required to support presidential plans, the CPCs have become subject to partisan control mechanisms.

In February 2023, Article 21 of the National Assembly amended the constitution to allow the government to remove the citizenship of anyone categorized as a traitor. This resulted in political prisoners being exiled. In 2024, the National Assembly passed several amendments legalizing the practice of the government seizing the property and assets of political opponents. The National Assembly gave the regime access to remittances and the ability to seize any electronic transfers considered suspicious through the amendment of the Financial Analysis Unit Law in September 2024.

In 2025, Nicaragua's constitution underwent significant reforms that formally established the position of "co-president" for Rosario Murillo, elevated the Sandinista flag as a national symbol, and legitimized the "Volunteer Police" as an auxiliary body composed of institutionalized paramilitary groups.

== Executive branch ==
The president and the vice president are elected for a single five-year term. With the reform of the constitution in 2014 the ban on re-election of the president has been removed. The president appoints the Council of Ministers.

Daniel Ortega previously led Nicaragua through revolution and civil war, but was voted out in 1990. He was then elected as a left-wing leader in the 2006 elections. By returning to authoritarian methods, he has remained in power. In 2025, lawmakers approved a constitutional amendment elevating Ortega's wife, Vice President Rosario Murillo, to the position of co-president.

The 2014 constitutional reforms re-established a direct relationship between the executive, military, and the police that would bypass civilian ministers and allow them to occupy bureaucratic positions for "national security reasons." As a result, the military is now in charge of intelligence and security. Through a vast surveillance network controlled by Co-Presidents Ortega and Murillo, the Nicaraguan Telecommunications and Postal Institute (TELCOR) has actively collaborated with this state police apparatus to host "troll farms" that threatened Nicaraguans.

Religious influence on the Executive Branch

For centuries, both the Protestant and Catholic Churches played significant roles in Nicaraguan politics. According to the Association of Religion Data Archives, 91.5% of Nicaraguans identify as Christian. Of the Christian faith, 71.1% identify as Catholics and 24.8% identify as Protestants. President Daniel Ortega used the Catholic church to achieve political success many times throughout his career. The most glaring example of this was Ortega's success in the 2007 election. Ortega, throughout his campaign, "publicly begged forgiveness from... the Catholic Church for persecuting them in the 1980s." He repeatedly referenced his faith and God in his speeches as he publicly presented himself as a devout Catholic and a 'new man.' Ortega further gained the favor of the Catholic Church by abolishing a woman's right to therapeutic abortion. The Catholic Church supported Ortega because they believed that once in office, he would continue to maintain the church's influence in public policy. Ortega played similarly into the good graces of the biggest Protestant sect in Nicaragua, the Pentecostals, through apologizing for his party's persecution of the group during the 1980s and pushing policy that aligned with their socially conservative views.

Beginning in 2018, the Nicaraguan government initiated measures affecting influential religious groups, including the Catholic Church and the Pentecostals, following public criticism from their leaders regarding government actions. This was the first time in 15 years that Ortega targeted religious organizations. Ortega has since shut down Catholic television shows and radio channels and arrested top leaders. In March of 2022, Ortega expelled the Vatican's envoy to Nicaragua, followed by the expulsion of 18 nuns from the missionary order founded by Mother Theresa in July of 2022. A month following, Ortega arrested Bishop Alvarez, a senior clergyman, accusing him of having supported the 2018 government protests. Bishop Alvarez refused expulsion to the United States, and was consequently sentenced to over 26 years in prison and stripped of his nationality.

Moreover, other religious organizations, like NGOs, were shut down by the Ortega regime. NGOs of this kind were subject to thorough financial reporting requirements and were penalized through arrests, seizures of property, and even imprisonment.

== Legislative branch ==
The National Assembly (Asamblea Nacional) consists of 90 deputies elected from party lists drawn at the department and national level, plus the outgoing president and the runner-up in the presidential race, for a total of 92. Members are directly elected by a popular vote on a proportional representation basis from party lists. In the 2011 elections, the Sandinista National Liberation Front won 63 seats (securing a majority), the Independent Liberal Party won 27 seats, and the Constitutionalist Liberal Party won 2 seats. This includes seats given to outgoing Vice President Jaime Morales Carazo and presidential runner-up Fabio Gadea Mantilla.

In 2011, the outgoing Vice President Jaime Morales Carazo's seat would usually have gone to the outgoing president. However, after the Constitution was modified to remove term limits, Danial Ortega was re-elected. After the passage of the Law in Defense of the Rights of the People to Independence in 2020, the government arrested opposition candidates prior to the 2021 legislative elections. The Supreme Electoral Council (CSE) annulled the legal status of rival parties.

== Judicial branch ==
The Supreme Court of Justice supervises the functioning of the still largely ineffective and overburdened judicial system. As part of the 1995 constitutional reforms, the independence of the Supreme Court was strengthened by increasing the number of magistrates from 9 to 12. In 2000, the number of Supreme Court Justices was increased to 16. Supreme Court justices are nominated by the political parties and elected to 7-year terms by the National Assembly. Justices are also responsible for appointing judges to the lower courts.

However, Nicaragua currently does not have an independent judiciary because judges are nominated by the executive branch. In 2021, the judiciary ended the legal status of opposition parties and began ordering the arrests of opposition members in "sham trials" where defendants were convicted of undermining judicial integrity. In 2023, then Vice President Murillo dismissed at least 900 judges and officials. In July 2024, 50 new judges with no formal judicial training were appointed on partisan grounds. In January and May 2024, judicial independence was further weakened through the lowering of the Judicial budget when the National Assembly approved reforms to the Judicial Career Law and Organic Law of the Judiciary.

Additionally, Nicaragua has faced rampant due process violations since the 2018 protests. Police conduct politically motivated arrests, and authorities often act without warrants. Political prisoners face severe abuses, including psychological and physical torture, sexual violence, disappearances, extrajudicial killings, and forced confessions.

== Political parties and elections ==
=== Parties ===
The ruling party is the Sandinista National Liberation Front (FSLN), led by President Daniel Ortega.

In 2020, the National Assembly passed the Law in Defense of the Rights of the People to Independence. The Ortega administration uses this law to detain opposition candidates and prevent government critics from holding office. The Supreme Electoral Council (CSE) annulled the legal status of rival parties in 2021.

=== Elections ===
Previously, Nicaragua held elections to the presidency every five years. In 2014, changes to the constitution eliminated term limits. Consequently, Daniel Ortega has been the president since 2006.

The National Assembly consists of 92 seats. Members were chosen through proportional representation. Two of the seats go to the former president and the runner-up in the most recent election. Legislative elections used to take place every five years.

In July 2026, Ortega declared that the country would no longer hold elections, canceling the scheduled general election. The U.S. State Department condemned Ortega for permanently cancelling elections, calling his regime an "enemy of humanity" as he cements his authoritarian rule. The UN human rights chief condemned Nicaragua's decision to abolish elections.

== Electoral branch ==
Historically, led by a council of seven magistrates, the Supreme Electoral Council (CSE) is the co-equal branch of government responsible for organizing and conducting elections, plebiscites, and referendums. The magistrates and their alternates are elected to 5-year terms by the National Assembly. Constitutional changes in 2000 expanded the number of CSE magistrates from five to seven and gave the PLC and the FSLN a freer hand to name party activists to the council, prompting allegations that both parties were politicizing electoral institutions and processes and excluding smaller political parties.

On November 22, 2024, the National Assembly approved reforms, which went into effect on February 18, 2025. The constitutional reforms include the establishment of a co-presidency, an extension of presidential terms, and the centralization of state powers. State power is centralized under the presidency, which coordinates the electoral body. The presidency supervises the electoral office and appoints the president and vice president of the office for six-year terms.

== Human rights ==
In the constitution, Nicaragua provides in principle for the defense of human rights. However, in a state where the government is known for violent repression and it is illegal to even wave the national flag or sing the national anthem in public, there is little legitimacy in the constitution. Freedom of speech is a right guaranteed by the Nicaraguan constitution, but media has come under censorship from time to time. Other constitutional freedoms include peaceful assembly and association, freedom of religion, and freedom of movement within the country, as well as foreign travel, emigration, and repatriation. The government also permits domestic and international human rights monitors to operate freely in Nicaragua. The constitution prohibits discrimination based on birth, nationality, political belief, race, gender, language, religion, opinion, national origin, economic or social condition. Same-sex relationships have been legal since 2008. All public and private sector workers, except the military and the police, are entitled to form and join unions of their own choosing, and they exercise this right extensively. Nearly half of Nicaragua's work force, including agricultural workers, is unionized. Workers have the right to strike. Collective bargaining is becoming more common in the private sector.

Despite these protections, Nicaragua faces high levels of repression. Individuals deal with major obstacles to freedom of movement regarding their place of residence, education, and employment. Beginning in 2018, there was a mass repression of protestors that resulted in 355 deaths at the hands of paramilitaries. The Office of the United Nations High Commissioner for Human Rights (OHCHR) responded by publishing a report, directly blaming the Nicaraguan government for the repression and calling for decisive action. Ortega denied the UN's claims and refused to step down from the presidency. Instead, he expelled the UN human rights team from operating in Nicaragua. This was followed by a massive crackdown on political opponents in 2021. The ongoing surveillance and harassment of civilians by police and paramilitary groups result in an environment of fear, discouraging free movement, on top of the limitations already provided by poor infrastructure. Additionally, surveillance in Nicaragua extends into the digital realm through intercepting phone calls, hacking devices, and installing spyware to maintain control over the people. These operations are controlled by government institutions and the FSLN, answering directly to Co-Presidents Daniel Ortega and Rosario Murillo. The government's repression also extends beyond its borders, targeting exiled Nicaraguans abroad whom it considers "traitors to their homeland." This is carried out by refusing to renew passports, erasing birth certificates, confiscating property, and banning reentry.

While property rights are protected by the Constitution, the reality is much more complicated. The Ortega regime often seizes private assets of political opponents. Gender-based violence is a serious human rights concern, with 76 femicides reported in the first 11 months of 2024. Abortion is illegal and can result in 8 years of imprisonment. Nicaraguan women and children are at a high risk of experiencing sex trafficking.

There have also been reports of possible electoral manipulation techniques. The Ortega-Murillo family owns seven radio stations and three television channels in Nicaragua. In addition to control of the media, there have been documented cases of vote miscounting, record falsification, and ballot-box destruction in 2008. A reform in 2012, enacted by the National Assembly, facilitated the purging of electoral rolls by allowing CSE to continuously review and remove citizens who have not voted since 2006.

The Nicaraguan government has faced much backlash for its human rights violations by neighboring governments and international organizations. The UN Human Rights Experts Group has continued to denounce the government's actions, presenting a report in Geneva that claimed Ortega had engaged in "extrajudicial executions, arbitrary detentions, torture, and other cruel, inhuman, or degrading treatment" after the deaths of 40 demonstrators. When Ortega arrested Bishop Alvarez, a senior clergyman, accusing him of having supported the 2018 government protests, the Inter-American Commission on Human Rights (IACHR) and OHCHR jointly denounced the increase in human rights violations and called for Alvarez's release.

== Administrative divisions ==
Nicaragua is divided into 15 departments: Boaco, Carazo, Chinandega, Chontales, Estelí, Granada, Jinotega, León, Madriz, Managua, Masaya, Matagalpa, Nueva Segovia, Rivas, Río San Juan, as well as in two autonomous regions: North Caribbean Coast Autonomous Region and South Caribbean Coast Autonomous Region. These two autonomous regions were developed from the former Mosquito Coast, which functioned as a British protectorate and therefore formed very different forms of government. In February of 1894, former President Zelaya militarily incorporated the coast, forcing the region to operate within the centralized governance structure and disregarding local culture. Following the 1979 Sandinista Revolution, the country was undergoing major political and social reforms. This resulted in the Law of Autonomy for the Atlantic Coast of Nicaragua in 1987, which granted the two regions autonomy in an attempt to recognize the diverse culture and structure of the region.

== Foreign relations ==
Since taking office in 2016, the Ortega administration has adopted an increasingly isolationist foreign policy, distancing Nicaragua from Western countries, such as the U.S. and the E.U., in response to their criticisms. However, since his first presidency, Ortega has sought to establish diplomatic ties with historically leftist governments, including those of China, Russia, and Cuba. When leading the Sandinista Revolution, Cuba provided Ortega with weapons, training, and advisors to help fight the U.S.-backed Contra rebels. Similarly, the Soviet Union allied itself with Nicaragua as part of its mission to increase its influence in Latin America. These relationships have followed Ortega into his second administration. When first elected, Ortega claimed he would "reestablish full relations with Cuba: commercial, diplomatic, and political relations with the brotherly Cuban people." Russia has also continued to provide Nicaragua with monetary and military assistance, despite its ongoing war with Ukraine. Nicaragua reestablished relations with China after severing ties with Taiwan, with Ortega even bending the legal system to allow for Chinese-affiliated mining companies to operate on Nicaraguan land. However, these relationships have only led to heightened tensions with the U.S., excluding Nicaragua from the Summit of the Americas. Additionally, Ortega also withdrew Nicaragua from the Organization of American States in 2023, heightening regional tensions by refusing to allow the organization's interference with Nicaragua's national sovereignty.

Nicaragua has had a complicated relationship with other Latin American countries. In the past, Venezuela has provided Nicaragua with privileged access to the market, thereby boosting its exports. Ortega, however, has broken off diplomatic relations with countries such as Colombia as a result of the 2008 Andean diplomatic crisis, stating that this was done "in solidarity with the Ecuadorian people." Nicaragua's relationship with Costa Rica has been strained by territorial disputes over the San Juan River and the 2015 Cuban refugee crisis.

As of 2025, the Nicaraguan government has withdrawn from various United Nations agencies – the Food and Agriculture Organization (FAO), International Labour Organization (ILO), International Organization for Migration (IOM), United Nations Educational, Scientific and Cultural Organization (UNESCO), United Nations High Commissioner for Refugees (UNHCR), and the United Nations Human Rights Council (UNHRC) – claiming bias, interference, and the publishing of unfavorable information. In one case, Nicaragua withdrew from the UN Human Rights Council in protest of a 2025 report alleging that ongoing repression by Ortega and Murillo constituted human rights violations. Nicaragua also withdrew from UNESCO when the Director-General, Audrey Azoulay, awarded the Guillermo Cano World Press Freedom Prize to the Nicaraguan newspaper La Prensa, which has continued to report despite imprisonment and exile of its leaders in 2021. The Nicaraguan government justified its decision by claiming the award was a "diabolical expression of a traitorous anti-patriotic sentiment" for "promoting military and political interventions by the United States in Nicaragua."

Nicaragua has ongoing tensions with the United States. The presence of the U.S. Marines in Nicaragua in the 20th century created lasting animosity towards the United States. More recently, the United States was opposed to Ortega during the 2006 election due to his authoritarian tendencies. The United States unsuccessfully attempted to thwart Ortega's election. However, Ortega's willingness to cooperate with counter-narcotics programs and international financial institutions improved relations. Furthermore, Ortega participated in the U.S.-Central America Free Trade Agreement (CAFTA-DR), making Ortega a reliable partner in an unstable region. After the 2018 civil insurrection, the U.S. denounced government repression and worked with the Catholic Church to support internal dialogue within Nicaragua. Consequently, the U.S. has continuously reduced development assistance. The United States concluded that it was useless to attempt mediation without evidence that Ortega had decided to soften his position.

== Political pressure groups ==
Some political pressure groups are:

- National Workers Front or FNT is a Sandinista umbrella group of eight labor unions, including
  - Farm Workers Association or ATC
  - Health Workers Federation or FETSALUD
  - Heroes and Martyrs Confederation of Professional Associations or CONAPRO
  - National Association of Educators of Nicaragua or ANDEN
  - National Union of Employees or UNE
  - National Union of Farmers and Ranchers or UNAG
  - Sandinista Workers' Centre or CST
  - Union of Journalists of Nicaragua or UPN

The FNT was established on April 28th, 1990, to defend the advancements for workers that Sandinista unions made under the 1979–1990 revolutionary government. The FNT currently stands at 800,000 members, and its union holds 80% trade union membership. They focus on workplace issues as well as "social, environmental, economic, and political issues such as housing, health, and access to education and social security."

- Permanent Congress of Workers or CPT is an umbrella group of four non-Sandinista labor unions, including
  - Autonomous Nicaraguan Workers Central or CTN-A
  - Confederation of Labour Unification or CUS
  - Independent General Confederation of Labor or CGT-I
  - Labor Action and Unity Central or CAUS
- Nicaraguan Workers' Central or CTN is an independent labor union

The CTN formed after the 1979 Nicaraguan Revolution and is closely associated with the FSLN and the International Trade Union Confederation.

- Superior Council of Private Enterprise or COSEP is the largest business association in Nicaragua. As of March 2023, the Ortega government has shut it down by stripping it of its legal status, citing bureaucratic failings as part of an effort to remove all opponents of the Ortega regime. To further break the organization down, "COSEP's two most recent presidents were detained and convicted on treason charges in a trial many international observers decried as politically motivated retribution."

== See also ==
- 2013–2019 Nicaraguan protests
- Freedom of the press in Nicaragua
- President of the Council of State of Nicaragua
