= Coast Peoples' Party =

Minor regional Nicaraguan political party

The Coast People's Party (Spanish: Partido de los Pueblos Costeños - PPC) is a minor regional Nicaraguan political party founded in 1997. As part of the Coast Alliance the Coast Peoples' Party holds opposing views to the Constitutionalist Liberal Party, also known as PLC, Partido Liberal Constitucionalista which is a large party political party in Nicaragua.

The PPC ran in the 1998 Atlantic Coast Regional Elections, as a member of the Coast Alliance coalition who won 2 seats (out of 45) in the RAAS Regional Council. These elections are held every four years.

As an Atlantic coastal party in an autonomous region of Nicaragua the Coast Peoples' Party is protected under the 7th article in second chapter of the Constitution of Nicaragua This means that citizens living in autonomous regions of the Atlantic Coast have the freedom to live under their own forms of social organization that are similar to that of their ancestors. Under the Constitution of Nicaragua the government made an autonomous system for ethnic groups inhabiting the coastal region. The National Assembly (Nicaragua) approved a State of Autonomy which lets these ethnic groups easily exercise their rights as citizens such as voting, also allowing them to form their own political parties such as the Coast Peoples' Party.
