= Coast Alliance =

Nicaraguan political coalition

The Coast Alliance (Spanish: Alianza Costeña - AC) was a regional Nicaraguan political coalition of five parties founded in 1997 in opposition to the Constitutionalist Liberal Party and the Sandinista National Liberation Front. The members of the coalition were:

- Nicaraguan Democratic Movement (MDN)
- Independent Liberal Party (PLI)
- Nicaraguan Resistance Party (PRN)
- Conservative Party (PC)
- Coast People’s Party (PPC)

The AC contested the 1998 Atlantic Coast Regional Elections and won 2 seats (out of 45) in the RAAS Regional Council.
