= Leopoldo Navarro =

Former vice president of Nicaragua

Leopoldo Navarro Bermúdez

Vice President of Nicaragua
- In office October 22, 2000 – January 10, 2002
- President: Arnoldo Alemán
- Preceded by: Enrique Bolaños Geyer
- Succeeded by: José Rizo Castellón

Personal details
- Born: August 19, 1917 Managua, Nicaragua
- Died: October 25, 2014 (aged 97) Managua, Nicaragua
- Party: Constitutionalist Liberal Party

Leopoldo Navarro Bermúdez (October 22, 1917 – October 25, 2014) was the Vice President of Nicaragua, in the administration of president Arnoldo Alemán.

== Early life ==
Bermudez was born on 22 October 1917 to J.Gonzalez Duarte and Dolores Bermudez Duarte in Managua, Nicaragua. He pursued primary and secondary education in Costa Rica. He was a doctor and surgeon by profession. He served as head of pathology departments in hospitals of various regions of Nicaragua.

In 1968, he joined the Liberal constitutional movement. Then he joined the Constitutionalist Liberal Party in 1981.

== Career ==
He was elected as a deputy of the National Assembly of Nicaragua from PLC, and served from 1997 to 2001. In 2000, he was unanimously elected as a vice president of the National Assembly. In 2000, he was unanimously elected as the Vice President of Nicaragua and served until January 2002.

== Later life ==
He pursued legislative career in PARLACEN. He successfully sought for national assembly after retiring from PARLACEN and was a deputy from 2007 to 2012.

== Death ==
He died on 25 October 2014, in Managua, Nicaragua.
