= Peruvian pollada =

Traditional food from Peru

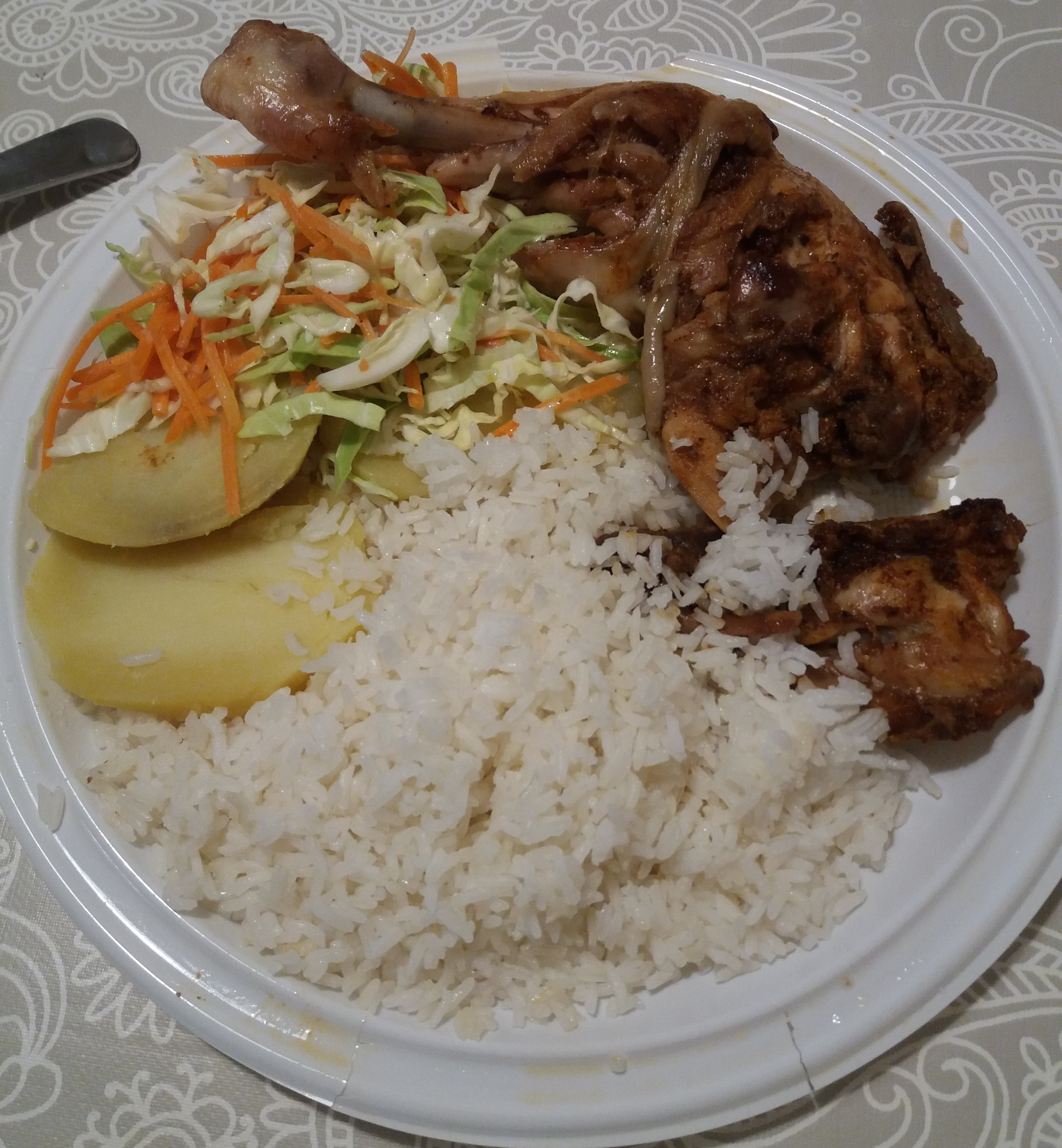
- Homemade pollada
- Associated cuisine: Peru
- Cooking time
- Main ingredients: chicken
- Ingredients generally used: chiles, spices
- Similar dishes: parrillada

Pollada is a Peruvian chicken dish. It is one of the most popular dishes in traditional Peruvian cuisine. It is a special dish because it is often prepared for fundraising events to help a particular need, such for charity or to pay for medical bills.

== History ==
Pollada is a dish that goes back many years and has been prepared for fundraisers for generations. It is believed that pollada was first prepared during Peru's periods of economic inflation, which forced Peruvians to live with overpriced food.

As inflation decreased quality of life, many Peruvians opted for this unique form of helping each other or themselves by selling pollada to meet their basic needs. Pollada events (or "chicken parties") are typically held with music and dancing, and the dish is bought with special pollada tickets.

In addition to its use in fundraising events, pollada is often prepared as an everyday household recipe.

== Preparation ==
The preparation consists of marinating the chicken with chiles and spices, which is the key for achieving the desired flavor.
