= Herty Lewites =

Nicaraguan politician (1939–2006)

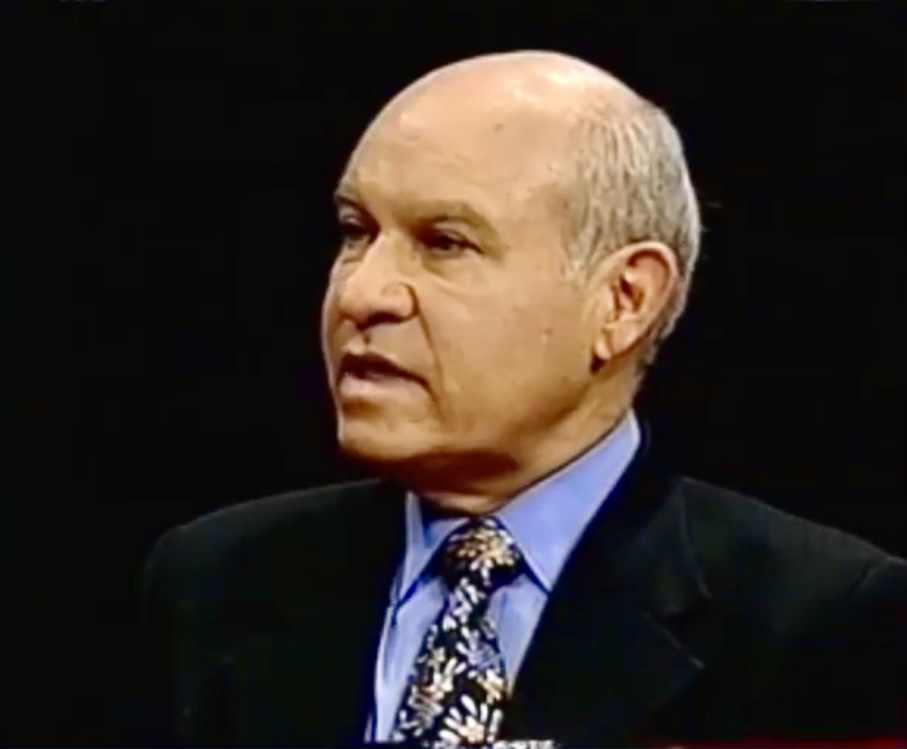
- Lewites in 2005

Mayor of Managua
- In office 2001–2005
- Preceded by: Roberto Cedeño Borgen
- Succeeded by: Dionisio Marenco

Personal details
- Born: 24 December 1939 Jinotepe, Nicaragua
- Died: July 2, 2006 (aged 66) Managua, Nicaragua

Herty Lewites Rodríguez (December 24, 1939 – July 2, 2006) was a Nicaraguan politician. He was Mayor of Managua and a candidate for president in the 2006 Nicaraguan general election when he died suddenly.

== Early life and involvement in the Nicaraguan Revolution ==
Lewites was born on December 24, 1939 in the San Felipe barrio of Jinotepe, the son of a Jewish immigrant from Poland (a candymaker) and a Catholic Nicaraguan. The two had met when his father visited Nicaragua from New York, fell in love with his mother and settled there. In Nicaragua his father owned the only gas station in town, Texaco, and two friends Lewites met at the gas station became pivotal in forming his commitment to fight the Somoza dictatorship: during the April 1954 rebellion, Lewites, then 15, was shocked by the murders of his friends Pablo Leal and Adolfo Báez Bone by the Somoza National Guard. He joined the struggle against the Somoza dictatorship in 1958 and went into exile in Brazil in 1960 with his father following Lewites’ participation in the military action taking of the Jinotepe and Diriamba headquarters. Later Lewites went to El Salvador, Mexico and Cuba, and in 1969 he joined the Sandinista National Liberation Front. Rather than fighting, he began directing Solidarity Committees, becoming involved in financial matters and arms smuggling for the revolutionary movement. In 1973 he was imprisoned in the United States for illicit arms trafficking, spending a year and a half in a federal penitentiary at San Pedro, California. Outside of prison, he was highly effective and creative in his efforts, staging photography sessions to mislead the Somocistas about the whereabouts of key Sandinista fighters like Nora Astorga. He also helped form the Group of 12, a group of major Nicaraguan establishment figures who agreed to show public support for the Sandinistas, lending legitimacy to the FSLN.

His brother, Israel Lewites, was involved in armed struggle and died in the attack on the Masaya barracks in October 1977.

== Years in government ==
During the period of Sandinista rule in the 1980s, Lewites was an ally of the powerful Ortega brothers. As Minister of Tourism, he promoted state development projects, such as the Montelimar beach resort in 1986 and the Olof Palme Convention Center in Managua.

Lewites was twice married, first to Edda María Lacayo, with whom he had a son and later to Carmen García, who was his secretary at the Ministry of Tourism. He left his first wife and had a daughter with García.

After leaving government, he built the "Hertylandia" private amusement park.

Lewites was elected to Congress on the FSLN ticket in 1990, the year Daniel Ortega lost the presidency. He aligned himself with Sergio Ramírez's Sandinista Renewal Movement (Movimiento Renovador Sandinista or "MRS") against the faction of Secretary General Ortega in 1994. He ran for mayor of Managua, the capital, in 1996 on his own "Sol" ticket, splitting the Sandinista vote to throw the election to the Liberal candidate. With the support of the FSLN "Business Bloc" led by Bayardo Arce, Lewites rejoined the mainline FSLN in 1998 and, with Ortega's blessing, won the Managua mayorship as a Sandinista in 2000.

Lewites opened Nicaragua's only amusement park, Hertylandia (named after himself), between Jinotepe and San Marcos.

Following Ortega's third successive election defeat in 2001, Lewites advocated FSLN cooperation with President Enrique Bolaños in his struggle to hold ex-President Arnoldo Alemán accountable for corruption. Ortega, however, eventually concluded a pact with Alemán. Meanwhile, Lewites removed corrupt members of the Ortega and Arce factions from positions in the Managua municipality. By appealing to both leftists and rightists fed-up with corruption, Lewites was for a while the most popular politician in Nicaragua and attracted the support of many historically prominent Sandinistas. He attempted to challenge Daniel Ortega for the 2006 FSLN presidential nomination, but was expelled from the FSLN (Sandinista Party) in February 2005.

Lewites joined forces with the dissident MRS Party as their Presidential candidate for the 2006 election. He chose Edmundo Jarquín as his running mate for the vice presidency.

== Death ==
On July 2, 2006, it was reported that Lewites died of a massive heart attack at the Hospital Metropolitano "Vivian Pellas" in Managua, aged 66, four months prior to the 2006 national elections. Some of Lewites supporters suspected he was poisoned by Ortega. His wife did not ask the doctor for autopsy to identify the cause of his death and later remained silent to the press. Lewites was polling in third place before dying, trailing very closely behind Ortega and Eduardo Montealegre. His death sealed Ortega’s victory, as his 1998 pact with Arnoldo Alemán changed the election rules to require a candidate only exceed 35% of the vote to win without a runoff.

Lewites was buried in his native city of Jinotepe three days after he died. His burial counted with the presence of: the president of the republic, cabinet members, diplomatic representatives, artists, politicians and entrepreneurs. It is calculated that more than 20,000 people were in attendance in the small cemetery of Jinotepe. His rectangular tomb depicts a Star of David with a Christian cross in the center and an epitaph, inscribed on marble, repeats a sentiment he was known for: "I was born under one dictatorship and I don't want to die under another."
