= Moises Omar Halleslevens Acevedo =

Former Vice President of Nicaragua

Omar Halleslevens
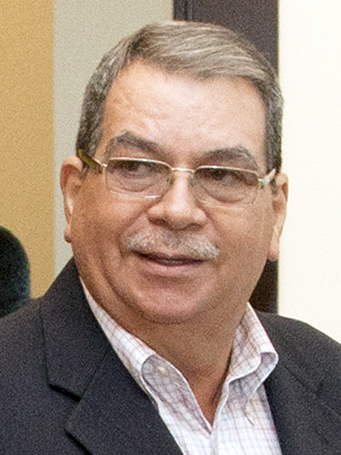

Vice President of Nicaragua
- In office 10 January 2012 – 10 January 2017
- President: Daniel Ortega
- Preceded by: Jaime Morales Carazo
- Succeeded by: Rosario Murillo

Personal details
- Born: 3 September 1949 (age 75); La Libertad, Chontales, Nicaragua
- Political party: FSLN
- Spouse: Ligia Alemán

Moisés Omar Halleslevens Acevedo (born 3 September, 1949) is the former Vice President of Nicaragua, serving during the third term of President Daniel Ortega.

== Biography ==
Halleslevens was born in La Libertad, Chontales. In 1974, he joined the "Juan José Quezada" guerrilla column, which attacked the house of the Minister of Agriculture, under the regime of Anastasio Somoza Debayle and negotiated for the freedom of various political prisoners, including Ortega. During the 1980s, Halleslevens was chief of the Army Political Directorate and, later, Military Counterintelligence. In the aftermath of Hurricane Joan in 1988, he led the evacuation of El Rama.

Halleslevens served as Commander in Chief of the Nicaraguan Armed Forces from 2005, until his retirement from the military life in 2010. In 2011, the Sandinista National Liberation Front nominated Halleslevens as Ortega's running mate. Ortega was reelected that year, and Halleslevens took office, replacing Jaime Morales Carazo.

His paternal origins are originally from Bavaria, Germany (Halleslevens) and his maternal origins are from Faro, Algarve, Portugal (Acevedo).

Political offices
| Preceded by Jaime Morales Carazo | Vice President of Nicaragua; 2012–2017 | Succeeded by Rosario Murillo |
