= Edmundo Jarquín =

Nicaraguan diplomat

- Born: Edmundo Jarquín; 19 September 1946 (age 79); Ocotal, Nicaragua
- Occupation: Politician
- Political party: Sandinista Renovation Movement

Edmundo Jarquín (born on 19 September 1946) is a Nicaraguan politician. He was the vice presidential running-mate of Herty Lewites, who was the presidential candidate for the Sandinista Renovation Movement (MRS) in the 2006 elections until his death on 2 July 2006. Jarquín then became the presidential candidate for the MRS. He chose Carlos Mejía Godoy to be his running mate. Jarquin finished in fourth place during the 2006 elections, receiving 6.29% of the vote.

== Early life ==
Edmundo Jarquín was educated in Nicaragua (Universidad Centroamericana - UCA), as well as in Chile (Universidad de Chile), where he obtained a law degree.

== Career ==
During the previous Sandinista regime, he served as ambassador of Nicaragua to Spain and to Mexico. After the Sandinista defeat in the elections of 1990, he became a member of the National Assembly for the FSLN. In 1992, he joined the Inter-American Development Bank (IDB) in Washington, D.C. until his retirement in 2005.

== Personal life ==
In 1986, he married Claudia Lucía Chamorro, also an FSLN ambassador and the daughter of eventual president Violeta Barrios de Chamorro. They moved to the United States in 1991 to seek treatment for Chamorro's son who had leukemia.
