= Civic Association of Potosí =

Nicaraguan political organization

The Civic Association of Potosí (Spanish: Asociación Cívica de Potosí - ACP) is a Nicaraguan political organization founded in 1996 in Potosí, Rivas, under the figure of a popular subscription association. The ACP won the municipal elections in Potosí in 1996 with about 38% of the valid votes.
