= Rigoberto Cruz =

Nicaraguan revolutionary

- Born: Rigoberto Cruz Arguello; January 6, 1941
- Died: August 27, 1967 (aged 26)
- Other name: Pablo Ubeda
- Occupation: Nicaraguan revolutionary

Rigoberto Cruz (died August 1967) was a Nicaraguan revolutionary who was one of the founders of the Sandinista National Liberation Front in 1961. Cruz, who is better known by his pseudonym Pablo Ubeda, is one of the early martyrs of the Sandinista revolution. He was killed in San Carlos after the battle of Pancasán in August 1967 in one of FSLN's historical defeats.

== Rigoberto Cruz in popular culture ==
Rigoberto Cruz is best known by his alias "Pablo Ubeda". He was also nicknamed "El cadejo de Las Segovias" as he was considered a master of disguise. During the insurrection, the North-Eastern Front was named "Frente Nor-Oriental Pablo Ubeda". After the Sandinista triumph in 1979, the special troops of the Ministry of Interior were also named after "Pablo Ubeda".
