= Confederación General del Trabajo (independiente) =

National trade union centre in Nicaragua

Confederación General del Trabajo (independiente) (Spanish for 'General Confederation of Labour (independent)') is a national trade union centre in Nicaragua. CGTi was founded in 1963, as the trade union wing of the Nicaraguan Socialist Party. CGTi was a member of the World Federation of Trade Unions.

CGTi joined UDEL. When the National Reconstruction Government was formed on July 19, 1979, CGTi had one of 33 representatives in the Council of State.

As of 1983, CGTi had 17177 members belonging to 19 affiliated unions. It was mainly active in construction, manufacturing, transport, communications, agriculture, fishing, electricity and gas sectors. As of 2006, CGTi was a part of the anti-Sandinista Permanent Workers' Congress.
