= Daysi Torres =

Nicaraguan politician and mayor of Managua

Daysi Ivette Torres Bosques is a Nicaraguan politician. She was mayor of Managua, the first female mayor of the city. She occupied the post from 2009 when the former mayor Alexis Argüello died until 2018. She is a member of the Sandinista National Liberation Front.
