= Alternative for Change =

Alternative for Change Alternativa por el Cambio
- Abbreviation: AC
- Founder: Orlando Tardencilla
- Founded: 2006
- Split from: Nicaraguan Party of the Christian Path
- Ideology: Christian democracy
- Political position: Centre-right
- Religion: Protestantism
- National affiliation: United Alliance Nicaragua Triumphs
- National Assembly: 0 / 92

Alternative for Change (Spanish: Alternativa por el Cambio - AC), formerly known as "Christian Alternative," is a Nicaraguan political party.

It was founded by dissidents from the Nicaraguan Party of the Christian Path (CCN), most notably Orlando Tardencilla. In the 2006 presidential elections, the party fielded Edén Pastora as its presidential candidate, but Pastora only managed to obtain 0.27% of the vote.
