= Edén Pastora =

Nicaraguan politician (1937–2020)

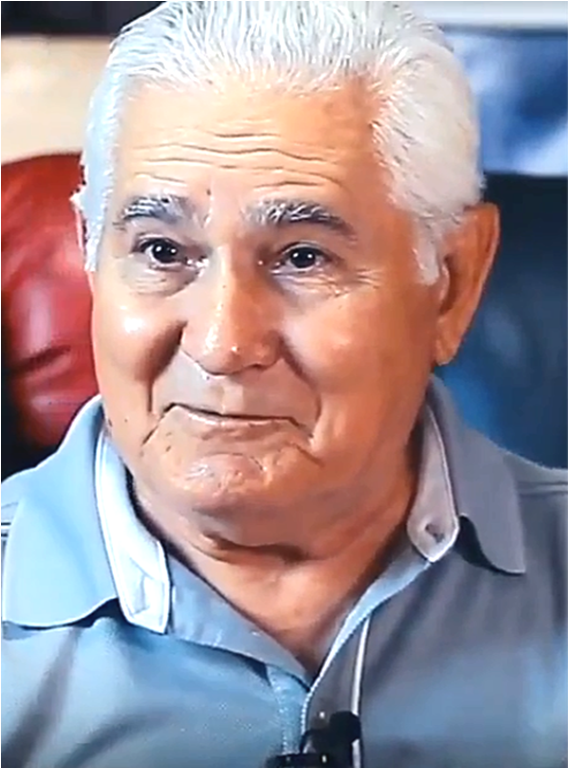
- Pastora in 2020

Personal details
- Born: January 22, 1937 Ciudad Darío, Matagalpa
- Died: June 16, 2020 (aged 83) Managua
- Party: Alternative for Change
- Occupation: Politician, Revolutionary

Edén Atanacio Pastora Gómez (November 15, 1936 or January 22, 1937 – June 16, 2020) was a Nicaraguan politician and guerrilla who ran for president as the candidate of the Alternative for Change (AC) party in the 2006 general elections. In the years prior to the fall of the Somoza regime, Pastora was the leader of the Southern Front, the largest militia in southern Nicaragua, second only to the FSLN (Sandinista National Liberation Front) in the north. Pastora was nicknamed Comandante Cero ("Commander Zero").

His group was the first to call itself "Sandinistas", and was also the first to accept an alliance with the FSLN, the group that was to become more popularly identified by the name. At the end of 1982, a few years after the revolutionary victory, Pastora became disillusioned with the government of the FSLN, and formed the Democratic Revolutionary Alliance (ARDE) with the object of confronting the "pseudo-Sandinistas" politically and militarily.

As of 2010, he was reconciled with the FSLN and held a ministerial post in the government of Daniel Ortega. His role in a border dispute with Costa Rica and allegations of environmental damage to territory claimed by that country led to legal indictment by the government of Costa Rica.

== Sandinista ==
Edén Pastora on August 25, 1978, boarding a Venezuelan C-130 with 19 operatives, five hostages and 80 released political prisoners

Pastora was born in Ciudad Darío. When he was seven, Pastora's father was killed in a boundary dispute. While in high school with the Jesuits in Granada, he first learned about Augusto César Sandino through his Panamanian history teacher. He began his rebel career when he decided that the government of Anastasio Somoza Debayle was corrupt and formed the southern Nicaraguan ARDE from local peasant farmers (called campesinos) and aboriginal tribes living according to more traditional ways.

On December 27, 1974, an FSLN commando unit, headed by Pastora, burst into the house of Josè Maria Castillo, president of the Banco Central, and took his guests hostage (including two relatives of the dictator Somoza). Three days later, thanks to the Managua archbishop's intermediation, the hostages were released, in exchange for a million dollars and the freedom of some political prisoners. Castillo was the only victim of the action.

Pastora allied himself with the FSLN in the mid-1960s. He became a rebel guerrilla and was the mastermind behind the August 1978 standoff in the Nicaraguan National Palace, in which he and 19 FSLN commandos disguised as members of Somoza's National Guard stormed the Palace, disarming or killing the real Nicaraguan National Guard members. Among the hostages taken were the president of the Chamber of Deputies and a cousin of Somoza, Luis Pallais Debayle, and other members of the Nicaraguan Congress, which was in session at the time of the attack, and Somoza's half brother, José Somoza. Members of the commando used numbers as codenames, with Pastora as Zero, and Dora María Téllez as Commander "two" leading to a lasting identification of Eden as Comandante Cero and Dora Maria as Commander "two."

The operation infuriated Somoza and was considered one of the turning points in the insurgency. Originally organized to free FSLN members imprisoned by the regime — among the prisoners being Daniel Ortega and Tomás Borge — the raid marked an uncontested victory for the FSLN. After negotiating a USD$500,000 deal with Somoza and Cardinal Miguel Obando, Pastora, Ortega and other released prisoners left for Cuba, where he claimed to have been a "prisoner" lavished with women and luxury, but not allowed to leave the country until Martín Torrijos, the son of then Panamanian strongman Omar Torrijos and Pastora's personal friend, voiced his concern and went to Cuba to rescue him personally.

Pastora was put in command of the FSLN's Southern Front, advancing on the town of Rivas from bases in Costa Rica. In reaction to Pastora's widely held reputation, Somoza sent his best troops against him and as a consequence the Southern Front made little headway while suffering heavy casualties. However, the Southern Front contributed to the Sandinista victory by tying down over 2,000 heavily equipped Nicaraguan National Guard forces, as Somoza remained fixated on stopping Pastora, even as major cities fell to the rebels.

== Contra ==
Pastora became disenchanted with the turn of the revolution. In interviews conducted by Christopher Dickey in April 1982 and July 1984, he expressed concern about the killing of Jorge Salazar and the imprisonment of Bernadino Larios, a National Guard leader sympathetic to the Sandinistas. He also felt he had not received enough recognition for his efforts and was critical of Cuban involvement in the army and police. In addition, he thought that the government was nationalizing businesses without good reason. In a 1982 press conference, he argued that the Directorate had strayed too far from the democratic ideals it espoused during its struggle against the Somoza dictatorship and needed to pursue a more moderate path. He also felt that the members of the Directorate had lapsed into decadence, lambasting them for owning luxury cars and residences. He told reporters he hoped to sway the Directorate through force of persuasion; after being pressed about what he would do if the Directorate ignored him, he stated he would "take them out at gunpoint from their mansions and their Mercedes-Benzes."

Pastora turned against the Sandinista regime. He once again began military operations in southern Nicaragua, loosely federated with northern forces which, composed mostly of highly paid former National Guard members and some Miskito Indians, were collectively referred to as the Contras. From a military standpoint, Pastora's efforts contributed much less than did forces in the north.

Pastora also received less support from the US government; whether his performance was a result or cause of this disparity is subject to debate. Military achievements aside, the presence of Pastora, a former FSLN revolutionary hero, among the Contras, helped the public image of the Contras abroad and provided a sort of public-relations counterweight to the bad reputation accorded to the FDN faction (mostly led by ex-National-Guard "Somocistas"). However, Pastora soon lost whatever popularity he might have had among common Nicaraguans as he adopted the strategy of the northern Contras, committing human rights abuses while mostly avoiding direct encounters with the Nicaraguan military.

In 1984, Pastora was apparently the intended target of the La Penca bombing, which killed four people at a press conference he was holding. He was seriously wounded and had to receive skin grafts on his shins and thighs. Bits of wire and other bomb fragments were still lodged in his skin months later. Once, after his wife warned him that plucking out the fragments would only result in infection, he quipped that he was "the bionic man. I don't get infections. See, they've repaired these short circuits."

Pastora became disillusioned with Nicaragua and became a refugee in Costa Rica during the 1990s, where he became a citizen. Later, however, he returned to Nicaragua.

== Later years ==
Pastora since opened a shark fishing business in San Juan del Norte on the San Juan River along the border with Costa Rica.

He was seen at a Sandinista demonstration over the slow certification of winners in the November 5, 2000 municipal elections.

Álvaro Pardo made a documentary about Pastora in 2006 called Edén Pastora - Comandante Cero. It portrays Pastora's return to the political arena of Nicaragua when he was nominated as a candidate for the mayor of Managua.

Pastora ran for president in the general election of 2006. He finished in fifth place, with 0.29% of the vote. In 2008, Pastora announced that he had become reconciled with the current FSLN and pledged support for the government of Daniel Ortega. He is quoted as saying, "this government is making a revolution, one-eyed or lame, but it is a revolution." As of 2010, he held the title of Minister of Development of the Rio San Juan Basin.

In November 2010, in perhaps the most publicized Costa Rican arrest warrant issued in years, prosecutors in northern Caribbean canton of Pococí announced that Pastora, now 73 years old, had been indicted for severe environmental damage caused in the eastern Limón Province near the Río San Juan that the Republic of Nicaragua claims to be a part of their territory. In a taunt taken at face value by many in the international media, Pastora (and the Nicaraguan Government) based his arguments not on official maps but on faulty border information obtained from Google Maps. Pastora and his soldiers invaded the Caleros Island in order to create a channel connecting the San Juan River with the Atlantic Ocean. The government of Costa Rica, which disputes ownership of the island with Nicaragua, holds that this has caused irreparable ecological destruction.

In April 2015 photos show the now 78-year-old Pastora watching as the canal that provoked the international incident was filled with sand. He is well above the ground watching from a ladder lashed to trees.

== Personal life and death ==
Pastora had three failed marriages. Lamenting about the interpersonal strains that occur in the life of a revolutionary, Pastora said: "The first thing we revolutionaries lose is our wives. The last thing we lose is our lives. In between our women and our lives, we lose our freedom, our happiness, our means of living."

Pastora died at a military hospital in Managua on June 16, 2020, at the age of 83. The cause of death was reported variously as either respiratory failure or a heart attack. While hospitalized, Pastora was also treated for symptoms of COVID-19, although his grandson said he was not tested for the coronavirus.

== See also ==
- CIA and Contras cocaine trafficking in the US
