= Authentic Costeño Autonomy Movement =

Regional Nicaraguan political party

The Authentic Costeño Autonomy Movement (Spanish: Movimiento Auténtico Autónomo Costeño - MAAC) is a regional Nicaraguan political party founded in 1993 by Faran Dometz Hebbert, a Moravian pastor from Pearl Lagoon and former director of the Moravian High School in Bluefields. MAAC represents the Creole establishment. The MAAC contested the 1994 Atlantic Coast Regional Elections and won 2 seats (out of 45) in the RAAS Regional Council.
