= Central de Acción y Unificación Sindical =

Nicaraguan trade union confederation

The Central de Acción y Unificación Sindical (Spanish for "Centre for Trade Union Action and Unification") is a national trade union centre in Nicaragua. CAUS was founded in 1973, as the trade union wing of the Communist Party of Nicaragua.

As of 1983, CAUS had 1939 members belonging to 15 affiliated unions. It mainly worked in manufacturing, agricultural and fishing sectors.
