= Costeño Democratic Alliance =

Nicaraguan political party

The Costeño Democratic Alliance (Spanish: Alianza Democrática Costeña - ADECO) is a regional Nicaraguan political party founded in 1993 by the Social Christian dissident Alvin Guthrie, former UNO governor of the South Atlantic Autonomous Region from 1990 to 1994. ADECO contested in the 1994 Atlantic Coast Regional Elections and won 1 seat (out of 45) in the RAAS Regional Council.
