= Communist Party of Nicaragua =

Political party in Nicaragua

Communist Party of Nicaragua Partido Comunista de Nicaragua
- Founded: 12 October 1967 (as the Socialist Workers' Party)
- Split from: Nicaraguan Socialist Party
- Ideology: Communism; Marxism-Leninism
- Political position: Far-left

1984 PCdeN election poster

The Communist Party of Nicaragua (Spanish: Partido Comunista de Nicaragua, abbr. PCdeN or PCN) is a Marxist-Leninist party in Nicaragua. Founded as the Socialist Workers' Party (Partido Obrero Socialista) in 1967, the core founding members were Juan Lorio, Augusto Lorío, Elí Altamirano (who later served as the party's secretary general) and Manuel Pérez Estrada, who all had been expelled from the Nicaraguan Socialist Party on 23 April 1967.

The party adopted its current name on 13 December 1970.

The PCdeN was a member of the U.S.-funded National Opposition Union (UNO), a coalition of mostly right-leaning political parties which defeated the Sandinista government in the 1990 general election.

For the 1996 Nicaraguan general election, the party nominated secretary general Elí Altamirano as its presidential candidate, who obtained 0.27% of the votes.

== See also ==
- Central de Acción y Unificación Sindical
