= Jaime Morales Carazo =

Nicaraguan politician

Jaime Rene Morales Carazo
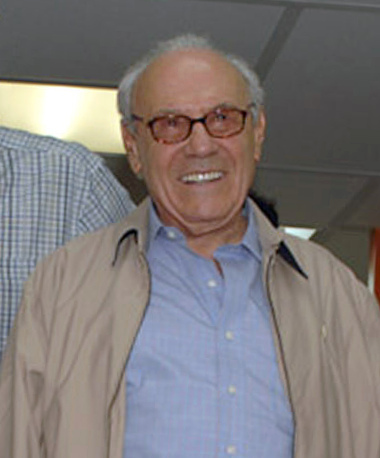
- Jaime Morales Carazo in 2009

Vice President of Nicaragua
- In office 10 January 2007 – 10 January 2012
- President: Daniel Ortega
- Preceded by: Alfredo Gómez Urcuyo
- Succeeded by: Moisés Omar Halleslevens Acevedo

Member of the National Assembly
- In office 9 January 2012 – 9 January 2017

Deputy to the Central American Parliament (PARLACEN)
- In office 9 January 2012 – 9 January 2017

Member of the National Assembly
- In office 9 January 2002 – 9 January 2007

Personal details
- Born: 10 September 1936 (age 89) Granada, Nicaragua
- Party: Constitutionalist Liberal Party
- Spouse: Amparo Vázquez Rovelo

Jaime Rene Morales Carazo (born 10 September 1936) is a Nicaraguan politician who was the Vice President of Nicaragua between January 2007 and January 2012.

== Early life ==
Born to Carlos A. Morales Casco and Anita Carazo Arellano in Granada, Nicaragua, he obtained a degree in Industrial Relations at the American Institute of Higher Business Management (IPADE-Universidad Panamericana, Mexico). Morales has been active in financial and business circles, entering politics after 1980. In the mid-1960s, he established the Nicaraguan Bank Group (BANIC), the first private banking investment and development firm in Nicaragua, which eventually became one of the largest of its kind in Central America. He also worked at the Institute for National Development (INFONAC) as a vice president.

He also co-founded the Central American University (UCA) and its Faculty of Economics and Management, whose board he subsequently joined. He participated in the promotion of the American Institute of Business Administration, and helped establish the National Technological Institute (INTECNA) of Granada.

== Exile ==
From July 1979, Morales Carazo lived in Honduras and Mexico. In 1983 he became involved with the Nicaraguan Democratic Front (NDF), later known as the Nicaraguan Resistance. He was a Chief Negotiator in the Sapoa peace process with the government of the Sandinista National Liberation Front (FSLN). He returned to Nicaragua in 1996.

== Involvement with the PLC ==
In 1993 he was responsible for the development of statutes for the Liberal Constitutionalist Party (PLC), re-written on the occasion of the Party's centenary celebration. In 1996 he was Head of Campaign for the PLC and the Liberal Alliance that won the national elections. In November 2001 he was elected National Deputy to the Legislative Assembly as a member of the Blue and White Bench, serving for five years as President of the Commission on the Environment and Natural Resources. During the administration of 1997–2001 he was Personal Adviser with the rank of Minister of the President and Chairman of the National Council for Sustainable Development (CONADES).

He was the campaign manager for the Liberal Alliance, whose presidential candidate was his godson Arnoldo Alemán, for the 1996 elections.

== Vice President of the Republic of Nicaragua ==
On May 28, 2006, Morales Carazo accepted the nomination to run for the vice presidency, as a running mate to Daniel Ortega, the FSLN and the Alliance "Unity Nicaragua Triumphs". Ortega went on to win the national election held on November 5, 2006. Morales Carazo assumed the position of Vice President on January 10, 2007.

== Deputy to the Central American Parliament ==
After leaving office, Morales Carazo was sworn in as Member of the Central American Parliament (PARLACEN) by Manolo Pichardo at a special event at the headquarters of the regional forum in Guatemala.

== Publications ==
- "Notes of Industrial Administration", University of Central America, Nicaragua, 1961.
- "The Mayor's Donkey", Editorial The Fish and the Serpent, Nicaragua, 1976, (Second Edition 2009, Editorial Esquipulas, Nicaragua).
- "Better than Somoza, anything!" Editorial CECSA, Mexico, 1986.
- "The Contra", Editorial Planeta, Mexico, 1989.
- "The Night of the President", Editorial Planeta, Mexico, 1991.
- "Negotiation Strategy & Propaganda", Editorial Hispamer, Nicaragua, 2008.
- "Earthquake Will he spend?" ARDISA Productions, Nicaragua 2010.

Political offices
Preceded by Alfredo Gómez Urcuyo	Vice President of Nicaragua; 10 January 2007 – 10 January 2012	Succeeded by Moisés Omar Halleslevens Acevedo
