= Jaime Chamorro Cardenal =

Nicaraguan newspaper editor and publisher (1934–2021)

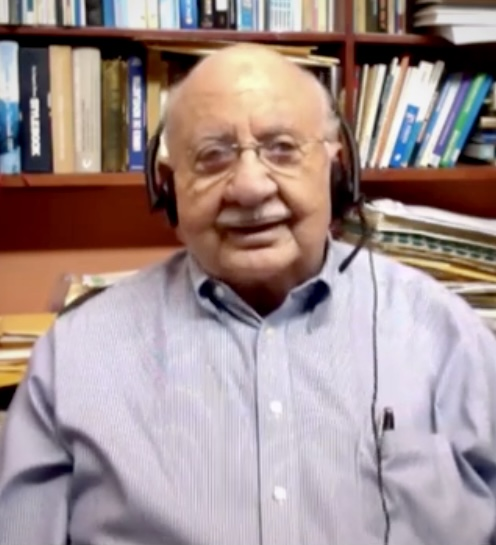
- Chamorro in 2019
- Born: 23 October 1934; Granada, Nicaragua
- Died: 29 July 2021 (aged 86)
- Education: University of Notre Dame
- Organization: La Prensa
- Title: Publisher
- Term: 1993–2021
- Spouse: Hilda Argeñal (m. 1961)
- Children: 5
- Family: Chamorro family

Jaime Chamorro Cardenal (23 October 1934 – 29 July 2021) was a Nicaraguan newspaper editor and publisher. A civil engineer by training, journalism was the family business, as his father owned the newspaper La Prensa. Chamorro joined La Prensa in 1974, where he worked for 47 years and served as publisher for 28, from 1993 until his death in 2021.

== Early life ==
Chamorro was born in Granada, Nicaragua, on 23 October 1934, to Margarita Cardenal Argüello and Pedro Joaquín Chamorro Zelaya, who had become sole owner of La Prensa in 1932. He had four siblings: Pedro Joaquín, Anita, Ligia and Xavier Chamorro Cardenal. He grew up first in the San Sebastián neighborhood of Managua, then from 1941 on El Triunfo street next to La Prensa, in a house built with the inheritance from his maternal grandfather’s death in 1936.

When he was 10, harassment from dictator Anastasio Somoza García forced the newspaper to close and his parents went into exile in New York. Pedro Joaquín, Anita and Ligia also left the country to pursue their studies, while Jaime and Xavier went to Granada, staying with their grandmother Isabel Argüello de Cardenal. Two years later, the paper reopened and his father returned, but by then Jaime was in school at Colegio Centro América in Granada, where he remained, making periodic trips to see his family in Managua. His father died in December 1952 and his brother Pedro Joaquín Chamorro Cardenal took over the paper.

Chamorro studied civil engineering at the University of Notre Dame in South Bend, Indiana, U.S.

== Career ==
In June 1959, following his brother Pedro Joaquín, Chamorro was part of the Olama y Mollejones movement, a group of guerrillas that sought to overthrow the dictatorship of Luis Somoza Debayle. He was jailed for eight months as a consequence.

After college he married and, feeling the family did not need another journalist, embarked on a career in his chosen field of civil engineering. In the 1960s he focused on his construction company, Chamorro & Cuadra Contractors SA, formed with Pedro and José Cuadra, but the company faltered after an unsuccessful highway project, prior to the 1972 Nicaragua earthquake. Pedro Joaquín advised liquidating the company and in 1974 he asked Jaime to take over direction of La Prensa's finances.

In 1978, Pedro Joaquín, then La Prensa’s editor and an outspoken Somoza critic, was assassinated, turning the tide of public sympathy toward the Sandinista National Liberation Front’s (FSLN) efforts to overthrow Somoza. However Jaime Chamorro later became a critic of the FSLN, particularly for the censorship of non-state media in the 1980s. The FSLN shut down La Prensa in 1986, accusing it of sympathizing with the US-backed Contras, and Chamorro, then the newspaper’s senior editor, left the country until the paper reopened the following year, under a new peace accord.

In the late 1980s he was also a leader in the Conservative Party. In 1987 he published Frente a dos dictaduras : la lucha por la libertad de expresión (trans. Facing Two Dictatorships: The Struggle for Freedom of Expression), comparing the Somoza regime to FSLN rule in the 1980s particularly as regarded suppression of speech. Discussing the book in 2021, he argued the Somoza dictatorship had been more liberal in this regard because they had not captured all the institutions the FSLN had, like the judiciary.

In 1990, his sister-in-law (the widow of Pedro Joaquín) Violeta Barrios de Chamorro was elected president and left her role at the paper, and in 1993 Jaime Chamorro became publisher of the paper.

In the 21st century he became at odds with the FSLN again, with the government blocking the import of paper, ink and other supplies for La Prensa in 2018 and 2019 before relenting. This followed on the protests that began in April 2018 in Nicaragua and the criminalization of independent journalists covering the unrest. However, Chamorro remained optimistic about the paper’s ability to adapt especially with internet-based work, telling vice-president Rosario Murillo that the paper, founded in 1926, would survive to celebrate its 100th birthday.

== Personal life ==
Chamorro married Hilda Argeñal (born c. 1939) in 1961 and together they had five children.

Chamorro’s mother Margarita Cardenal Argüello died in 1998.

Following a brief illness, Chamorro died on 29 July 2021, at age 86. At the time of his death, three of his nieces and nephews were imprisoned (presidential pre-candidates Cristiana Chamorro Barrios, Pedro Joaquín Chamorro Barrios, and Juan Sebastián Chamorro) and a fourth, journalist Carlos Fernando Chamorro Barrios, was exiled, in a crackdown by the FSLN government on opposition leaders a few months before the 2021 Nicaraguan general election.

He was buried the next day (30 July 2021) in Managua, in a private service observing precautions for the COVID-19 pandemic.

== Works ==
- Chamorro Cardenal, Jaime (1987). Frente a dos dictaduras: la lucha por la libertad de expresión (in Spanish). San José, Costa Rica: Libro Libre. ISBN 978-9977-901-62-6. OCLC 17364166.
- Chamorro Cardenal, Jaime (1988). La Prensa: the republic of paper. New York, New York: Freedom House; Distributed by National Book Network. ISBN 978-0-932088-25-3.
