= Claudia Chamorro Barrios =

Nicaraguan diplomat

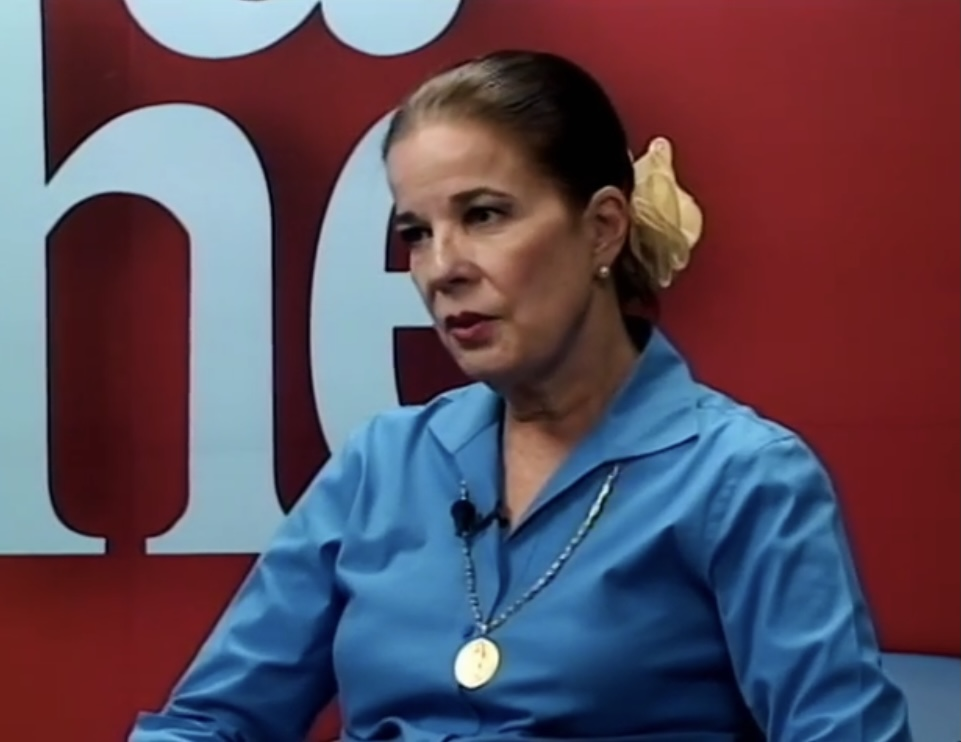
- Chamorro in 2016
- Born: 1952 or 1953
- Notable work: Tiempo de Vivir
- Title: Ambassador to Cuba and Costa Rica
- Spouse(s): José Bárcenas Edmundo Jarquin (m. 1986)
- Parents: Pedro Joaquín Chamorro Cardenal (father); Violeta Barrios de Chamorro (mother)
- Family: Chamorro

Claudia Lucía Chamorro Barrios (born 1952 or 1953) is a Nicaraguan writer, public health official, and former ambassador of Nicaragua to Cuba and Costa Rica. She served as a diplomat on behalf of the Sandinista government in the 1980s. She later became a critic of the FSLN. She is the author of a memoir, Tiempo de Vivir.

== Biography ==
Claudia Lucía Chamorro Barrios was born to Violeta Barrios de Chamorro, who became President of Nicaragua in 1990, and Pedro Joaquín Chamorro Cardenal, a newspaper editor critical of the Somoza regime. Her father was murdered in 1978, prompting sympathy to turn against the government. Until her father's assassination, Chamorro worked as an artist and the director of an art gallery, but then became active with the Sandinistas, and once they took power, she served as a negotiator for the junta and in ambassadorial posts in Cuba and Costa Rica in the 1980s.

In 1986 Chamorro was serving as Nicaragua's ambassador to Costa Rica, on behalf of the FSLN government. At the same time, her brother Pedro Joaquín was also in Costa Rica but working for the Contras, editing the anti-FSLN publication Nicaragua Hoy and serving as spokesman for the US-backed effort to overthrow the FSLN. But the siblings remained on good terms, their children playing together. That year, Chamorro married Edmundo Jarquin, then Nicaragua's ambassador to Mexico, who had worked closely with her father in the 1970s. It was Chamorro's second marriage. They married on the date that would have been Pedro Joaquin Chamorro Cardenal's 62nd birthday.

Chamorro later became critical of the FSLN. She called for Nicaraguans to boycott the 2016 election, saying FSLN leader Daniel Ortega's reelection to a third term as president was predetermined and a violation of the Nicaraguan constitution.

Chamorro is the author of Tiempo de Vivir, a 2003 memoir about her son's illness and death from leukemia. With her family she moved to the United States in 1991 to pursue treatment for him; Marcos Tolentino Bárcenas Chamorro died as a teenager in 1996. After her son's death, Chamorro began working at the Pan American Health Organization (part of the World Health Organization), then went back to school at American University.

Chamorro's other family members include her uncle Xavier Chamorro Cardenal, founder of El Nuevo Diario; her brother Carlos Fernando Chamorro Barrios, founder of Confidencial; and her sister Cristiana Chamorro Barrios, former editor of La Prensa and opposition candidate for president in the 2021 Nicaraguan general election.
