= Juan Sebastián Chamorro =

Nicaraguan economist (born 1971)

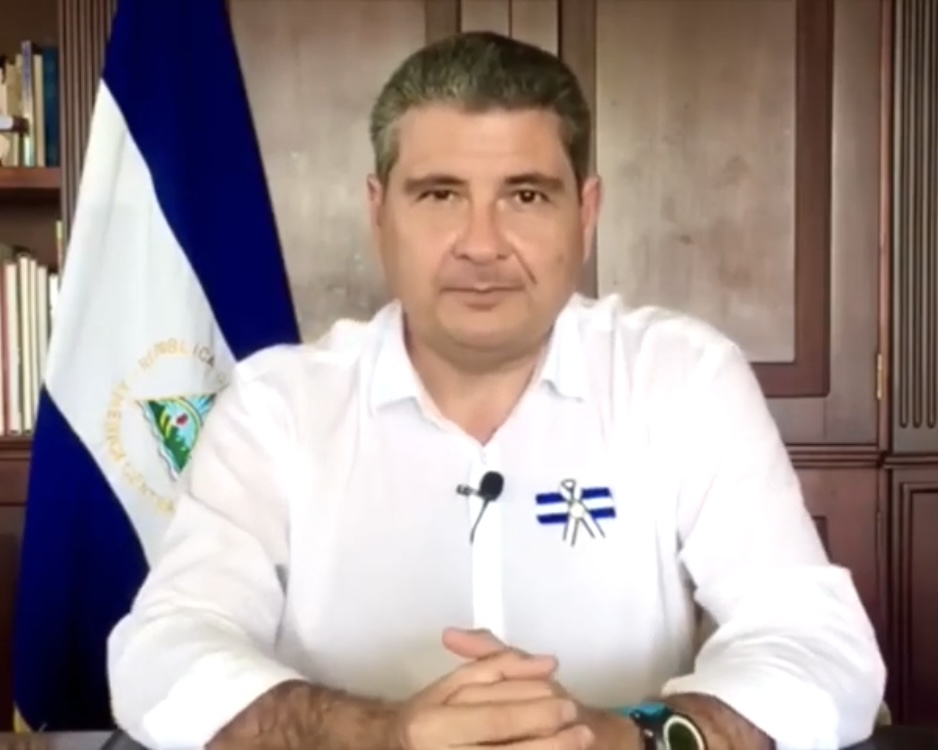
- Chamorro in 2021
- Born: 1971 (age 54–55)
- Occupations: Politician; Economist
- Father: Xavier Chamorro Cardenal
- Family: Chamorro

Juan Sebastián Chamorro García (born 1971) is a Nicaraguan economist, businessman and politician. He was a pre-candidate for president in the 2021 Nicaraguan general election until he was detained in a wave of arrests of opposition candidates and other civic leaders.

== Early life and education ==
Chamorro was born in 1971 to Sonia García and journalist Xavier Chamorro Cardenal who founded the newspaper El Nuevo Diario in 1980, part of the fallout from the assassination of his brother Pedro Joaquín Chamorro Cardenal in 1978, an event broadly seen as a turning point in boosting support for the Sandinista Revolution and its success in overthrowing the Somoza dictatorship the next year.

Chamorro had four siblings: Margarita, Gabriel, Ana and Francisco. He attended Colegio Centro América, then college at the University of San Francisco, graduating magna cum laude in economics. He earned a Master's degree in economics with a mention in social policies from Georgetown University, then a doctorate in economics from the University of Wisconsin-Madison, specializing in econometrics. His dissertation examined on property rights and their impact on the Nicaraguan economy.

== Career ==
In 1990, his uncle's widow Violeta Barrios de Chamorro successfully ran as a conservative candidate for President, defeating Sandinista Daniel Ortega and serving as President until 1997.

In 1997 Chamorro became director of agriculture policy at the Ministry of Agriculture, his first role in public service.

From 2002 to 2006, Chamorro served a number of different roles in the administration of President Enrique Bolaños: Director General of the Millennium Challenge Account Nicaragua; Deputy Minister of Finance and Public Credit; Technical Secretary of the Presidency of the Republic and Coordinator of the National Public Investment System.

Chamorro is executive director of economic think tank FUNIDES and represented the business sector in the 2018 National Dialogue, as a leader of the Civic Alliance for Justice and Democracy (ACJD) opposition to the government of President Daniel Ortega. The ACJD emerged in the 2018–2021 Nicaraguan protests. In January 2021, Chamorro stepped down as director of ACJD to focus on electoral politics.

He has called for election reforms in advance of the 2021 elections, including raising the percentage required to win without going through a runoff.

=== 2021 presidential campaign ===
In 2021 Chamorro García is an opposition pre-candidate for the presidency in the Nicaraguan general election. On June 8, 2021, Chamorro García was arrested, the fourth opposition candidate to be detained by the ruling party.

His cousin Cristiana Chamorro Barrios also campaigned for the position until being detained.

On 10 February 2023, along with 221 other political prisoners, Juan Sebastián Chamorro was released from prison and expelled to the United States after having his nationality revoked by the Nicaraguan government.

== Personal life ==
Chamorro married Victoria Cárdenas circa 1999. They have one daughter.

== See also ==
- Chamorro family
- Félix Maradiaga
- Arturo Cruz Jr.
