= Pedro Chamorro =

The name Chamorro may be both a patronym and a matronym. In Spanish speaking countries, the patronym is usually followed by the matronym to more precisely identify an individual (See Iberian naming customs). In English speaking countries, the matronym is frequently omitted, resulting in ambiguity. Omission of a given second or middle name further obfuscates an individual's identity.

The name Pedro Chamorro may refer to any of the following members of the Nicaraguan Chamorro family:

- Pedro Joaquín Chamorro Alfaro, president of Nicaragua
- Pedro Joaquín Chamorro Cardenal, assassinated editor of La Prensa
- Pedro José Chamorro Argüello, first politically active member of the Chamorro family
