= Pedro X. Molina =

Nicaraguan cartoonist

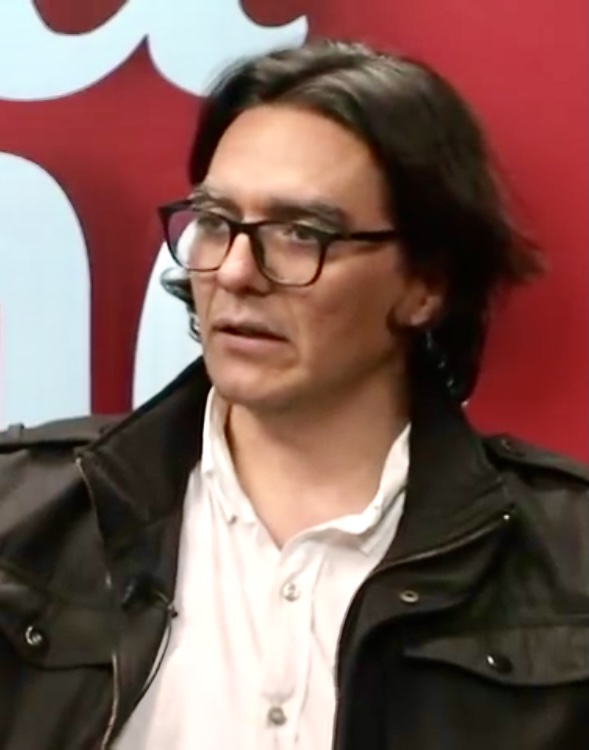
- Molina in 2018
- Born: Pedro Xavier Molina Blandón; 1976 (age 48–49); Estelí, Nicaragua
- Occupation: Caricarurist

Pedro Xavier Molina Blandón (born 1976) is a Nicaraguan political cartoonist who has worked for the news outlet Confidencial.

== Biography ==
Molina was born in Estelí, Nicaragua, in 1976. He was forced to flee Nicaragua when he was ten years old, escaping from the civil war in the 1980s, when Daniel Ortega was president. He returned to the country afterwards, attending Polytechnic University of Nicaragua but spending most of his time in the library that received the major United States periodicals, and studying the political cartoons they published. He published his first two cartoons in Barricada in 1995, and has since become a cartoonist for the digital outlet Confidencial. In 2018 he received the Inter American Press Association Cartoonist Category Award. Molina went into exile again in December of the same year, when Ortega's police killed a journalist, detained two others and ransacked the office of Confidencial, taking its press room. Molina was also subject to personal threats which escalated at this time.

Molina moved to Ithaca, New York, U.S., in August 2019 and became a resident artist of the Ithaca City of Asylum and a visiting scholar at Ithaca College. In 2019 he received the Maria Moors Cabot Prize, awarded by the Columbia University of New York City, being the third Nicaraguan to receive it after Pedro Joaquín Chamorro Cardenal and Carlos Fernando Chamorro Barrios, father and son, in 1977 and 2010 respectively. The same year he was recognized by Americas Quarterly as one of its Top 5 Latin American political humorists.
