= List of ambassadors of Nicaragua to Taiwan =

Coordinates: 25.118535°N 121.528981°E

Ambassador of Nicaragua to Taiwan
- Inaugural holder: Humberto Argüello Tefel
- Formation: August 30, 1960
- Final holder: Mirna Mariela Rivera Andino
- Abolished: December 10, 2021

The Nicaraguan ambassador in Taipei was the official representative of the Government in Managua to the government in Taipei until Nicaragua’s decision to recognize the Beijing government as the sole legitimate Chinese government.

== List of representatives ==
Diplomatic agrément/Diplomatic accreditation	ambassador	Observations	President of Nicaragua	List of premiers of the Republic of China	Term end
1960	Humberto Argüello Tefel	1960, Nicaragua appointed Humberto Argüello Tefel as consul before the Republic of China and another Asian country.	Luis Somoza Debayle	Chen Cheng	1962
1967	Carlos Manuel Pérez Alonso		Anastasio Somoza Debayle	Yen Chia-kan	
1970	William Tapia Alemán	Chargé d'affaires, the ambassador had his resistance in Tokyo	Anastasio Somoza Debayle	Yen Chia-kan	1975
August 16, 1975	Ricardo García Leclair	On August 31, 1975 he was accredited.	Anastasio Somoza Debayle	Chiang Ching-kuo	May 19, 1979
December 7, 1985		The governments in Managua and Beijing established diplomatic relations.	Daniel Ortega	Zhao Ziyang	November 9, 1990
August 25, 1986	Alfredo Alaníz Downing		Daniel Ortega	Zhao Ziyang	
August 23, 1989	Roger Antonio Baldizon Ibarra		Daniel Ortega	Li Peng	
November 5, 1990		The governments in Managua and Taipei established diplomatic relations.	Violeta Barrios de Chamorro	Hau Pei-tsun	
November 5, 1990	Pedro Joaquín Chamorro Barrios	(*1951), graduated from McGill University, Montreal, Canada.: A journalist and later politician who ran for mayor of Managua.; 1981-1984 he was co-editor of La Prensa (Managua).; 1983 political secretary of the Social Democratic Party.; Oldest son of Violeta Chamorro.; married to Martha Lucía Urcuyo.	Violeta Barrios de Chamorro	Hau Pei-tsun	April 30, 1992
August 1, 1992	Roberto Parrales Sanchez		Violeta Barrios de Chamorro	Hau Pei-tsun	1995
April 19, 1995	Salvador Emilio Stadthagen Icaza	From 2003 to 2007 he was head of the Embassy of Nicaragua in Washington, D.C.	Violeta Barrios de Chamorro	Lien Chan	December 16, 1999
February 26, 2000	Luis Alberto Wong Chan		Arnoldo Alemán	Vincent Siew	February 28, 2006
March 1, 2006	Juan Marcos García Borgen		Enrique Bolaños	Su Tseng-chang	November 30, 2007
January 29, 2008	William Tapia Alemán	(* 1945): From 1991 to 1992 he was first secretary in Tokyo, decorated with the Drug Enforcement Administration capture order	Daniel Ortega	Liu Chao-shiuan; Wu Den-yih; Chen Chun; Jiang Yi-huah; Mao Chi-kuo; Chang San-cheng; Lin Chuan; Lai Ching-te; Su Tseng-chang	October 25, 2020
October 26, 2020	Mirna Mariela Rivera Andino		Daniel Ortega	Su Tseng-chang	December 10, 2021
