= Carlos Fernando Chamorro Barrios =

Nicaraguan investigative journalist

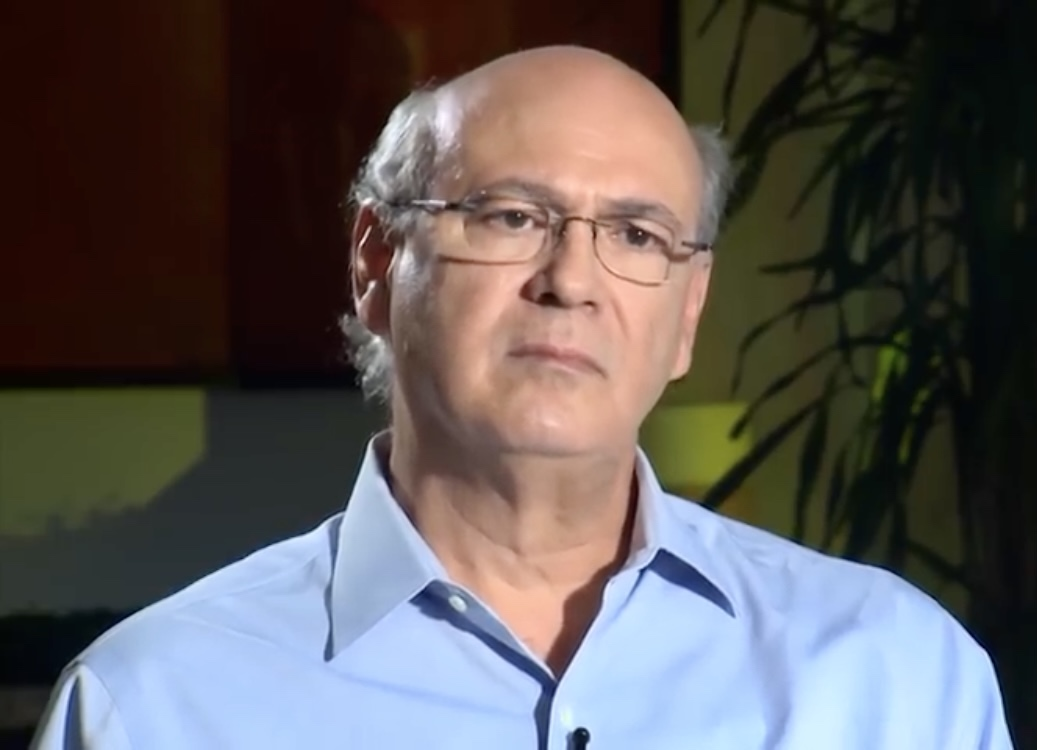
- Chamorro conducting an interview in 2019
- Born: 1955 or 1956 (age 69–70)
- Occupation: Journalist
- Organization: Confidencial
- Parents: Pedro Joaquín Chamorro Cardenal (father); Violeta Barrios de Chamorro (mother)
- Family: Chamorro
- Awards: Maria Moors Cabot Prize; Ortega y Gasset Award

Carlos Fernando Chamorro Barrios (born 1955 or 1956) is a Nicaraguan independent investigative journalist. He is the founder and editor of Confidencial, a news website and weekly publication combining investigative journalism and analyses of current affairs. He also hosts two television news shows, Tonight and This Week. Chamorro is the youngest son of former president of Nicaragua Violeta Barrios de Chamorro and Pedro Joaquín Chamorro Cardenal, a Nicaraguan journalist and editor of La Prensa who was shot to death in January 1978 during the Somoza regime (the paper was critical of the regime).

During the first Sandinista regime and through 1994, Chamorro was editor in chief of the government newspaper Barricada.

== Early life and Sandinista work ==
Carlos Fernando Chamorro studied at Colegio Centro America. He then attended McGill University in Montreal, graduating in 1977. He then returned to Nicaragua intending to study for a master's degree and then work to address poverty in the country. He instead decided to join the revolutionary effort to effect change for the nation's poor. Covertly, Chamorro received small-arms training, studied Marxism and joined the propaganda section of the Sandinista National Liberation Front (FSLN), becoming chief of the Agitation and Propaganda Department.

His father was assassinated the following year, prompting Chamorro to turn to journalism, becoming a reporter at his father's former paper La Prensa. Following the fall of the Somoza regime, Chamorro's mother briefly joined the Sandinista junta, but became disenchanted in less than a year and, with Chamorro's siblings Pedro Joaquín and Cristiana, returned to La Prensa, which she turned into an opposition paper again, but this time opposing the FSLN. This prompted a number of departures from the paper, including Chamorro who became editor in chief of Barricada, the FSLN's newspaper, which had taken over the physical plant of the Somozas regime's paper, Novedades. Meanwhile, his uncle Xavier Chamorro sold his shares of La Prensa to found El Nuevo Diario, which was sympathetic to the FSLN, and Chamorro's sister Claudia joined the FSLN government as ambassador to Costa Rica, while Chamorro's brother Pedro Joaquín left Nicaragua to join the Contras.

In 1984, Chamorro was in charge of publicity for Daniel Ortega's campaign for president.

In 1990, Chamorro's mother was elected President of Nicaragua, defeating the FSLN's Daniel Ortega. Chamorro had opposed his mother's candidacy, feeling it was counter-revolutionary and a sign of the weakness of the conservative party that nominated her. After she won, he remained at Barricada though it was no longer the government newspaper. It continued to be strongly sympathetic to the FSLN and critical of the new government, but also developed new editorial independence: expanding beyond a strictly political focus allowed for new reporting projects. This departure from strictly promotional material to including investigations that sometimes embarrassed the FSLN drew ire from some orthodox members and, following the party congress in 1994, the FSLN took back control of the paper. Chamorro and other top editors were fired.

== Independent journalism ==
In June 1995 Chamorro began the weekly television newsmagazine "Esta Semana" and Cinco, and in 1996, he founded the news website Confidencial. Chamorro was a Knight Fellow at Stanford University in 1997–1998. He spent the following year at University of California, Berkeley, teaching reporting on Central America and taking classes, as well as learning from US newsmedia like 60 Minutes and NPR.

In 2005 Chamorro began his daily news show, Esta Noche.

He won the 2010 Maria Moors Cabot Prize from Columbia University.

In January 2019, Chamorro went into exile in Costa Rica, after the police raid of Confidencial's offices on 14 December 2018, the same day they searched offices of a number of non-governmental organizations that alleged human rights violations by the government. Chamorro returned in late November of the same year.

Chamorro went into exile again in June 2021 after his siblings were arrested by the Nicaraguan authorities. He was also charged with various financial crimes.

In 2023, Chamorro was stripped of his Nicaraguan citizenship.

== Honors ==
In 2010, Chamorro won a Maria Moors Cabot Prize, administered by the Columbia University Graduate School of Journalism. The award citation said Chamorro "serves as an outstanding example of courage in standing up to abuse by an authoritarian regime."

In 2021, Chamorro won a Ortega y Gasset Award for lifetime achievement in Spanish-language journalism, awarded by El País. The jury for the prize commended him as "an emblem of the defense of freedom of expression."

== Personal life ==
Chamorro is married and has three children.
