= Freedom of the press in Nicaragua =

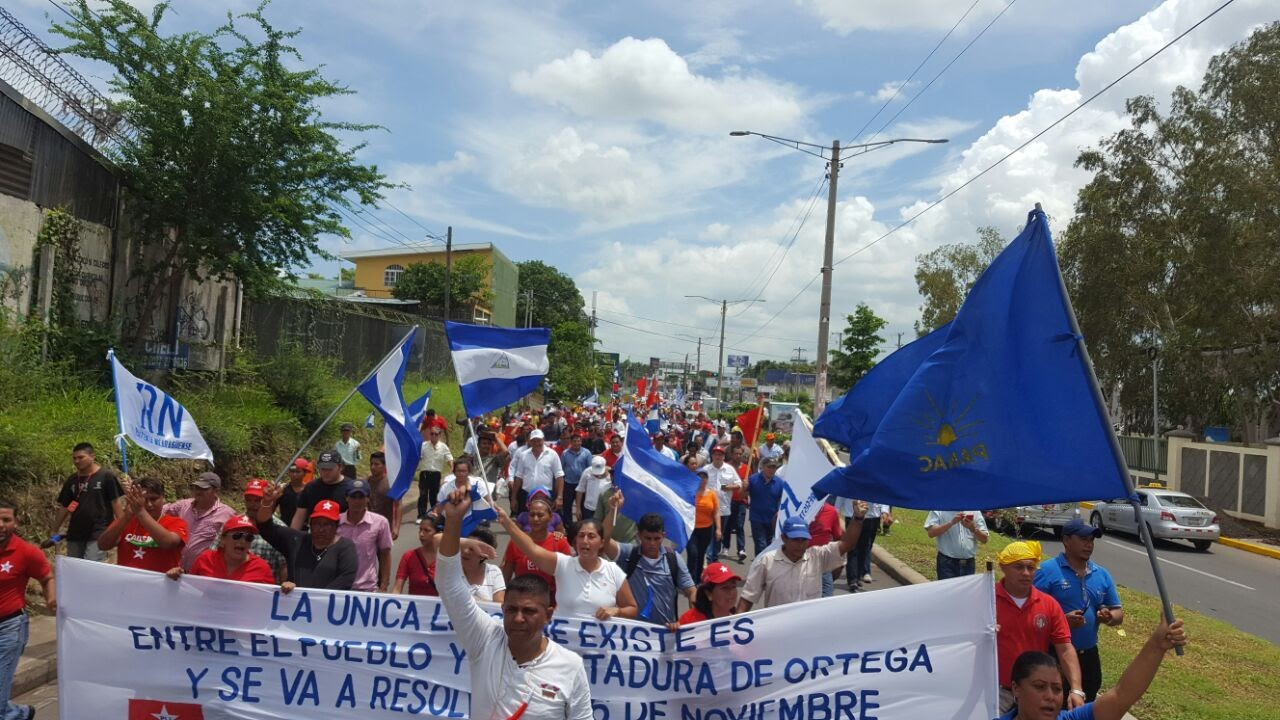
Nicaraguan citizens protesting against Ortega's presidency.

The Constitution of Nicaragua protects the freedom of the press. However, limitations imposed by the government have restrained the ability of independent media organizations to express divergent views on society and politics. Since 2007, freedom of the press has declined sharply, coinciding with the election of Daniel Ortega as president. Since Ortega's reelection, journalists in Nicaragua have faced escalating violence from the government. As of 2018, Nicaragua is ranked 90th on the Reporters Without Borders World Press Freedom Index.

== Attacks on journalists ==
Daniel Ortega's term as president of Nicaragua resulted in the creation of an oppressive and censored environment that caused a decline in freedom of speech. In situations where reporters are trying to do their jobs by covering anti-government protests, the president has tried to silence them through physical violence, arbitrary arrest, confiscation, and destruction of equipment. Journalists have been exposed to an environment of violence that has resulted in the death of at least 300 people and injuries to 2,000 people, as stated by the Nicaraguan Association for human rights. This proves the situation is only getting worse both for journalists and civilians.

Among the victims were Angel Gahona, a local TV producer of the news program El Meridiano, who was killed by a gunshot wound to the head while covering the protest on Facebook Live. The investigation of his death has been interrupted, but speculations are growing about soldiers being present at the moment of his death.

The abuse of power on behalf of the police, was also imminent as reporters from La Prensa were prevented from doing their job as they were threatened at gunpoint and insulted while covering a protest in Managua.

Not only local reporters have been victimized by the armed forces, so have foreign ones. Tim Rodgers, an American reporter was forced to leave Nicaragua, after a harassment campaign led by a group of sandinistas who believed he worked as a spy for the CIA.

Carl David Goette-Luciak, an Austrian-American reporter who was based in Nicaragua for past three years, contributed to media outlets such as British daily The Guardian and The Washington Post. He was harassed through an online campaign of threats originating from Ortega supporters, and his address was published online. Just as Rodgers, Goette-Luciak was accused by law enforcement officers of working for the Central Intelligence Agency (CIA). He was deported. One police officer alleged he was being removed from the country for attending illegal protests and distributing false information.

== Newspaper shutdowns ==
As of late-2019, La Prensa is the last remaining print newspaper in Nicaragua since the September shutdown of fellow opposition paper El Nuevo Diario over a refusal to release physical printing supplies by the Ortega government.

On August 12, 2021, La Prensa suspended its physical print edition, claiming the government refused to release newsprint imports. State-run media disputed the claim. On August 13, riot police raided the headquarters of La Prensa, reportedly cutting internet and electricity before removing boxes of material. Police stated they were investigating customs fraud and money laundering by the paper's managers and confiscated printing paper before allowing workers to return to the building with continued supervision. Media and opposition groups assert the raid against La Prensa is politically motivated, as it comes before the 2021 Nicaraguan general election, which has seen Ortega's government bar opposition candidates such as former La Prensa editor Cristiana Chamorro Barrios.

== Status of reporters without borders in Nicaragua ==
Reporters without borders (RSF) is an international non governmental organization based in Paris, France, and its objective is to defend the press freedom in the world. According to the RSF, Nicaragua's media is undergoing a crisis due to the constant violations of press freedom.

The lack of press freedom is backed up by the government and president Daniel Ortega as the established system encourages oppression and censorship that: “has made it extremely hard for the media to operate.” (RSF, 2018).

According to the Nicaraguan Association of Human Rights (ANPDH): “at least 350 people have been killed in the past three months.” The growing crisis has been manifested with physical violence, arbitrary arrest and confiscation, theft or destruction of equipment. Reporters attempting to cover the anti-government protests have often been directly targeted by soldiers and riot police. In response to such actions and as the situation continues, the RSF and the Inter American Press Association (IAPA), called on president Ortega in order to cease the current violations to reporters in Nicaragua. Reporters also manifested their intentions to open an investigation and punish attacks against journalists, as well, as to implement the proper measures to protect journalists and their families.

== See also ==
- La Prensa
- El Nuevo Diario
- Daniel Ortega
- 2018–2021 Nicaraguan protests
