= Pedro Joaquín Chamorro Barrios =

Nicaraguan journalist and politician

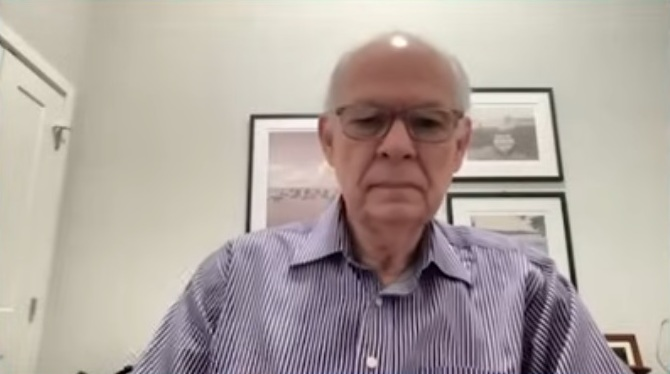

Ambassador to Taiwan
- In office 1991–1992
- President: Violeta Barrios de Chamorro

Defense minister
- In office 1997–1997
- President: Arnoldo Alemán

Deputy to the National Assembly of Nicaragua
- In office 2007–2016
- President: Daniel Ortega
- Constituency: Managua

Personal details
- Born: 24 September 1951 (age 74) Managua
- Citizenship: Nicaragua
- Children: 4
- Parents: Pedro Joaquín Chamorro Cardenal (father); Violeta Barrios de Chamorro (mother)
- Relatives: Chamorro family
- Education: McGill University; INCAE Business School
- Occupation: Journalist, politician

Pedro Joaquín Chamorro Barrios (born 24 September 1951) is a Nicaraguan journalist and politician. He began his career in journalism working at La Prensa, following the 1978 assassination of its editor, his father, Pedro Joaquín Chamorro Cardenal. Working on the side of the Contras in exile in the 1980s, he returned to the country in 1989 when his mother Violeta Barrios de Chamorro ran for president, and following her election, served as a Nicaraguan ambassador. He later became defense minister. In the 21st century, Chamorro has been a city councilor for Managua and deputy in the National Assembly, also for Managua. On 25 June 2021, he became part of a wave of arrests of opposition and civic figures in Nicaragua.

== Early life and education ==
Pedro Joaquín Chamorro Barrios was born in Managua on 24 September 1951. His parents were Pedro Joaquin Chamorro Cardenal, the anti-Somoza editor of La Prensa, Nicaragua's oldest newspaper, and his wife Violeta Barrios de Chamorro. He is the oldest of their four children; his siblings are Carlos Fernando Chamorro Barrios, Claudia Chamorro Barrios, and Cristiana Chamorro Barrios, among other prominent relatives.

Pedro Joaquín Chamorro Barrios earned a BA with honors in political science and sociology from McGill University, in Montreal, Canada, in 1974, then an MBA from INCAE Business School in 1976.

== Revolution and civil war ==
Chamorro's father was assassinated in 1978, galvanizing support for the Sandinistas who overthrew the Somoza dictatorship in July 1979. His mother became a member of the first post-Somoza Junta of National Reconstruction while Chamorro worked as a writer and photographer at La Prensa, to which his mother also soon returned after growing disenchanted with the Sandinista government. The paper, with a legacy of opposition from the Somoza era, again took on that role during the FSLN rule. Chamorro also joined the political opposition and was elected Political Secretary of the Social Democratic Party in 1983.

After his uncle Xavier Chamorro Cardenal departed the anti-FSLN La Prensa to start the FSLN-friendly El Nuevo Diario, Chamorro Barrios became co-editor, with Pablo Antonio Cuadra, of La Prensa from 1981 and continued until just after the 1984 elections, when he left Nicaragua following repeated harassment and censorship of the newspaper. Living in Costa Rica, Chamorro edited the anti-FSLN newspaper Nicaragua Hoy and served as a spokesman for the Contras, the US-backed effort to overthrow the FSLN. He became a member of the Contra Nicaraguan Resistance Directorate in May 1987.

While Chamorro was in Costa Rica, his sister Claudia was also there serving as Nicaragua's ambassador to Costa Rica, on behalf of the FSLN government. Despite the political opposition, the siblings remained on good terms, their children playing together.

== Presidency of Violeta Barrios de Chamorro ==
In 1989 Chamorro returned to Nicaragua and joined the campaign of his mother Violeta Barrios de Chamorro, who ran for president in the 1990 Nicaraguan general election as a coalition opposition candidate. She defeated Sandinista incumbent Daniel Ortega and was president of Nicaragua until 1997.

From 1991 to 1992, Chamorro was ambassador to Taiwan, reestablishing diplomatic relations with the country and promoting investments in Nicaragua. Subsequently, he returned to again serve as co-director and editor of La Prensa.

== Later life ==
In 1997 Chamorro was head of the Institute of Tourism (INTUR), serving as Tourism Minister until 1 September 1998 when he became Minister of Defense. From 1999 to 2002 he was executive director of the Nicaraguan Institute for Municipal Development (INIFOM).

In 2004, Chamorro ran unsuccessfully for Mayor of Managua. Running as a member of the Constitutionalist Liberal Party (PLC), then roiled by the corruption investigation of its former president Arnoldo Alemán, Chamorro earned 36% of the vote compared with 45% for the FSLN victor Dionisio Morenco. Chamorro became a city councilor.

In the 2006 Nicaraguan general election, Chamorro joined the Liberal Independent Party (PLI) and was elected to the National Assembly as a deputy for the department of Managua. In the 2011 Nicaraguan general election, Chamorro was re-elected for the 2012 to 2016 term.

More recently Chamorro has written a weekly column in La Prensa.

On 25 June 2021, Chamorro was part of a wave of arrests of opposition figures that included seven pre-candidates for president in the 2021 Nicaraguan general election (among them his sister Cristiana Chamorro Barrios and his cousin Juan Sebastián Chamorro) and roughly two dozen more opposition and civic leaders. Chamorro, a member of the opposition Citizens for Liberty Alliance party (ACxL), is accused of "acts that undermine independence, sovereignty and self-determination", that is violating Law 1055, a controversial law passed in December 2020 by the FSLN-controlled legislature that allows the government to detain anyone it designates a "traitor to the homeland". Most of those arrested are facing the same charges and all have been sentenced to 90 days of preventive detention. Candidates under investigation are barred from running for public office in Nicaragua. Two days before his arrest, Chamorro gave interviews to Univision and CNN in which he was asked whether, with the leading presidential pre-candidates detained, he would consider running; he answered, "In politics one must never say no...I would be willing to serve my country, as I have always been."

== Personal life ==
Chamorro is married to Marta Lucía Urcuyo and has four children.
