= Confidencial =

Nicaraguan newspaper

- Type: Weekly newspaper
- Format: Tabloid
- Editor: Carlos Fernando Chamorro Barrios
- Founded: 1996
- Language: Spanish
- Headquarters: Managua, Nicaragua
- Website: confidencial.digital

Confidencial is a weekly newspaper in Nicaragua, with offices in the capital Managua. It was founded in 1996 by Carlos Fernando Chamorro Barrios. Chamorro is the former director of the Sandinista National Liberation Front newspaper Barricada and the son of Pedro Joaquín Chamorro Cardenal, Nicaraguan journalist and former editor of La Prensa whose murder in the last year of the rule of the Somoza family influenced public sympathy for the FSLN rebels.

As a print newspaper Confidencial was known for its investigative journalism and critical analysis; this legacy persists, but now appears online. It is an opposition-supporting publication and is often portrayed as an independent news agency operated by a small editorial team. It is owned by the wealthy and influential Chamorro family and financed by the US National Endowment for Democracy.

Confidencial cooperates with the Cuba-focused magazine Havana Times, which is also based in Nicaragua.

In December 2018, the government took over the press room of Confidencial.

== See also ==
- Pedro X. Molina
