= Caroline Bird (American author) =

American author

- Born: April 15, 1915; New York City, New York, US
- Died: January 11, 2011 (aged 95); Nashville, Tennessee, US
- Other name: Caroline Bird Mahoney
- Education: University of Toledo; University of Wisconsin
- Occupation: Author
- Notable work: Born Female (1968)
- Movement: Feminism
- Spouses: Edward A. Menuez (m. 1934; div. 1945); Tom Mahoney (m. 1957; died 1981)

Caroline Bird Mahoney (1915–2011) was an American feminist author.

== Early life and education ==
Born on April 15, 1915, in New York City, Caroline Bird became the youngest member of the Vassar College class of 1935 at the age of 16, but left after her junior year to marry; she later earned a Bachelor of Arts degree at the University of Toledo and a Master of Arts degree in comparative literature at the University of Wisconsin.

== Career ==
Her books include The Invisible Scar (1966), Everything a Women Needs to Know to Get Paid What She's Worth (1973), Case Against College (1975), The Crowding Syndrome: Learning to Live With Too Much and Too Many (1976), Enterprising Women (1976), What Women Want (1979), The Two-Paycheck Marriage (1979), Second Careers (1992), and Lives of Our Own (1995). Her book The Invisible Scar, about the Great Depression, was named by the American Library Association as one of the 100 most significant books of the year.

Caroline's 1968 book, Born Female: the High Cost of Keeping Women Down, grew out of an article on discrimination against women in business that was rejected by The Saturday Evening Post. Years later when Sofia Montenegro, an award-winning Nicaraguan journalist and prominent feminist activist, was asked how she became a revolutionary, she said that she would never forget the book that had changed her life; she was 16 years old when she read Born Female: the High Cost of Keeping Women Down.

In 1977, Bird became an associate of the Women's Institute for Freedom of the Press (WIFP).

Bird was a consultant to the National Commission on the Observance of International Women's Year in 1977 and was the chief writer of its report, The Spirit of Houston (1978).

In 1979, the Supersisters trading card set was produced and distributed; one of the cards featured Bird's name and picture.

== Personal life ==
She married Edward A. Menuez in 1934 and they divorced in 1945; in 1957 she married J. Thomas Mahoney, who died in 1981.

== Death ==
She died on January 11, 2011, in Nashville, Tennessee.

== Papers ==
The Caroline Bird Papers, 1915–1995, are held at the Archives and Special Collections Library, Vassar College Libraries.
