= Havana Times =

Cuban blog and online magazine

- Type: Online magazine
- Format: Website
- Editor: Circles Robinson
- Founded: 2008
- Language: English, Spanish
- Headquarters: Managua, Nicaragua
- Website: www.havanatimes.org

Havana Times is a Cuban digital newspaper and online magazine founded in 2008. The online publication is edited in Nicaragua. Most of its contributors live in Havana, Santiago de Cuba and Guantánamo. There are also Cuban contributors in Venezuela, the Dominican Republic, Canada, Ecuador and Mexico and volunteer translators in the Netherlands, the United States and the United Kingdom.

== Overview ==
The project began as early as 2007, and the magazine was launched 2008 in Cuba, with Circles Robinson as editor. Robinson, a US native, moved to Cuba in 2001. He worked as a translator for ESTI, Cuba's official translation agency, but left Cuba after his work contract was not renewed in 2009, a fact that he associates with his role in Havana Times. As of 2009, Robinson edits the magazine from Nicaragua and makes occasional trips to Cuba to meet with contributors, who, he says, have suffered harassment and threats from Cuban authorities in several occasions.

Havana Times is published online in Spanish and English with no print version.

The Weekly Worker described the Havana Times as a "Cuban news and opinions website that neither consists of sycophantic Castro apologetics nor of its mirror image - the rabid anti-communism peddled by Florida-based Cuban exiles".

The Havana Times cooperates with the Nicaraguan weekly newspaper Confidencial, of which Circles Robinson is a columnist.
