= Antonio Lacayo =

Nicaraguan politician

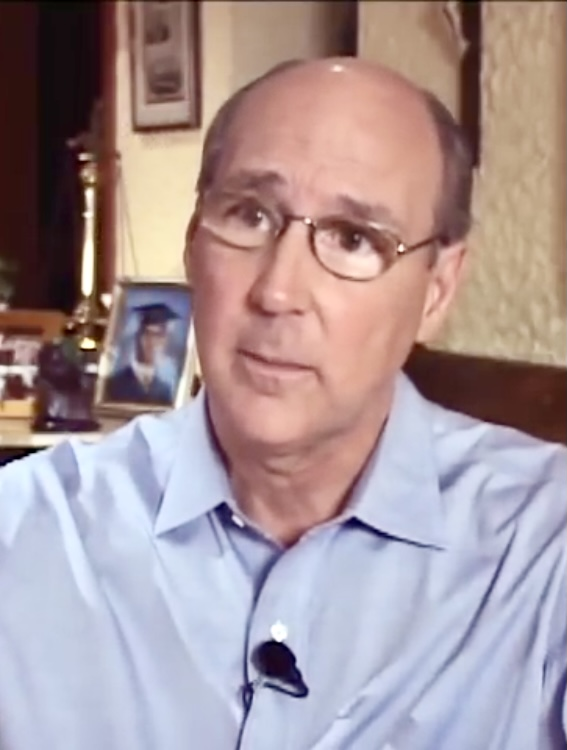
- Lacayo in 2005
- Born: 21 December 1947; Managua, Nicaragua
- Died: 17 November 2015 (aged 67); San Juan River, Nicaragua
- Title: Minister of the Presidency
- Spouse: Cristiana Chamorro Barrios

Antonio Lacayo Oyanguren (21 December 1947 – 17 November 2015) was a Nicaraguan politician who served as Minister of the Presidency from 1990 to 1996, during the government of Violeta Barrios de Chamorro. He was a central figure in the country’s transition to democracy. He was campaign manager for Chamorro’s 1990 run for the presidency that defeated FSLN incumbent Daniel Ortega. In 1991, he created the Nicaraguan currency, the Cordoba Oro.

== Life and career ==
Lacayo was a central figure in Nicaragua's transition to democracy. He was campaign manager for Violeta Barrios de Chamorro, mother of Lacayo's wife Cristiana Chamorro Barrios, during Violeta Chamorro's 1990 run for the presidency that defeated FSLN incumbent Daniel Ortega. Lacayo then served in Chamorro's administration as Minister of the Presidency from 1990 to 1996. In 1991, he created the Nicaraguan currency, the córdoba oro.

In 1995, Lacayo established The National Project (Spanish: Proyecto Nacional - PRONAL), a political party. In April 1996, he sought to run for the Nicaraguan presidency. However, his candidacy stirred political controversy in Nicaragua, as many politicians contended that the constitution prohibited relatives of current or former presidents from running for office. Despite leading in the opinion polls, he was disqualified by the Electoral Supreme Council, as it ruled it was unconstitutional for Lacayo to run because he was married to the daughter of then-president Violeta Chamorro. After the ruling, Lacayo stated, "I married this woman who is here by my side and I will never understand that the right to be president was denied to me because I'm married to a woman I adore."

== Death ==
In 2015, he died in a helicopter crash into the San Juan River. The pilot and two Americans, executives from Coca-Cola and Tampa Juice, also died.

== Publications ==
- La Difícil Transición Nicaraguense en el Gobierno con Doña Violeta (2005)
