= Sofía Montenegro =

Nicaraguan journalist, social researcher and feminist

Sofía Isabel Montenegro Alarcón
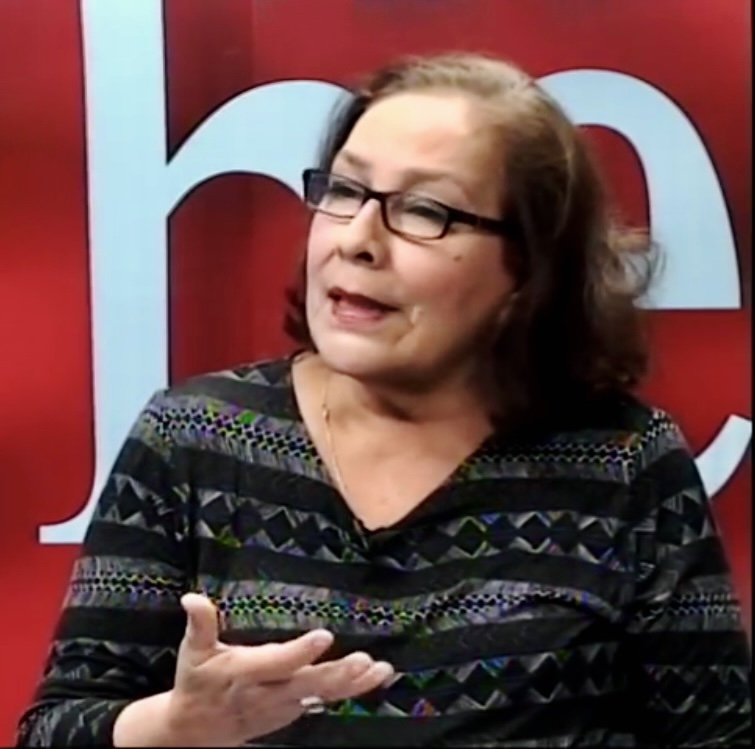
- Montenegro in 2016
- Born: 15 February 1954 (age 71); Ciudad Darío, Matagalpa Department, Nicaragua
- Occupation(s): Journalist, feminist
- Years active: 1979 -
- Known for: Barricada (FSLN); CINCO

Sofía Montenegro Alarcón (born 15 February 1954) is a Nicaraguan journalist, social researcher, and feminist. Montenegro's family were militarily aligned with the Somoza forces, but her feminist and Marxist studies moved her to join with the opposition to the regime. She fought in the Sandinista Revolution and though initially supportive of the Sandinista Party, later became an outspoken critic, saying it had moved to the right. She served as an editor of various divisions of the official Sandinista newspaper, Barricada, until 1994, when she founded the Center for Communication Research (CINCO) as an independent research organization free of government influence. She has written broadly on power, gender, and social interaction.

== Biography ==
Sofía Isabel Montenegro Alarcón was born on 15 February 1954 in Ciudad Darío, Matagalpa Department, Nicaragua. Her father, Alfonso Montenegro, was a major in Anastasio Somoza Debayle's army. In 1968, to protect her from the violence in the country, Montenegro was sent to live with her sister in West Palm Beach, Florida where she finished high school and was exposed to feminist thought and Marxism for the first time. She returned to Nicaragua and though she passed the university entrance exams, her parents chose to send her brother to school abroad, rather than educating a woman.

Initially Montenegro enrolled in the National School of Fine Arts to become a painter, but later changed to journalism at the National Autonomous University of Nicaragua and translated documents for foreign journalists to pay her way. She began writing articles for a Maoist newspaper published by the Movimiento de Acción Popular (Popular Action Movement). Despite her father's involvement with Somoza and her brother, Franklin Montenegro, being a torturer and member of the National Guard, Montenegro joined the Sandinista National Liberation Front (FSLN) in 1978. She struggled to overcome the fear that her family name evoked in the Sandinista movement and became estranged from her mother when she refused to intervene in the death sentence of Franklin, when he was caught.

=== Journalism ===
When hostilities initially ceased in the Sandinista Revolution on 25 July 1979, she became the international editor of the official Sandinista newspaper, Barricada, but suffered a stress-related breakdown. When she returned to the paper, she had to work her way back up the ranks, but soon was fired for her criticism of the Sandinista Party. Montenegro was asked to return as the editor of the editorial page of Barricada in 1984. For her historical essay, "Memorias del Atlántico" (Memoirs of the Atlantic) that was published in 1986, she won the José Martí Prize for Journalism in 1987 in Havana, Cuba. In 1989, she founded the weekly segment "Gente" (People) in the same newspaper, targeted to women and children's issues. She continued as the director of Gente until 1994.

In 1995, she founded and became the executive director of the Centro de Investigaciones para la Comunicación (CINCO) (Center for Communication Research) which evaluates how sex, gender, and power affect Nicaraguan society. The intent of the organization was to form an independent organization that is free from government bias to investigate and report on women's issues and the issues affecting the human rights of all marginalized people. In 1996, she participated in a short documentary film "Se le movió el piso: un retrato de Managua" (The Earth Moved: A portrait of Managua) produced by a French producer, Anne Aghion which won the Coral Award at the Havana Latinamerican Film Festival.

In 2000, Montenegro completed a study and published a book, "La cultura sexual en Nicaragua" (Sexual Culture in Nicaragua) evaluating the high levels of violence against women. She concluded that misconceptions and misinformation about sexuality and the rooting of women's identity in motherhood led to inequalities and a culture of violence. She has published many articles evaluating political empowerment, communications, and social participation.

=== Political criticism and feminism ===
In 1986, Montenegro founded and became part of the faculty for the Department of Gender and Communication Studies at the American University of Nicaragua. That same year, she became one of the main organizers and founders of the Partido de la Izquierda Erotica, PIE (Party of Erotic Left) with lawyer Milú Vargas and poet Gioconda Belli. The party formed in opposition to the campaign, criticized as macho, run by Daniel Ortega for the 1990 presidential election. Their goals were to make women's and family issues, which had traditionally been ignored, part of the political platform. Montenegro was one of the women who participated in the consultations in 1986, managing to add ten articles that addressed women's rights to the 1987 Constitution, but prior to the election, the women threw their support in with the Sandinista Party and ceased to exist as a separate party.

Around this same time, with fissures forming between the FSLN, its official women's organization, Asociación de Mujeres Nicaragüenes Luisa Amanda Espinoza (AMNLAE) (Luisa Amanda Espinoza Association of Nicaraguan Women) and feminist groups Montenegro founded the Movimiento Autonomo de Mujeres (MAM) (Women's Autonomous Movement). She is currently a member of its policy coordination committee and its political coordinator. The organization was founded to fight laws that might be unconstitutional or restrict the rights of citizens.

In 1995, when the Sandinista party split into the Sandinista Renovation Movement (MRS), composed of intellectuals who supported social democracy and the FSLN orthodoxy, who remained committed to the authoritarian policies of the revolution, Montenegro and Gioconda Belli aligned with the MRS faction. The push towards support of patriarchy and family-oriented definitions of women's roles, were seen as limiting women's economic and political rights.

Montenegro was an outspoken critic of Daniel Ortega's administration citing the lack of transparency, nepotism, and fundamentalism as failures of the administration to meet the needs of women and human rights of all citizens. After Ortega's 2006 reelection and criminalization of therapeutic abortion, leftist dissidents and feminists felt betrayed thus became more marginalized as Ortega moved toward more fundamentalist traditions.

Her outspokenness led to threats, attempts to discredit her, and government investigations of Montenegro and the other leaders in the women's movement for tax evasion. The “campaign to criminalize feminists for their struggle to reinstitute the right to therapeutic abortion" united feminists from Argentina, Belize, Brazil, Chile, Costa Rica, Dominican Republic, El Salvador, Guatemala, Mexico, Paraguay, Puerto Rico, and Venezuela, who sent an open letter to Ortega's administration denouncing the attempts to silence activists. Foreign aid has been jeopardized by attempts to silence critics.

In spite of the investigations, Montenegro has continued to speak against Ortega. She went to Washington, DC in 2015 to participate in an Inter-American dialogue. She also criticized a proposed inter-oceanic canal project, maintaining that it would threaten the quality of the water in Lake Nicaragua and environmental health.

Upon being asked how she became a revolutionary, Montenegro said that she would never forget the book that had changed her life: she was 16 years old when she read Born Female: the High Cost of Keeping Women Down by Caroline Bird.

== Selected works ==
- Montenegro, Sofía. "Memorias del Atlántico" Editorial El Amanecer, Managua, Nicaragua (1986) (in Spanish)
- Montenegro, Sofía and Adam Jones. "A woman and a rebel: Sofía Montenegro and the Sandinista revolution, conversations with Adam Jones". A. Jones, Montreal, Canada (1991) (in Spanish)
- Montenegro, Sofía. "Identidad y colonialismo: el retorno de la Malinche", Fundación Friedrich Ebert, Santo Domingo (1993) (in Spanish)
- Montenegro, Sofía. "La revolución simbólica pendiente: mujeres, medios de comunicación y política", Centro de Investicaciones de la Comunicación Managua, Nicaragua (1997) (in Spanish)
- Montenegro, Sofía. "La cultura sexual en Nicaragua", Centro de Investigaciones de la Comunicacioń, Managua, Nicaragua (2000) (in Spanish)
- Montenegro, Sofía and Elvira Cuadra Lira. "Jóvenes y cultura política en Nicaragua: la generación de los 90", Hispamer, Managua, Nicaragua (2001) (in Spanish)
- Montenegro, Sofía and Elvira Cuadra Lira. "Las claves del empoderamiento : sistematización de diez años de experiencia del Centro de Mujeres Xochilt Acalt", Centro de Investigaciones de la Comunicación, Malpasillo, Nicaragua (2002) (in Spanish)
- Montenegro, Sofía and Elvira Cuadra Lira. "La descentralización en Nicaragua: diagnóstico del proceso" Centro de Investigaciónes de la Comunicación, Managua, Nicaragua (2003) (in Spanish)
- Montenegro, Sofía. "Nicaragua : la gobernabilidad al sevicio de las reformas: primer informe independiente" Centro de Investigaciónes de la Comunicación, Managua, Nicaragua (2005) (in Spanish)
- Montenegro, Sofía and Elvira Cuadra Lira. "La búsqueda de lun liderazgo autónomo: la Sección de la Mujer en la Unión Nacional de Agricultores y Ganaderos (UNAG) de Estelí" Centro de Investigaciónes de la Comunicación, Managua, Nicaragua (2006) (in Spanish)
- Montenegro, Sofía. "Los medios de comunicación como actores políticos en Nicaragua: los periodistas, los medios y el poder" Centro de Investigaciónes de la Comunicación, Managua, Nicaragua (2007) (in Spanish)
- Montenegro, Sofía; Elvira Cuadra Lira; and Ángel Saldomando. "Nicaragua entre la democracia y el autoritarismo: Perspectivas, suplemento de análisis político, compilación", Centro de Investigaciónes de la Comunicación, Managua, Nicaragua (2009) (in Spanish)
