= Violeta Chamorro =

President of Nicaragua from 1990 to 1997

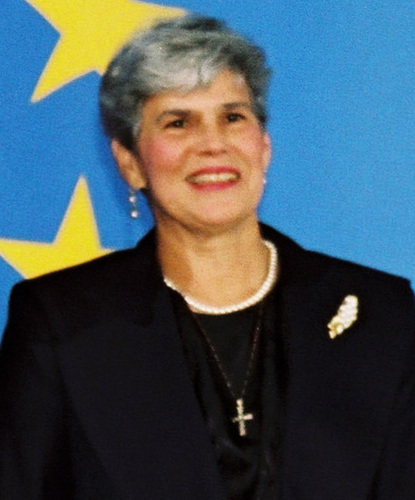
- Chamorro in 1991

President of Nicaragua
- In office 25 April 1990 – 10 January 1997
- Vice President: Virgilio Godoy (1990–1995); Julia Mena (1995–1997)
- Preceded by: Daniel Ortega
- Succeeded by: Arnoldo Alemán

Member of the Junta of National Reconstruction
- In office 17 July 1979 – 19 April 1980

Personal details
- Born: Violeta Barrios Torres; 18 October 1929 Rivas, Nicaragua
- Died: 14 June 2025 (aged 95) San José, Costa Rica
- Party: Democratic Union of Liberation
- Other political affiliations: National Opposition Union
- Spouse: Pedro Joaquín Chamorro Cardenal (m. 1950; died 1978)
- Children: Pedro Joaquín Chamorro Barrios; Claudia Chamorro Barrios; Cristiana Chamorro Barrios; Carlos Fernando Chamorro Barrios

Violeta Barrios Torres de Chamorro (Spanish pronunciation: [bjoˈleta ˈβarjos ˈtores de tʃaˈmoro]; 18 October 1929 – 14 June 2025) was a Nicaraguan politician who served as the president of Nicaragua from 1990 to 1997. She was the country's first female president. Previously, she was a member of the Junta of National Reconstruction from 1979 to 1980.

Her husband, Pedro Joaquín Chamorro Cardenal, was a journalist with his family's newspaper, La Prensa, which he later inherited. As a result of his anti-government stance, he was often jailed or exiled, forcing Chamorro to spend a decade following him abroad or visiting him in jail. When he was assassinated in 1978, Chamorro took over the newspaper. Pedro's murder strengthened the Nicaraguan Revolution and his image, as wielded by his widow, became a powerful symbol for the opposition forces.

Initially, when the Sandinistas were victorious over Anastasio Somoza Debayle, Chamorro fully supported them. She agreed to become part of the provisional government established under the Junta of National Reconstruction. However, when the Junta began moving in a more radical direction and signed agreements with the Soviet Union, Chamorro resigned on 19 April 1980 and returned to the newspaper.

Under her direction, La Prensa continued to criticize the government and its policies despite threats and government-forced shutdowns. When President Daniel Ortega announced that elections would be held in 1990, Chamorro was selected as the candidate for the opposition group known as the National Opposition Union (Spanish: Unión Nacional Opositora, UNO). This 14-party alliance ranged from conservatives and liberals to communists and because of ideological differences had difficulty in devising any political platform other than a promise to end the civil war. Despite polls indicating a victory for the incumbent Sandinista President Ortega, Chamorro won the election on 25 February 1990. Her election helped bring an end to the civil war through reconciliation and the demobilization and disarmament of forces belonging to the opposing factions. She was the first elected female head of state in the Americas. She was also the second woman to be elected in her own right as a head of government in the Americas, after Prime Minister Eugenia Charles of Dominica.

Chamorro was sworn into office on 25 April 1990. Chamorro's leadership covered six years marked by economic strife and social unrest, but she was able to compromise with rivals, maintain a constitutional regime, re-establish international banking relationships, and end the hyperinflation that had plagued the country for several years.

After leaving office on 10 January 1997, Chamorro worked on several international peace initiatives until poor health forced her to retire from public life.

== Early life ==
Violeta Barrios Torres was born on 18 October 1929 in Rivas, a small city near the Nicaraguan border with Costa Rica, to Carlos José Barrios Sacasa and Amalia Torres Hurtado. Her family was wealthy and conservative, and although she was often claimed by the U.S. media to have been of the Nicaraguan aristocracy, in truth, her family had large landholdings and cattle; they were more akin to the cattle barons of the western United States than the "Nicaraguan Gloria Vanderbilt" she was sometimes styled as in the American press.

She attended primary school at the Sagrado Corazón de Jesús (Sacred Heart of Jesus) school in Rivas and the French school in Granada. Barrios began her secondary education at the Colegio La Inmaculada in Managua and then transferred to an American boarding school, as her parents wanted her to perfect her English. She first attended Our Lady of the Lake Catholic High School for Girls in San Antonio, Texas, and then in 1945 moved to Blackstone College for Girls in Virginia. In June 1947, her father was diagnosed with terminal lung cancer and though he died before she could make it home, she returned to Nicaragua, without graduating in the United States.

=== Personal life ===
Violeta met Pedro Joaquín Chamorro Cardenal in 1949, they married in December 1950; subsequently, they had five children together. (Note: Their fifth child, María Milagros, died in infancy in Costa Rica in 1959.) In 1952, on his father's death, Pedro Joaquín inherited the newspaper La Prensa. He took over publishing and under his direction, the paper became a voice of opposition to the Somoza regime. Chamorro Cardenal was frequently jailed between 1952 and 1957 for the content of the paper and in 1957 led a revolt against Somoza. His actions resulted in his exile to Costa Rica, where Chamorro joined him after settling their children with his mother. Two years were spent in Costa Rica, with Pedro writing against the regime and immediately upon their return he was jailed again. Chamorro's life throughout the 1960s and 1970s was a repetitive cycle of reunions with either her husband or children. She followed him; if he was forced to leave, she left the children with family and traveled to be with him; if he was jailed, she was reunited with the children and visited him. Chamorro's earnings from a rental property that her mother had given her gave the couple a steady income. When her husband was assassinated on 10 January 1978, she took over control of the newspaper. She was in Miami at the time of the murder.

Over the years, Chamorro's family was split into feuding factions based upon political association. Two of her children, Pedro and Cristiana, worked at La Prensa, although Pedro left Nicaragua in 1984 to join the Contras. Her other children were active Sandinistas; Claudia was ambassador to Costa Rica and Carlos became the editor of the FSLN daily newspaper Barricada. In spite of the conflicting political views of her children, Chamorro encouraged and hosted family dinners during which she insisted political affiliations were temporarily put aside in the interest of family harmony.

== Sandinista Revolution and Junta of National Reconstruction ==
The assassination of Chamorro's husband sparked the Sandinista Revolution. His image became a symbol of their cause and when Daniel Ortega led the Sandinista guerrillas triumphantly into Managua in July 1979, Chamorro was with them. A coalition to replace the Somoza regime was formed. Chamorro represented the Democratic Union of Liberation (Spanish: Unión Democrática de Liberación, UDEL) in the first Junta of National Reconstruction (Spanish: Junta de Gobierno de Reconstrucción Nacional, JGRN), which also included Ortega for the Sandinista National Liberation Front (Spanish: Frente Sandinista de Liberación Nacional, FSLN); Moisés Hassan Morales, of the pro-Sandinista National Patriotic Front (Spanish: Frente Patriótico Nacional, FPN); Luis Alfonso Robelo Callejas, with the Nicaraguan Democratic Movement (Spanish: Movimiento Democrático Nicaragüense, MDN); and Sergio Ramirez Mercado for the Group of Twelve (Spanish: El Grupo de los Doce). This directorate, which initially promised an independent judiciary, free elections, free enterprise and a free press, was assisted by an 18-member Cabinet and a 33-member Council, whose membership represented a broad spectrum of Nicaraguan society. After the civil war of 1978–1979 and last-minute transferring of the national treasury to foreign banks by the Somoza regime, the country was devastated, and this facilitated the establishment of a Marxist-style government; however, the Sandinistas soon began taking over television and radio stations and censoring newspapers. Following the lead of the Sandinistas' mentor Fidel Castro, Cuban-style Marxism was implemented and Nicaragua increasingly took on the traits of a police state, in some respects. In others, while the Sandinistas did increase their ties with the Soviet bloc and embraced Marxist philosophy, they announced a non-alignment policy and continued discussions on diplomatic, economic, and military relationships with the United States.

In February 1980, the FSLN signed several accords with the Soviet Union, causing U.S. president Jimmy Carter, who had initially authorized aid to the Sandinista government, to approve CIA support for the opposition forces. On 19 April 1980, Chamorro resigned from the Junta in opposition to the Sandinistas' push for control, implementation of a Cuban interpretation of Marx, and failure to keep the commitments made in Puntarenas, Costa Rica, for the establishment of a democracy. Her exit prompted other members of the Junta to resign and join opposition groups that were beginning to form. She returned to her role as editor of La Prensa, driving it to become both an advocate of free speech and opposition thought. Her support of the Contras caused divisions in her own family and resulted in La Prensa's offices being temporarily shut down on several occasions. In 1986, following the dissolution of the Junta and his election in November 1984, President Ortega even threatened her personally with a thirty-year prison sentence for treason. That same year, she won the Louis Lyons Award from the Nieman Foundation at Harvard University; the award citation said that she had "resisted repression and censorship" and remained dedicated to a free press despite threats, redactions and suppression by the government.

== 1990 election ==
From 1987, a group of 14 political parties began working together in the hope of defeating the Sandinistas in the next election. By 1989, efforts by Costa Rican President Óscar Arias and other Central American leaders had persuaded Ortega to hold elections. He agreed not only to free elections, but to the monitoring of the process. The opposition bloc, now calling itself the National Opposition Union (Spanish: Unión Nacional Opositora, UNO) agreed upon a formula to select a consensus candidate. After five rounds of voting, Chamorro was appointed the presidential candidate for UNO. Her platform primarily consisted of two key promises: ending the civil war and ending mandatory military service. Other proposals included an amnesty for political prisoners and the adoption of free-market economic policies. The campaign also played heavily on her simplicity, her faith, common sense, and the image of her being the "queen-mother" and the wife of a martyr.

Almost all news outlets reported that Chamorro could not win. She was depicted as rich with no real experience. There were rumors that she received millions from the United States via their embassy and that she was a U.S. lackey; that she was too religious; and that her coalition was too disorganized, had no money, and was plagued by in-fighting. In reality, her humility and provincial roots worked for her; she had run a family, a business and been part of the original Junta; the Sandinistas blocked payment of funds to her from the U.S. while simultaneously claiming she received them; and she had long been vocal about her displeasure of U.S. involvement in Nicaragua. According to Peruvian novelist Mario Vargas Llosa; Humberto Belli, an editor of La Prensa and later minister of education; and other writers such as Edward Sheehan and Shirley Christian who have written about the country, Nicaragua is one of the most religious countries in Latin America. Chamorro's faith and support for free expression united those who had felt alienated by the Sandinistas. Her chief appeal though was that she promised peace to a country tired of war. Ortega spent large sums of money, and strutted around like a "macho rooster", as if the election were already won; he even used a fighting rooster as the symbol of his campaign.

The United States government was convinced Chamorro could not win without measures to "level the field". The George H. W. Bush administration wanted Congress to waive the prohibition of using National Endowment for Democracy funds to support a candidate and to approve a $9 million aid plan in addition to granting $3 million outright in assistance to UNO. Congress refused, as direct aid to candidates or parties was prohibited by law. Congress finally agreed to the $9 million package, only as per the legal requirements—meaning funds could only be used for election monitoring and observers, drives to increase voter turnout and must be fully disclosed. These funds were earmarked for building voting infrastructure, for vehicles and gasoline, salaries, poll watchers, office equipment, trips abroad to train poll workers and those registering voters, election monitoring teams, and as per the provision of foreign donations, $2 million was paid into the Supreme Electoral Council run by the government. In addition, the CIA covertly paid close to $500,000 (USD) to nearly a hundred Nicaraguans living abroad so they would return home to vote. The aid package ran into difficulties though: one month before the elections, only $400,000 of the money had been sent and it was deposited in accordance with Nicaraguan law into an account at the government-run Central Bank. The vehicles which were provided for in the aid package arrived in Nicaragua, but due to the customs director's vacation, the vehicles were not cleared, nor were tags issued for their use. Three weeks before the election, UNO officials reportedly had received only around $250,000 and accused Ortega's administration of delaying tactics and taking a share off the top. The government countered that the history of the Iran–Contra affair was a basis for caution and that the US itself was creating delays. Since the United States invasion of Panama had frozen Panama's banking system, a spokesperson for the Central Bank of Nicaragua stated that the Ortega Administration had no access to their funds which were deposited in Panamanian banks.

Up to 1990, Nicaragua had lived with forty years of the Somoza dictatorship, through a decade of civil warfare and Sandinista rule, and five years of US imposed economic sanctions. Because the election was to be held in the midst of a civil war, it was important both domestically and internationally that the vote was seen to be legitimate. The Esquipulas Peace Agreement which had been brokered by Arias, called for monitoring of elections by the Organization of American States and the United Nations, among other provisions. The election was the most strictly monitored of any in Latin America and involved 2,578 international observers among them former US president Jimmy Carter; Raúl Alfonsín, former president of Argentina; Alfonso López Michelsen, former president of Colombia; Rodrigo Carazo Odio, former president of Costa Rica, and many Caribbean and US dignitaries.

On 25 February 1990, Chamorro won the election with a 54.7% share of the vote, ousting the incumbent Ortega to become the first elected woman president in the Americas. (Note: There had been two previous women heads of state: Isabel Perón, who took over the rule of Argentina upon her husband's death and led from 1974 to 1976, and Lidia Gueiler Tejada, who was appointed as the interim president of Bolivia from 1979 to 1980.) Her victory came as a surprise to most observers. Ortega and his supporters conceded defeat without argument and observers left only a skeleton staff to assist with the handover of power. The two-month transition period was characterized by the so-called piñata sandinista, a spate of transfers of expropriated and confiscated property into the hands of the FSLN's members and leaders that became a complicated issue for the incoming administration.

Possible explanations for Chamorro's unexpected win include that the Nicaraguan people were disenchanted with the Ortega government, as economic mismanagement, a US embargo, and increased Contra activities in 1987 had, by 1990, decreased per capita GNI to 20 year lows. By November 1989, the White House had announced that the US economic embargo against Nicaragua would continue unless Chamorro won. Also, there had been reports of intimidation from the side of the contras, with a Canadian observer mission claiming that 42 people were killed by the contras in "election violence" in October 1989. This led many commentators to assume that Nicaraguans voted against the Sandinistas out of fear of a continuation of the contra war and economic deprivation.

== Presidency (1990–1997) ==
Presidential styles of Violeta Chamorro
- Reference style: La Honorable Violeta Chamorro, Presidenta de la República de Nicaragua (The Honorable Violeta Chamorro, President of the Republic of Nicaragua)
- Spoken style: Presidenta Chamorro (President Chamorro)
- Alternative style: Señora Presidente (Madam President)

Two months after the election, on 25 April 1990, Chamorro was sworn into office. The ceremony, held at the Rigoberto López Pérez Stadium before a crowd of some 20,000, marked the first time in more than five decades that a sitting government had peacefully surrendered power to the opposition. It was also the first time governmental change had been the result of a free election with substantial popular participation.

Social scientists who analyzed the elections concluded that the results were rational in the context that ending the war would also end the psychological threat that the US, which had invaded Panama in December 1989 and had been deeply involved in Nicaragua, might invade the country. Sandinista analysts confirmed these findings, determining that they had lost touch with what their constituency wanted. Marvin Ortega, who had conducted polls prior to the election, conceded that voters did not vote "with their stomachs", even though the economic situation was dire, but voted against war and the repression of their liberties.

=== Peace reforms ===
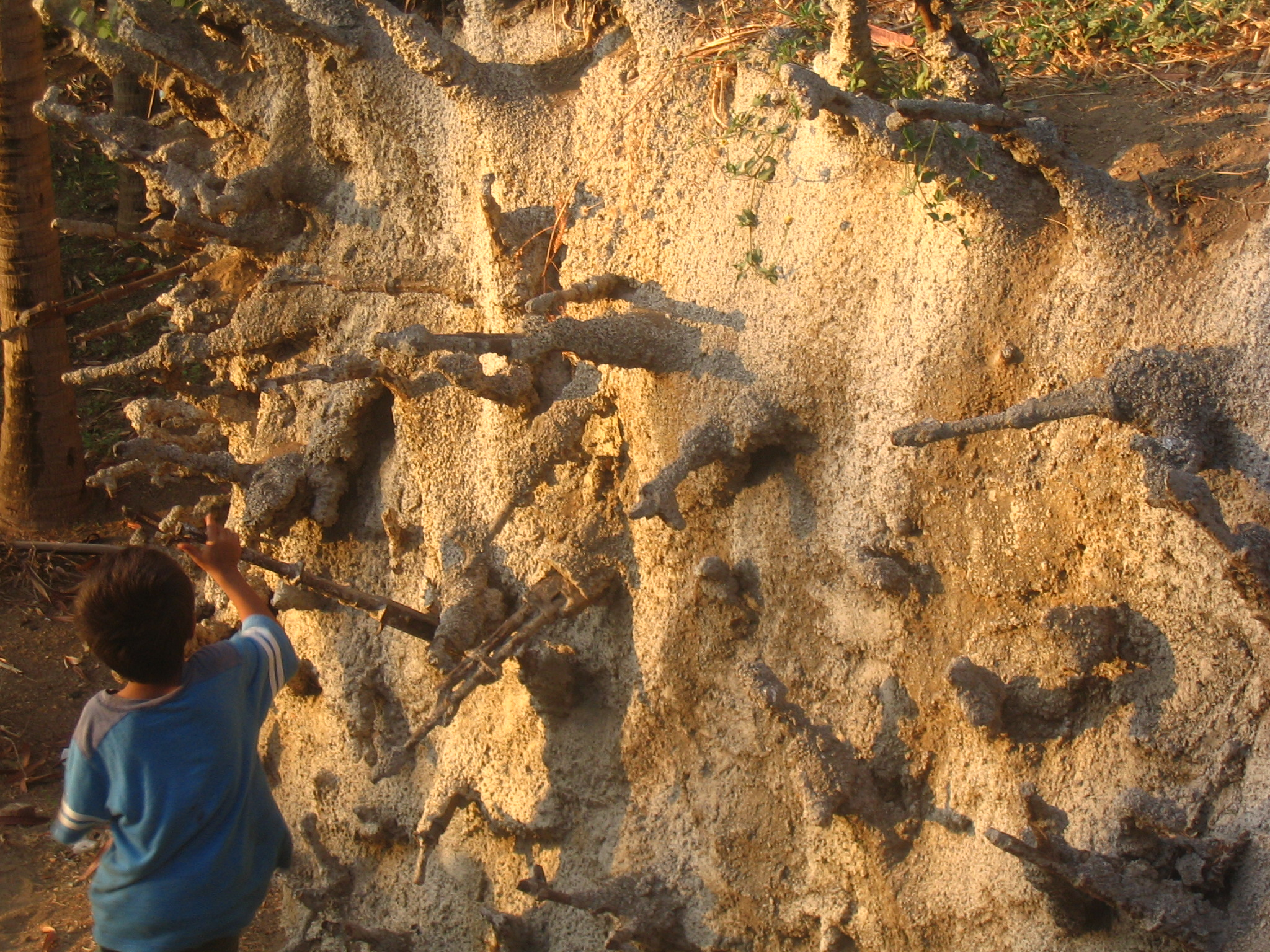
Cement-covered AK-47s held by unknown boy in Chamorro's Peace Park in central Managua

Chamorro's peace reforms are perhaps her most enduring legacy. Most noteworthy was her official declaration of the end of the war, as it was the pivot upon which all of her other policies depended. She maintained peace by reducing the size and power of the military, ending the national draft, and demobilizing the military. The day she took office, she abolished military conscription and within a few weeks had reduced the size of the Sandinista government's army by half to three-quarters. Demobilization included disbanding the US-backed Contras, thereby leaving the Sandinistas with no one to fight, and creating a highly effective peace. Chamorro also granted unconditional amnesties for political crimes, resulting in little room for protest from the Sandinistas, and enabling a smooth transition of power. One of the ways she secured the co-operation of the Contras was to seek help openly from local officials in collecting weapons from both sides of the conflict. She began a fierce weapon-buying campaign to help eradicate the threat of continuing violence; all the collected weapons were covered in concrete at the Plaza de la Paz (Peace Square), specifically built in downtown Managua to symbolize "Never Again".

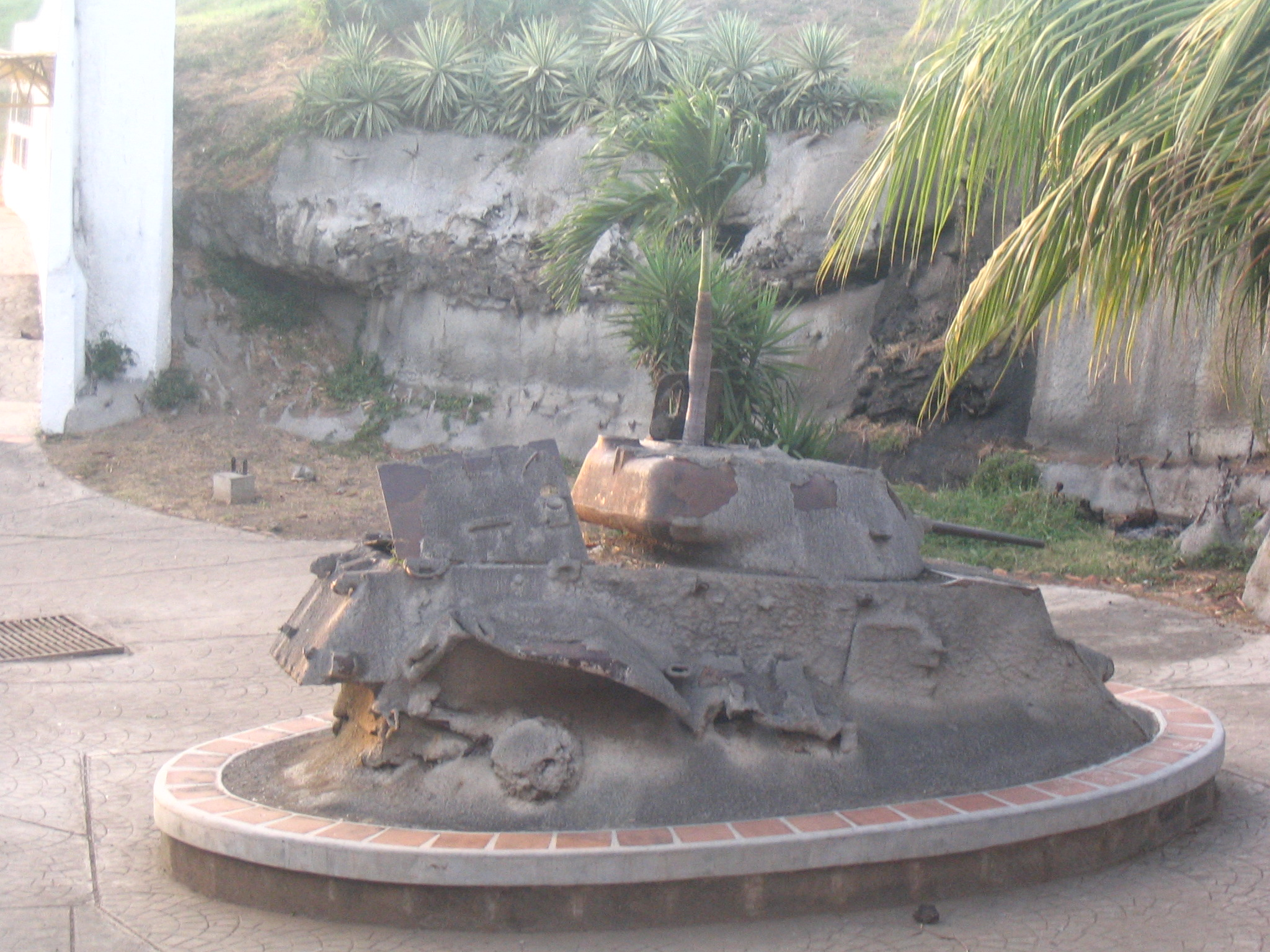
Cement-covered tank in Chamorro's Peace Park (Parque de la Paz) symbolizing the wish of Nicaraguans that their country "never again" be plagued by such violence.

The downside of demobilization was that around 70,000 military personnel were left unemployed. Most of the conscripts returned home, but the lives of career military personnel were disrupted as they lost employment, and the houses, land, and money which was promised to them was either not delivered, due to inadequate resources, or seemed to be paid arbitrarily. Since only 5.8% of the former officers had received benefits by early 1992, many believed that only those who had political favor had either kept their jobs, in the 14% of the military that was retained, or received their promised compensation. Between April and December 1992, veterans held a series of strikes in protest of the situation. Pockets of army veterans ("recompas") and resistance veterans ("recontras") threatened to re-arm but, realizing they had the same issues, the two sides joined forces. To pacify the groups, Chamorro integrated some of the former Contra fighters into the rural police services; she established a Civil Inspectorate to investigate claims of police abuses and human rights violations. She also allowed the Sandinistas' agrarian reform movement's redistribution of land to be maintained and expanded it on the Caribbean coast to meet veterans' demands. That action created conflict with the Caribbean indigenous people who had claims to the land, and also infringed on forestry reserves, leading to criticism. Others who had received land from the Sandinistas began to return their co-operative land titles to the large landholders who had owned them before the reforms, or simply sold their portions to opportunists. Unable to solve the problem, Chamorro dealt with the most egregious claims and turned the issue over to the courts to resolve individual disputes.

From the outset, Chamarro performed a delicate balancing act. Her choice to lead the National Assembly, Alfredo César, was rejected by the UNO vote, which chose Miriam Argüello. Chamorro kept her word to accept the vote. Her Vice President-elect Virgilio Godoy was in favor of hard-line policies to exclude the Sandinistas, but Chamorro retained Daniel Ortega's brother, Humberto Ortega, as a military leader. She claimed the position of Defense Minister and named Humberto Ortega to second-in-command as the Chief of Staff. For this, Chamorro's critics accused her of supporting the Sandinistas, but it proved to be a valuable political move. The president demonstrated that, for the good of the nation, she was willing to compromise in ways that fostered reconciliation. She also appointed three FSLN cabinet members, including one for agrarian reform.

=== US relations ===
When Chamorro was elected, President George H. W. Bush removed the embargo that President Ronald Reagan had imposed during Sandinista rule and promised economic aid to the country. In addition, the United States paid off the past-due debts of Nicaragua that were owed to private banks, the International Monetary Fund (IMF) and the World Bank. Some people in Chamorro's campaign team were hoping to get $1 billion in aid from the United States to help rebuild the country after the years of civil war, but the Bush administration instead gave $300 million to the country in the first year of Chamorro's presidency, 1990, and $241 million the year after. Given the devastation that Nicaragua had faced, this aid was not enough to make any serious improvement, and the renegotiated loans created even more debt.

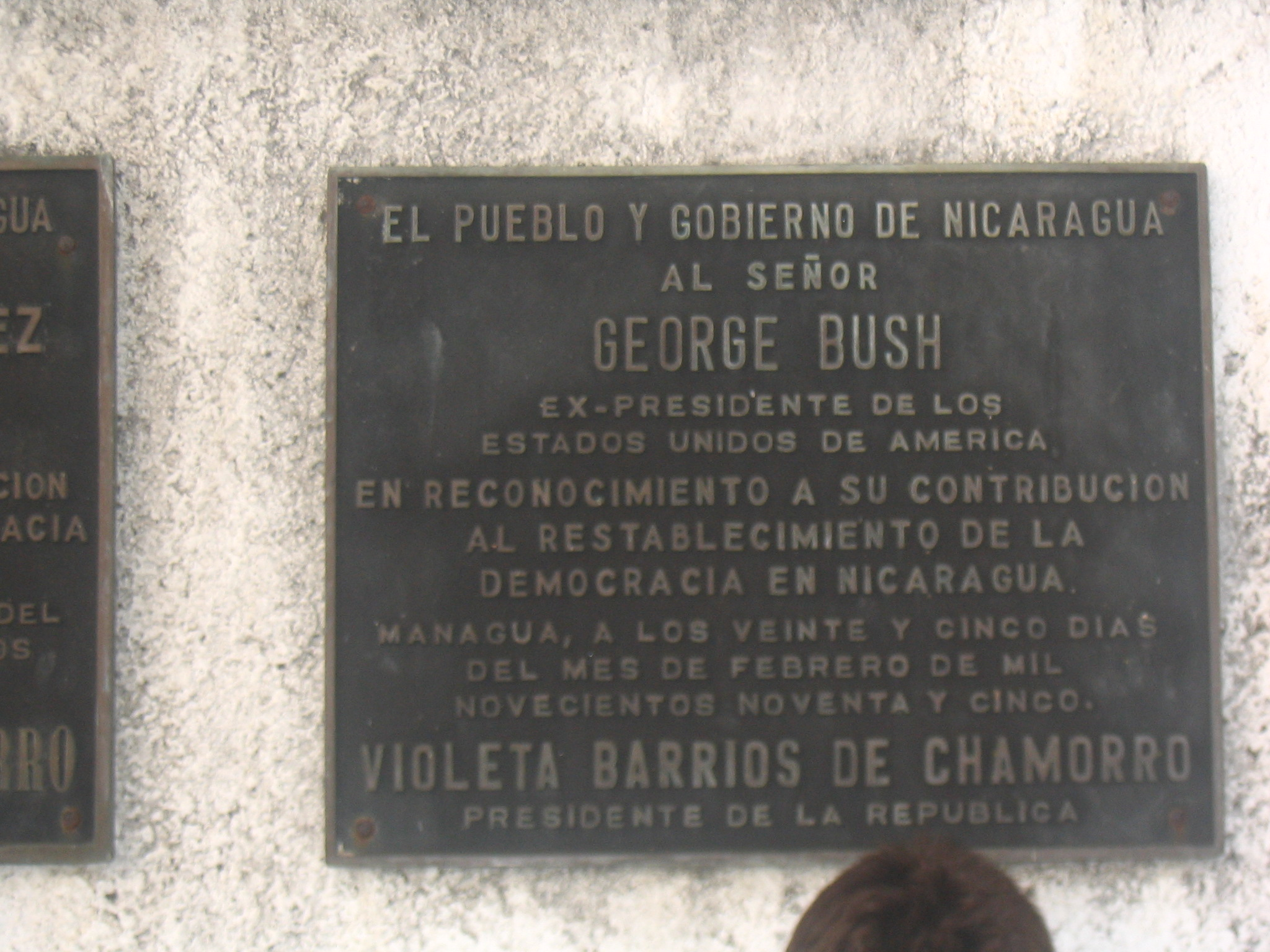
A plaque in Chamorro's Peace Park thanking US President George H. W. Bush for his contribution to the re-establishment of democracy in Nicaragua.

During Chamorro's presidency, US interest in Nicaragua declined, to the point that when Chamorro traveled to the US in April 1991 to ask Congress for more economic aid, few members showed up to listen to her. Because the Sandinistas were no longer a threat and peace talks were being established, US policymakers were much less concerned with Nicaragua than with issues in the Middle East. Hoping to improve relations, Chamorro's administration repealed the law that required the country to seek compensation in the International Court of Justice (ICJ) case of Nicaragua v. United States, which had long been contentious, and withdrew the suit. The United States had refused to recognise the ICJ's judgment, which had found five years earlier that the US had violated international law by sponsoring the Contras and ordered it to make reparations.

In 1992, Senator Jesse Helms attempted to cut off financial aid to Nicaragua. In his report to the Senate, he said that the Sandinistas were still controlling much of the Nicaraguan administration and suggested that the Nicaraguan government replace all former Sandinista officers with ex-Contras, replace all judges, and return all property that was taken from US citizens during the revolution. Chamorro's administration denied Helms's allegations while still trying to comply with his demands. Helms managed to sway opinion in Congress, and the US government denied Nicaragua the $104 million that had been promised for that year. The aid was cut off and Helms's demands were made the month after Chamorro withdrew the compensation claims associated with the Nicaragua vs. United States verdict.

=== Economic stability ===
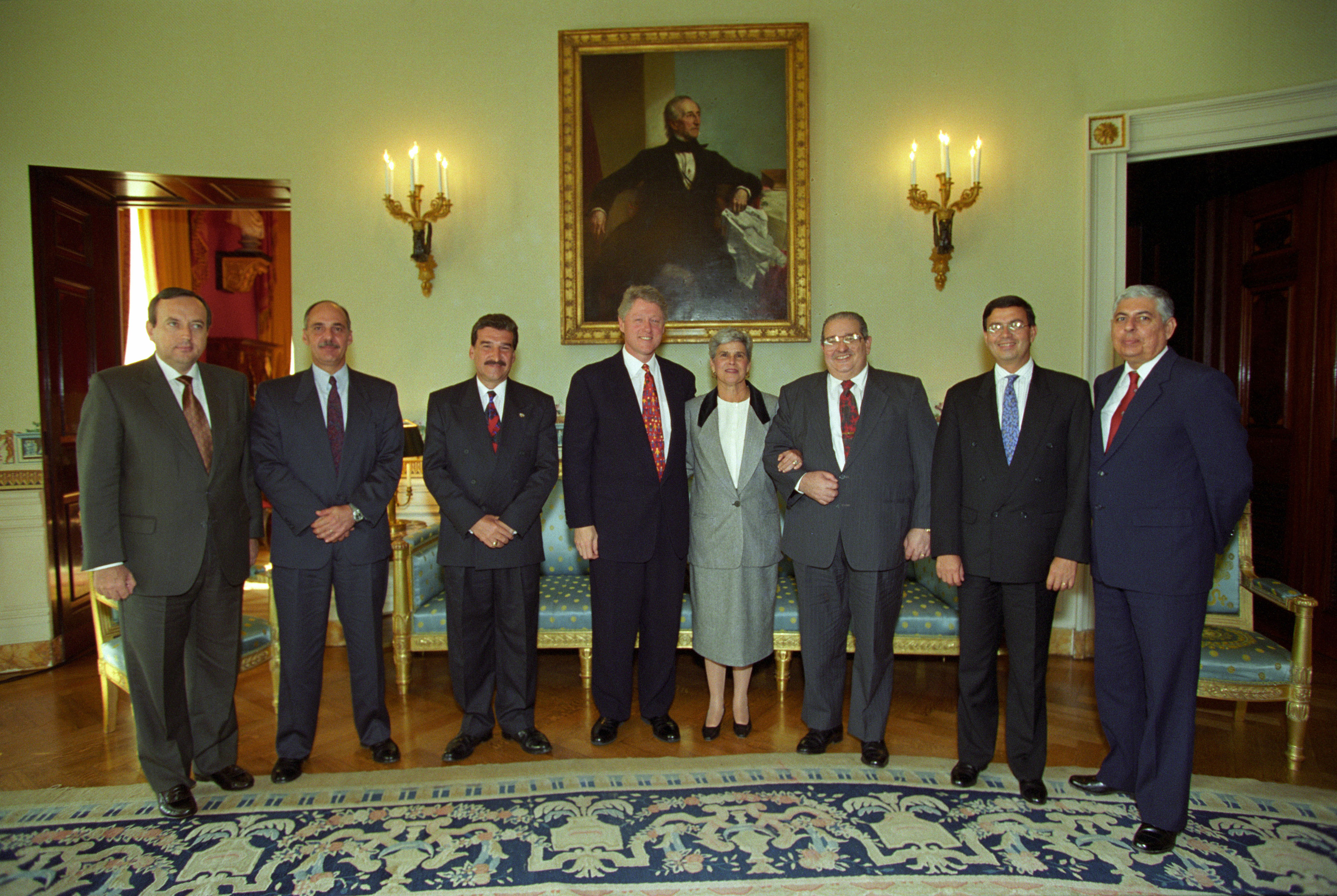
Chamorro with US president Bill Clinton and Central American presidents in the White House, 30 November 1993

Chamorro inherited an economy devastated by civil war and which had been struggling with hyperinflation – at one point, a rate of over 13,000% – since 1988. Economic mismanagement and nationalizations by the Sandinistas, along with US economic sanctions, had also damaged the economy. Chamorro's administration immediately set about trying to eliminate inflation. The neoliberal model outlined in the Mayorga Plan attempted to re-integrate Nicaragua into the world market, increase foreign investment while reducing foreign dependence, and increase privatization. First the government combined state enterprises into a holding company known as the Corporaciones Nacionales del Sector Público (CORNAP) and set about privatizing them. The goal was to raise capital by privatizing 90% of the CORNAP companies by 1993, but the response was slow. Next, the administration introduced the córdoba oro, which put Nicaraguan currency on par with the US dollar, but confidence in the new currency was never attained. One third of it was returned to the bank in exchange for US funds. Devaluing the currency and ending subsidies of basic consumer goods reduced government spending, but created unrest with lower-middle-class and working-class people, who were faced with rising prices, layoffs due to privatization, and stagnant wages.

In the opening months of the Chamorro administration, social programs were cut, including free bus tokens for the education sector, pensions for the elderly and disabled, child care and child development services, and health care initiatives. By 1991 the austerity measures adopted by Chamorro's administration were leading to massive strikes. Chamorro chose to recognize the workers' right to 25% of the shares of privatized state enterprises, despite the disapproval that generated both at home and abroad. The Sandinistas, who had removed some of the businesses from the private sector during their administration, were not in favor of privatization, but they were in favor of workers sharing in the revenues. The far-right of her own coalition was against making labor compromises of any kind. The US embassy and United States Agency for International Development both voiced displeasure at the concessions and speed with which the economic plan was being implemented.

In spite of the other programs implemented, inflation was reduced by the renegotiation of the country's debt (called for by the Lacayo Plan). Through negotiations, Nicaragua was able to obtain a writedown of 75% of their international debt on the condition that they had no arrears.

As noted previously, the US assisted Nicaragua in paying off the past-due debt to the IMF, the World Bank and the Inter-American Development Bank through bridge loans, and negotiating a 95% writedown of debts owed to Colombia, Mexico, and Venezuela. These measures provided the means to end hyperinflation and reopen monetary markets, but they were overshadowed by high unemployment, underemployment and an overall recession. The trade deficit rose and GNP declined, and overall low wages and reductions of education and health services caused poverty to escalate, and social tensions to rise.

Violeta Chamorro's years in power began a period of significant economic and social decline for Nicaragua. From 1990 to 2001, the country fell from 60th to 116th place in the world for human development, as measured by the Human Development Index, and became the poorest country in the Americas after Haiti, according to the United Nations Development Program. Public spending per capita on health fell from $35 in 1989 to $14 in 1995. Medical assistance for childbirth and diagnosis of female cancers were reduced. Child development centers established in the 1980s—which served 75,000 children—were eliminated. On the other hand, infant mortality in 1990 was 53 per 1,000 live births and went down to 37 per 1,000 live births in 1998 during Chamorro's tenure. Life expectancy rose from 62 in 1990 to 64 in 1998. Salvador Martí i Puig and Eduardo Baumeister indicate that between 1993 and 1998 rural poverty declined by 7% from 1,553,000 to 1,517,000. The poverty rate as measured as those living with less than $1.90 a day dropped by 33.33% between 1993 and 1998 from 36.3% to 24.2%. When assessed as those earning less than $3.20 per day, poverty dropped from 58.6% to 48% in the same period.

=== Constitutional crisis ===
Besides the economic issues which plagued the country, the constitutional crisis that occurred in 1995 posed a significant threat to maintaining peace. When Chamorro took office, she was governing under the Constitution of 1987, which had been drafted by the Sandinistas and provided for a strong executive branch and a weaker, compliant legislature and judiciary. In 1993, the legislature began to review the constitution to restructure the country's government. After a year of discussion, the changes were submitted to the National Assembly, approved in the first round of voting, and passed in February 1995. The reforms to the Constitution were intended to reduce of the power of the presidency, and included measures to transfer the authority to levy taxes to the legislature, prohibit conscription, guarantee property rights, and curtail the succession of an incumbent or their close family members. Chamorro refused to publish the changes in La Gaceta (the official journal of the legislature), stating that the legislature had overstepped its authority.

In response, the legislature published the revisions on its own, effectively creating a situation of dual constitutions. As it lacked a quorum, the Supreme Court was unable to act. To solve the situation, the legislators appointed six new justices, but the Court still refused to act, as doing so would be to accept the appointments and thus validate the new constitution. Chamorro choreographed a ruling from the Supreme Court which voided the Assembly's publication of the reforms, provoking the Assembly to refuse to acknowledge the Court's authority. As international investors began to fret over the ensuing instability and evaluate further aid, the Roman Catholic cardinal Miguel Obando y Bravo stepped in as mediator and brokered an accord. Chamorro agreed to publish the new constitution, as required by law, and the Assembly agreed to allow the president to continue to negotiate foreign aid and tax measures, though no longer by decree. One of the most contentious provisions, which banned nepotism, was conceded by Chamorro. Both sides claimed victory, though the Supreme Court issue was still not resolved: the Assembly insisted their appointees were valid and the President refused to acknowledge them.

As in other crises, Chamorro's ability to compromise was pivotal. The executive and legislative branches became more interdependent, but power was shared. The National Assembly prepared the budget, but the president had to be consulted on taxation; Supreme Court vacancies had to be agreed on by both of the other branches of government; and although the president retained the power of veto, the legislature could overturn a veto by a simple majority vote. Though some of the changes also included reform of the Code of Criminal Procedures—creating trial by jury, expanding the right of citizens to press charges, and evaluating police authority, among others—failure of the government to investigate past abuses by the police and the military or institute judicial proceedings, granted tacit impunity for those who committed human rights abuses or violence. Though the 1990 Amnesty Law had curtailed some of administration's ability to prosecute, it also lacked the funds, impartial judiciary and possibly the will to seek transitional justice. Sofía Montenegro, editor of the Sandinista paper Barricada, and others have argued that Chamorro would have dealt with past abuse if she had been able. Bishop Bernardo Hombach and others believe that her faith would have required her to forgive. Prosecutions would have prolonged conflict and harsh retaliation by the government would not have produced the reconciliation and peace she desired.

=== Gender consequences ===
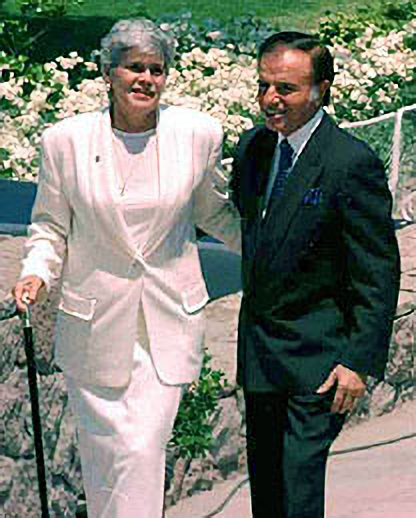
Chamorro with Argentine president Carlos Menem in Colombia, June 1994

Though 15 members of her parliament (16%) were women, few advances in women's rights were made during Chamorro's administration. Chamorro was not a feminist, since her beliefs prevented her from advocating many of the goals of traditional feminism. She was against abortion and questioned cohabitation, contraception and divorce. Cutbacks in public services during her regime, like child care and centers for rehabilitation, led to an increase in low-income women being forced into prostitution and crime. According to a United Nations study, the financial insecurity forced women and adolescents into "street professions", elevating security risks and increasing the rate of drop outs, drug abuse, juvenile delinquency and prostitution. In addition, austerity measures that eliminated free health care made it difficult for the poor to afford care. The Sandinista Workers Central (Spanish: Central Sandinista de Trabajadores, CST) stepped in to offer health care and child care to women who could not afford the new government plan. Chamorro did support women's rights to become property holders, and saw such ownership as a protection when divorce or widowhood deprived women of a husband's support. Her administration did not actively prepare or encourage women's participation in political life, nor did she appoint women to government positions.

The economic policies adopted by Chamorro feminized Nicaragua's labor force. While men's employment rate between 1977 and 1985 remained constant at 68%, women's employment outside the home in Nicaragua steadily increased during the same time frame with no reduction in the expectations of simultaneous work within the home. Women's participation in the labor market increased from 26.7% in 1977 to 32% in 1985 and by 1995 was at 36%, one of the highest participation rates in Central America. Though Chamorro's policies changed the nature of the formal work force by introducing more women, the policies did not result in corresponding income increases: wages remained stagnant and changed little over the decade.

The 1992 Sexual Crime Code modifications resulted in winners and losers. Previously, the Penal Code had the penalty for rape specified as 8 to 12 years in prison (compared to 6 to 14 for simple homicide). However, it also defined some lesser sexual crimes in a way designed to protect the interests of fathers and husbands more than of the women themselves; for example, the penalty for "kidnapping of a virgin [...] when her guardians were away or without violence" depended on whether marriage was intended. Victoria González-Rivera writes that prior to the 1992 changes, rape had been considered a private affair, and the law encouraged women to marry their rapists or accept a monetary settlement. UNO women and FSLN women in the National Assembly joined forces after Chamorro won the election and formed a Commission on Women, Youth, Children and the Family; they began to discuss reform of the sexual crimes law. Convincing 18 bipartisan legislators to introduce a reform, they asked for increasing penalties for rape (to 15 to 20 years), decriminalization for abortion if the pregnancy was the result of rape, and decriminalization of consensual sodomy. When the final bill passed, the approved version eliminated the exception for abortion for rape victims. Not only did it not decriminalize sodomy, but it increased the scope of the existing law to include "inducing, promoting or propagandizing" homosexual conduct. The new anti-sodomy law was the most repressive law of its type in Latin America, changing the imposed sentence for "anyone who induces, promotes, propagandizes, or practices sex among persons of the same sex in a scandalous manner" to as much as three years in prison. Chamorro rejected calls to veto the law and sent it for publication in La Gaceta, a legal requirement for a statute to become law. Lawyers immediately challenged the constitutionality of the law, but on 7 March 1994 the Supreme Court rejected their challenge.

== Post-presidency (1997–2025) ==
Chamorro did not contest in the 1996 general election since, at the time, the Constitution did not allow presidents to run for immediate reelection. The presidency was won by conservative Arnoldo Alemán, who – in an election described by observers as "flawed but fair" – received 51% of the votes cast over Daniel Ortega's 37.8%. The handover of power took place on 10 January 1997.

Chamorro retired from politics after her presidential term ended. In July 1997, she established a foundation bearing her name (Spanish: Fundación Violeta Barrios de Chamorro), which she chaired, intended to create development projects to strengthen peace initiatives; it ceased operations in Nicaragua in 2021 under pressure from Ortega, who returned to power in 2007. She joined the Carter Center's Council of Presidents and Prime Ministers of the Americas Program, which works for co-operation and peace throughout the Americas. Chamorro was also a member of the Inter-American Dialogue.

She left Nicaragua, and the family home in Managua she had shared with her late husband, for Costa Rica in October 2023.

=== Illness and death ===
Chamorro suffered from poor health and had several surgeries to correct problems with osteoporosis. During her presidential campaign, she was on crutches most of the time due to a fractured kneecap as a result of her osteoporosis. She later developed a brain tumor, which kept her out of public life.

Chamorro died in San José, Costa Rica, on 14 June 2025, at the age of 95. Her family announced that she would be buried in Costa Rica, where she will remain "until Nicaragua is once again a republic". Her funeral took place on 16 June in the Templo Votivo Santuario Nacional Sagrado Corazón de Jesús, in San José, less than 300 metres from the Nicaraguan Embassy in Costa Rica. Former Costa Rican presidents Óscar Arias and Luis Guillermo Solís attended. She was buried the following day in her uncle's tomb in San José's General Cemetery.

== Awards ==
- Isaiah Thomas Award in Publishing from the Rochester Institute of Technology.
- 1986 – Louis M. Lyons Award for Conscience and Integrity in Journalism.
- 1991 – Democracy Award from the National Endowment for Democracy.
- 1997 – Path to Peace Award from the Path to Peace Foundation.
- 2001 – Award for Leadership in Global Trade.

== Autobiography ==
- Barrios de Chamorro, Violeta; Fernández, Guido; Cruz de Baltodano, Sonia (1996). Sueños del corazón: Memorias [Dreams of the Heart: The Autobiography of President Violeta Barrios de Chamorro of Nicaragua]. Simon & Schuster. ISBN 9780684810553.

== See also ==
- Chamorro (family)

== Sources ==
- Anderson, Leslie E.; Dodd, Lawrence C. (2009). Learning Democracy: Citizen Engagement and Electoral Choice in Nicaragua, 1990–2001. University of Chicago Press. ISBN 978-0-226-01974-1.
- Arnson, Cynthia; Holiday, David (1991). Fitful Peace: Human Rights and Reconciliation in Nicaragua Under the Chamorro Government. Human Rights Watch. ISBN 978-1-56432-034-6.
- Baldwin, Louis (1996). Women of strength: biographies of 106 who have excelled in traditionally male fields, A.D. 61 to the present. Jefferson, North Carolina: McFarland. ISBN 978-0-7864-0250-2.
- Beckman, Peter R.; D'Amico, Francine, eds. (1995). Women in world politics: an introduction. Westport, Connecticut: Bergin & Garvey. ISBN 0-89789-410-3.
- Borland, Katherine (2006). Unmasking Class, Gender, and Sexuality in Nicaraguan Festival. University of Arizona Press. ISBN 978-0-8165-2511-9.
- Bothmann, Astrid (2015). Transitional Justice in Nicaragua 1990–2012: Drawing a Line Under the Past. Springer. ISBN 978-3-658-10503-7.
- Chamorro, Violeta Barrios de (1996). Dreams of the Heart: The Autobiography of President Violeta Barrios de Chamorro of Nicaragua. New York, New York: Simon & Schuster. ISBN 0-684-81055-7.
- Chavez Metoyer, Cynthia (2000). Women and the State in Post-Sandinista Nicaragua. Lynne Rienner Publishers. ISBN 978-1-55587-751-4.
- Close, David (1999). Nicaragua: The Chamorro Years. Lynne Rienner Publishers. ISBN 978-1-55587-643-2.
- Coerver, Don M.; Hall, Linda Biesele (1999). Tangled Destinies: Latin America and the United States. UNM Press. ISBN 978-0-8263-2117-6.
- Fernandez Jilberto, Alex E.; Mommen, Andre (2012). Liberalization in the Developing World: Institutional and Economic Changes in Latin America, Africa and Asia. Routledge. ISBN 978-1-134-82583-7.
- González-Rivera, Victoria (2011). Before the Revolution: Women's Rights and Right-wing Politics in Nicaragua, 1821–1979. Penn State Press. ISBN 978-0-271-04870-3.
- Guillermoprieto, Alma (1995). The heart that bleeds: Latin America now. Vintage Books. ISBN 978-0-679-75795-5.
- Hamilton, Lee H.; Inouye, Daniel K. (1995). Report of the Congressional Committees Investigating the Iran/Contra Affair. DIANE Publishing. ISBN 978-0-7881-2602-4.
- Keen, Benjamin; Haynes, Keith (2012). A History of Latin America. Cengage Learning. ISBN 978-1-111-84141-6.
- Korgen, Jeffry Odell (2007). Solidarity will transform the World. Orbis Books. ISBN 978-1-60833-049-2.
- Leiken, Robert S. (2003). Why Nicaragua vanished : a story of reporters and revolutionaries / Robert S. Leiken. Lanham, Md.: Rowman & Littlefield Publishers. ISBN 978-0-7425-2342-5.
- LeoGrande, William M. (2000). Our Own Backyard: The United States in Central America, 1977–1992. Univ of North Carolina Press. ISBN 978-0-8078-4857-9.
- Moreno, Dario (1994). The Struggle for Peace in Central America. University Press of Florida. ISBN 978-0-8130-1274-2.
- Santa-Cruz, Arturo (2013). International Election Monitoring, Sovereignty, and the Western Hemisphere: The Emergence of an International Norm. Routledge. ISBN 978-1-135-48396-8.
- Skard, Torild (2014). Women of power: Half a century of female presidents and prime ministers worldwide. Policy Press. ISBN 978-1-4473-1637-4.
- Skidmore, Thomas E.; Smith, Peter H. (1997). Modern Latin America. Oxford University Press. ISBN 978-0-19-510017-4.
- Staten, Clifford L. (2010). The History of Nicaragua. ABC-CLIO. ISBN 978-0-313-36038-1.
- Steinmetz, Sara (1994). Democratic Transition and Human Rights: Perspectives on U.S. Foreign Policy. Albany, New York: SUNY Press. ISBN 978-0-7914-1433-0.
- Taylor, Lance (1993). The Rocky Road to Reform: Adjustment, Income Distribution, and Growth in the Developing World. MIT Press. ISBN 978-0-262-20093-6.
- Vanden, Harry E.; Prevost, Gary (2002). Politics of Latin America: The Power Game. Oxford University Press. ISBN 978-0-19-512317-3.
- Walker, Thomas W. (1997). Nicaragua without illusions: regime transition and structural adjustment in the 1990s. SR Books. ISBN 978-0-8420-2578-2.

Political offices
Preceded by Daniel Ortega	President of Nicaragua; 1990–1997	Succeeded by Arnoldo Alemán
