= Chamorro (family) =

Nicaraguan family

The Chamorro family has its origin in Spain. A branch of the family became prominent in Nicaragua in the 18th century and its influence continues to the present. Historically, the Chamorros have been closely associated with the Conservatives, but the Sandinista Revolution has divided their loyalties, with some members supporting the Sandinistas. Outstanding members of this family are:

Josefa Peréz	Pedro Jose Chamorro Argüello	Josefa Margarita Alfaro Monterroso
President; Fruto Chamorro Pérez	Dionisio Chamorro Alfaro	Mercedes Oreamuno	President; Pedro Joaquín Chamorro Alfaro	Maria de la Luz Bolaños Bendana	General; Fernando Chamorro Alfaro
Gregoria Vargas Báez	Salvador Chamorro	President; Rosendo Chamorro Oreamuno
President; Emiliano Chamorro Vargas
Bertha Benard Vivas	Filadelfo Chamorro Bolaños	Dolores Bolaños Chamorro	President; Diego Manuel Chamorro Bolaños	Pedro Joaquin Chamorro Bolaños	Ana María Zelaya Bolaños
Lola Coronel Urtecho	Julio Chamorro Benard	Fernando Chamorro Chamorro	Mercedes Chamorro Bolaños	Margarita Cardenal Argüello	Pedro Joaquín Chamorro Zelaya
Edgar Chamorro Coronel	Blanca Rappaccioli Asenjo	Edmundo Chamorro Chamorro	Jaime Chamorro Cardenal	Hilda de Chamorro Argenal	Pedro Joaquín Chamorro Cardenal	President; Violeta Barrios de Chamorro	Xavier Chamorro Cardenal
Fernando Chamorro Rappaccioli	Pedro Joaquín Chamorro Barrios	Claudia Lucía Chamorro Barríos	Cristiana Chamorro Barrios	Carlos Fernando Chamorro Barríos

== External source errors ==
- Pedro Joaquín Chamorro Alfaro is incorrectly listed as Pedro Joaquín Chamorro Bolaños in the following sources:
  - DATOS HISTORICOS
  - Familia Chamorro
- MSN - ENCARTA
- Pedro Joaquín Chamorro Bolaños is incorrectly listed as Pedro José Chamorro Bolaños in the following source:
  - 3 Conquistador and Colonial Elites of Central America
