= Pedro Joaquín Chamorro Cardenal =

Nicaraguan journalist (1924–1978)

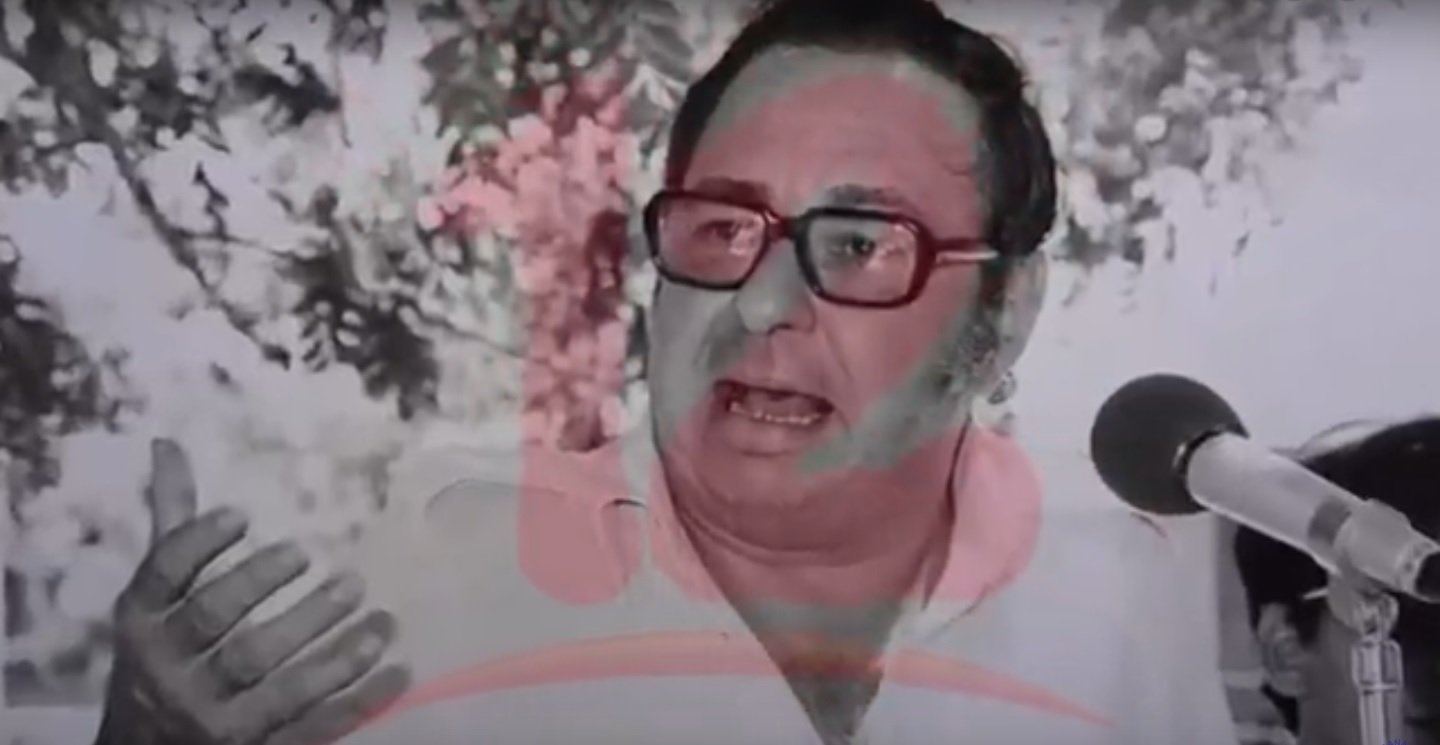
- Born: 23 September 1924; Granada, Nicaragua
- Died: 10 January 1978 (aged 53); Managua, Nicaragua
- Cause of death: Gunshot
- Notable credit: La Prensa
- Spouse: Violeta Barrios Torres
- Children: Pedro Joaquín Chamorro Barrios; Claudia Chamorro Barrios; Cristiana Chamorro Barrios; Carlos Fernando Chamorro Barrios

Pedro Joaquín Chamorro Cardenal (23 September 1924 – 10 January 1978) was a Nicaraguan journalist and publisher. He was the editor of La Prensa, the only significant opposition newspaper to the long rule of the Somoza family. He was a 1977 laureate of the Maria Moors Cabot Prize of Columbia University in New York. He married Violeta Barrios de Chamorro, who later went on to become President of Nicaragua (1990–1997). In 1978, he was shot to death, one of the precipitating events of the overthrow of the Somoza regime the following year.

== Background ==
Chamorro was a son of Pedro Joaquín Chamorro Zelaya and wife, Margarita Cardenal Argüello. He was the paternal grandson of Pedro Joaquín Chamorro Bolaños and wife, Ana María Zelaya Bolaños. He was the maternal grandson of Salvador Cardenal Saborío (son of Pedro Cardenal Ayerdi and wife, Ana María Saborío Bonilla), and wife Isabel Argüello Prado (daughter of Pedro Argüello Argüello and wife Leocadia Parado y Méndez). Both were relatives of Leonardo Argüello, 66th President of Nicaragua. His great-grandparents were Pedro Joaquín Chamorro Alfaro, 39th President of Nicaragua, and his wife, María de la Luz Bolaños Bendaña.

He had two brothers, Jaime and Xavier, and two sisters, Ligia and Ana María.

== Assassination and legacy ==
Chamorro wrote a letter in 1975 to Somoza: "I am waiting, with a clear conscience, and a soul at peace, for the blow you are to deliver." Three years later, in January 1978, Chamorro was killed by unknown gunmen who pulled up beside him in a car and opened fire with shotguns. Somoza claimed Chamorro was assassinated by Pedro Ramos, a Cuban-American entrepreneur whose business had been attacked by La Prensa. At the time, however, the Chamorro family and the wealthy opposition held that Somoza had ordered him killed. Ramos took refuge in Miami, where he died. He was tried in absentia and found guilty of murder after the revolution, but he never returned to Nicaragua. At his funeral, thousands of people followed the coffin from Managua's Oriental Hospital to the Chamorro family home, taking turns carrying it.

Following Chamorro's murder, an estimated 30,000 people rioted in the streets of Managua. Cars were set on fire and several buildings belonging to the Somoza family were attacked. A general strike was called. Outside the capital, unrest broke out in a number of cities and towns, particularly in areas where National Guardsmen had massacred peasant farmers during the counterinsurgency effort. The government responded with further violence and reintroduced martial law censorship. During 1978, there were seven machine gun attacks and attempted bombings of La Prensa, now under the management of Chamorro's widow, Violeta Barrios de Chamorro. Following Somoza's overthrow, she was a part of the FSLN-based junta from 1979 to 1980. She later broke with the FSLN and was elected president of Nicaragua in 1990.

Speaking about her husband to the participants of the 1998 IPI World Congress in Moscow, Violeta Barrios de Chamorro said: "During his whole life, Pedro Joaquín Chamorro was a tireless fighter for democracy in Nicaragua and against the dictatorship of Somoza. This cost him incarceration, torture, exile and finally death. He was warned many times that plans existed to assassinate him, yet no threat detained him from fulfilling his mission to impart the truth and preach democracy."

They had four children:

- Claudia Lucía Chamorro Barrios, married to Edmundo Jarquín, a relative of Carlos Alberto Brenes, 64th President of Nicaragua. Claudia was a Sandinista activist and ambassador to Cuba and Costa Rica in the 1980s. She and her family moved to the United States in 1991 to seek medical care when one of her sons was diagnosed with leukemia.
- Cristiana Chamorro Barrios, married to Antonio Lacayo, leading minister in President Chamorro Barrios' cabinet, and later a candidate for the Presidency. She became editor of La Prensa.
- Pedro Joaquín Chamorro Barrios, married to Martha Lucía Urcuyo. He was a journalist and later a politician, and ran for mayor of Nicaragua's capital city of Managua. He was also a Contra leader who spent time in exile in Costa Rica, while his sister Claudia was ambassador on behalf of the FSLN government.
- Carlos Fernando Chamorro, head of the official newspaper of the Sandinista Government, Barricada, and later a women's rights activist and independent investigative journalist. Chamorro was fired from Barricada by the FSLN in 1994 for refusing to bow to party censorship.

In 2000 he was named one of International Press Institute's 50 World Press Freedom Heroes of the past fifty years.

== "Bloody Lineage: The Somozas" ("Estirpe Sangrienta: Los Somoza") ==
In 1957, "Bloody Lineage: The Somozas" was published by Pedro Joaquín Chamorro Cardenal in which he provides a detailed examination of the Somoza family's rule in Nicaragua. The book is regarded as an important source for understanding the political landscape of the time and the dynamics of power in the country. In this book, Chamorro recounts his experiences, including periods of imprisonment and conflict, to provide context to the regime's impact on society. The book combines personal narrative with historical analysis, highlighting the era's political challenges and social conditions while reflecting on themes of institutional governance, civil rights, and the pursuit of justice, contributing to discussions on Nicaragua's political history and aspirations for reform.

== See also ==
- Chamorro (family)
