= Barricada (FSLN) =

Official publication of FSLN

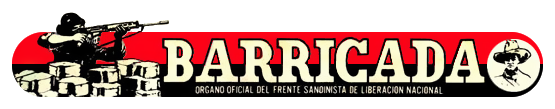
Logo of the former newspaper Barricada

Barricada (1979–1998) was an official publication of FSLN during the Sandinista revolutionary period. The first issue was published on 26 July 1979 and its stated goal was to promote the revolutionary project of the revolutionary regime. In the early days "Barricada" was a competitor with "El Nuevo Diario" and La Prensa.

The first international editor of the paper was Sofía Montenegro, who had a tempestuous relationship with the paper, leaving after a breakdown, returning, being fired for criticizing the Party and finally being asked to return as editor of the editorial page in 1984. Motivated by the escalation of protests against Daniel Ortega in 2018, supporters of Ortega created a new online publication called Barricada, reusing the name of the original FSLN publication.
