= Cristiana Chamorro Barrios =

Nicaraguan journalist

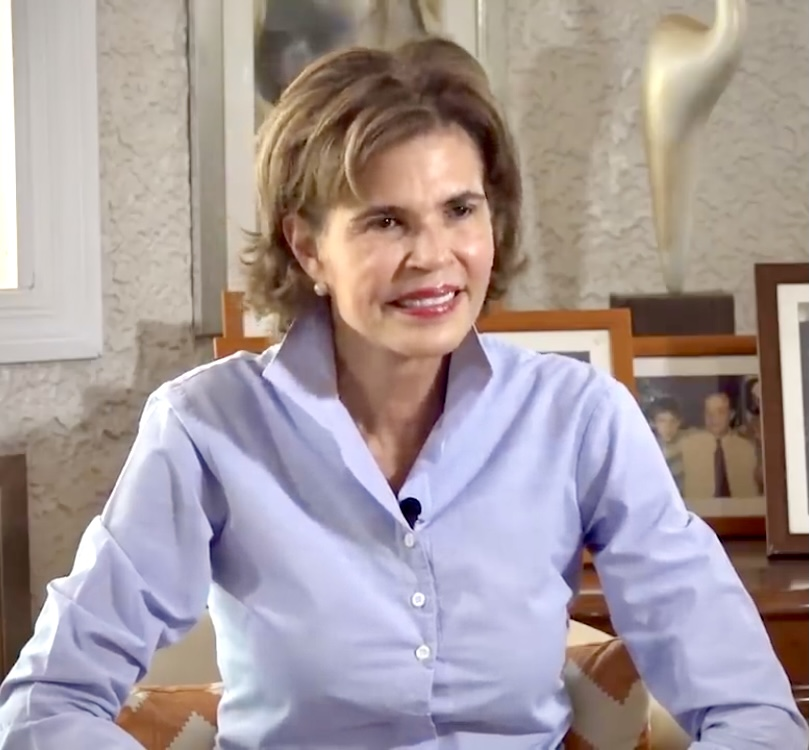
- Chamorro in 2021

First Lady of Nicaragua
- In office 25 April 1990 – 10 January 1997
- President: Violeta Chamorro
- Preceded by: Rosario Murillo
- Succeeded by: María Dolores Alemán Cardinel

Personal details
- Born: 25 February 1954 (age 72) Managua
- Spouse: Antonio Lacayo
- Parents: Pedro Joaquín Chamorro Cardenal (father); Violeta Barrios de Chamorro (mother)
- Relatives: Chamorro family
- Occupation: Journalist

Cristiana Chamorro Barrios (born 25 February 1954) is a Nicaraguan journalist, nonprofit executive and political candidate. Vice-president of La Prensa, she was an aspiring presidential candidate in the 2021 Nicaraguan general election until the government of Daniel Ortega disqualified her from running and ordered her arrest in early June 2021.

Chamorro is the daughter of newspaper editor Pedro Joaquín Chamorro Cardenal, who was assassinated in 1978, and Violeta Barrios de Chamorro, who became president of Nicaragua in 1990. Cristiana began working at La Prensa following her father's death and served as its editor from 1987 to 1991. She also served in the role of First Lady of Nicaragua during her mother's presidency. She later became director of a press freedom foundation honoring her mother, the Violeta Barrios de Chamorro Foundation, until new legal restrictions on civic organizations in Nicaragua forced the closure of the foundation in 2021.

== Career ==
=== La Prensa ===
Chamorro is the daughter of assassinated newspaper editor Pedro Joaquín Chamorro Cardenal and former Nicaraguan president Violeta Barrios de Chamorro. Her father, a critic of the Somoza regime, was murdered in 1978, turning the tide of support against the dictatorship which fell to the Sandinista National Liberation Front the following year. Cristiana joined her mother in working at his paper, La Prensa, and by 35 was editor of the paper. She served in the role from January 1987 to April 1991.

She supported her mother's 1989 campaign for the presidency, but once her mother took office (having defeated incumbent Sandinista Daniel Ortega), the paper, historically an opposition outlet (opposing both the Somoza regime and, eventually, the Sandinistas that had overthrown the dictatorship), came to be seen as a government mouthpiece. Readership declined and by the winter of 1990 Violeta decided to cede her role as publisher and give her shares in the paper to Cristiana. However her late father's relatives, who controlled 60 percent of the paper, were unhappy about this and tried to force out Cristiana for political reasons; her husband Antonio Lacayo was a major figure in her mother's administration and more friendly to the just-defeated Sandinista National Liberation Front than the other side of the family wanted, and they felt the paper had followed this tendency. As a compromise Cristiana Chamorro became chair of the board and anti-FSLN editor Horacio Ruiz became executive editor. Their relationship became acrimonious to the point of no longer speaking, and Chamorro's brother Pedro Joaquín Chamorro Barrios soon replaced Ruiz, although she also had disagreements with her brother, who had been a Contra.

As of 2021, Chamorro is vice-president of the paper, Nicaragua's largest.

=== Violeta Barrios de Chamorro Foundation ===
Chamorro also became director of the press freedom foundation in her mother's name, the Violeta Barrios de Chamorro Foundation (FVBdC). She served in this capacity until January 2021, and in February 2021 the Foundation ceased operations after the Ortega government, which had returned to power in 2007, announced a new law that all groups receiving funding from outside Nicaragua would be required to register as foreign agents. Rather than accept foreign status, the Foundation shut down.

=== Politics ===
Prior to being put under house arrest, Chamorro was a pre-candidate for president of Nicaragua, supporting a unified opposition ticket to challenge incumbent Daniel Ortega, who was running for a fifth term. In May, the Ortega regime opened an investigation into Chamorro's work at the Foundation, alleging money laundering, which threatened to disqualify her candidacy as people under investigation are barred from running. This followed on Nicaragua's Supreme Electoral Council's revocation of the legal status of opposition party the Democratic Restoration Party (PRD). The day Chamorro was called in for questioning, the police also raided the news offices of her brother Carlos's media channel, Confidencial, confiscating equipment and arresting a cameraman. Chamorro subsequently announced she would join the primary, alongside seven other candidates, for the Citizens for Freedom (CxL) party, the only remaining opposition party legally qualified to field a candidate in the November 2021 election. The Ortega government then announced she was disqualified from running and on 2 June raided her house and detained her 15 minutes before she was scheduled to give a press conference, ultimately placing her on house arrest indefinitely and without access to a lawyer. The Secretary General for the Organization of American States, Luis Almagro, criticized the arrest, issuing a statement saying: "Actions like this remove all political credibility from the government and the organizers of the electoral process." Chamorro has been living in exile in the United States since February 9, 2023, when she was unexpectedly removed from her house and boarded onto a plane along with 221 other political prisoners.

== Personal life ==
Chamorro was married to Antonio Lacayo, from 1978 until his death in a helicopter crash in 2015.

== See also ==
- Chamorro family
