= Xavier Chamorro Cardenal =

Nicaraguan newspaper editor

- Born: 31 December 1932; Granada, Nicaragua
- Died: 4 January 2008 (aged 75); Managua
- Occupation: Editor
- Family: Chamorro

Xavier Chamorro Cardenal (31 December 1932 – 4 January 2008) was a Nicaraguan journalist. He began his career working at his father's newspaper, La Prensa, and in 1980 became founding editor and publisher of El Nuevo Diario, a competitor newspaper.

== Background ==
Chamorro Cardenal was born in Granada, Nicaragua, a son of Pedro Joaquín Chamorro Zelaya and his wife Margarita Cardenal Argüello. Chamorro's great-grandfather was Pedro Joaquín Chamorro Alfaro, 39th President of Nicaragua. He was also a relative of Leonardo Argüello. Xavier had two brothers, Jaime and Pedro Joaquín, who succeeded their father as publisher of La Prensa newspaper. They had two sisters, Ligia and Ana María.

== Career ==
Prior to 1980, Chamorro Cardenal had worked with La Prensa, a well-known Conservative publication. It had published criticism of the government. After his brother and editor Pedro Joaquín was assassinated in 1978 by alleged forces of Anastasio Somoza Debayle, Xavier took over as editor of the paper.

In 1980, he left La Prensa, taking eighty percent of the staff with him, as they favored the Sandinistas. Together, they founded El Nuevo Diario, with Chamorro Cardenal as director and editor. The newspaper provided a different political view from that of La Prensa. The paper shut down in 2019.

== Personal life ==
Xavier Chamorro Cardenal married Sonia García Cordova. They had five children together: Francisco Xavier, Margarita, Gabriel, Ana María, and Juan Sebastián.

He also was a professional engineer and an amateur radio operator.

Chamorro Cardenal died in Managua on 4 January 2008, reportedly of heart disease.

== See also ==
- Chamorro family
