= El Nuevo Diario =

Nicaraguan newspaper

- Type: Daily newspaper
- Founded: 1980
- Ceased publication: 27 September 2019
- Headquarters: Managua
- Circulation: 50,000 (2010)

El Nuevo Diario was a Nicaraguan newspaper, with offices in the capital Managua.

== History ==
In 1980, the owner of La Prensa fired the editor Xavier Chamorro Cardenal. Eighty percent of the paper's employees left with Chamorro Cardenal due to La Prensa's increasingly anti-Sandinista line and founded El Nuevo Diario.

From 2010 to 2019, El Nuevo Diario was one of the two major newspapers in Nicaragua (the other one being La Prensa).

El Nuevo Diario suspended its physical printing and digital editions on 27 September 2019.
