= La Prensa (Managua) =

Nicaraguan newspaper

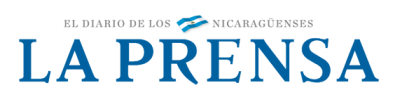
- Type: Daily newspaper
- Founded: 1926
- Headquarters: Managua
- Circulation: 42,000 (pre-2021)
- Website: www.laprensani.com

La Prensa is a Nicaraguan newspaper, with offices in the capital Managua. Its current daily circulation is placed at 42,000. Founded in 1926, in 1932 it was bought by Pedro Joaquín Chamorro Zelaya, who had become editor-in-chief. He promoted the Conservative Party of Nicaragua and became a voice of opposition to Juan Bautista Sacasa, for which the paper was censored. He continued to be critical of dictator Anastasio Somoza García, who came to power in a coup d'état.

Twice the newspaper suffered the destruction of its building in earthquakes, in 1931 and 1972. Forces of Somoza attacked the newspaper's offices in 1953 and 1956, and its work was repeatedly censored.

After Chamorro Zelaya died in 1952, his eldest son Pedro Joaquín Chamorro Cardenal succeeded him as editor-in-chief and a voice of opposition. He opposed the excesses of the Somoza regime and came into conflict for his criticism of the regime, including after 1956 when the son Luis Somoza Debayle succeeded his father.

== History ==
=== Early years ===
La Prensa was founded by Pedro Belli, Gavry Rivas and Enrique Belli on March 2, 1926. In 1930, Pedro Joaquín Chamorro Zelaya became editor-in-chief, and in 1932 he bought the paper with the intention of promoting the principles of the Conservative Party of Nicaragua, as well as publicising historical studies of Nicaragua. In 1931 the office building that housed La Prensa was destroyed, for the first time out of many, in an earthquake that hit Managua. La Prensa suffered its first censorship in 1934 under the orders of Juan Bautista Sacasa, for being overly critical of the government. This began a long history of censorship under many different governments.

In 1936 Anastasio Somoza García, who came to power through a coup d'état, began his own censorship of the paper. Threats against La Prensa for their anti-Somocista stance became customary. In 1945, under the guise of national security, the government ordered La Prensa to completely shut down for an indefinite amount of time.

=== Pedro Joaquín Chamorro Cardenal ===
In 1952, after the death of Pedro Joaquín Chamorro, his eldest son, Pedro Joaquín Chamorro Cardenal, became the new editor of La Prensa. He is credited with improving the newspaper's fortunes. Chamorro Cardenal also increased the anti-Somoza rhetoric of his editorials, placing La Prensa at greater risk from the Somoza regime. Somoza subsequently increased his pressure on the editors of La Prensa. On May 22, 1953, one of Somoza's cronies, General Andrès Murillo, sent Somocista mobs to assault the newspaper's new building in Managua. Chamorro Cardenal was arrested, sent to military court, imprisoned and allegedly tortured for several months before being released.

In 1956, Anastasio Somoza García was assassinated and his son Luis Somoza Debayle succeeded him to power. Like his father, Somoza Debayle had little tolerance for the strong criticism against his regime that was mounted by La Prensa, which claimed to have argued for responsible government, participatory democracy, and neoliberal economic policies. That year, La Prensa was again occupied by Somoza's forces, and Chamorro Cardenal was charged with aiding the conspirators who had killed Debayle's father. He was subsequently jailed and forced to publish condolences to the late dictator Somoza. La Prensa was henceforth subjected to prolonged censorship by the regime.

In 1959, Chamorro Cardenal went to Havana, Cuba, to meet with the new revolutionary leader, Fidel Castro, in order to bargain a deal for arms and munitions. After prolonged negotiations, disagreements between the two men resulted in no deal being achieved. But, by May of that year, Chamorro had gathered enough capital and weapons to land 120 men, including himself, in the provinces of Boaco and Chontales, in an attempt to overthrow Somoza Debayle. The invasion failed, which was known as the so-called Guerrilla de Olama y Mollejones, and Chamorro was captured. He was convicted and sentenced to several years in prison.

In 1963, La Prensa was praised for launching a literacy campaign, a concept that was later adopted by the Salvadoran FSLN. With modest tools, La Prensa caused a nationwide sensation by publishing over 100,000 primers that were the backbone of the National Literacy Campaign. They circulated maps of Nicaragua to millions who had never had the opportunity the study one in school. The program was distributed by UNESCO to local "teachers". Notably, future Sandinistas such as Ernesto Cardenal, Sergio Ramirez, Gioconda Belli Murillo, and Carlos Mejía Godoy all contributed to the campaign. But that year Somoza ordered the dissolution of the Patriotic Literacy Campaign's National Committee.

On December 23, 1972, the headquarters of La Prensa was destroyed in the massive earthquake that leveled most of Managua. Chamorro rebuilt the newspaper's offices on the "North Highway" and it reopened in March 1973.

During the next years, resistance rose against Somoza in numerous quarters of Nicaragua. La Prensa continued to be a voice of opposition even as several radio talk shows and media outlets were being shut down by the government. In August 1978, Chamorro loaned 50,000 Cordobas from the newspaper to a Sandinista operation, which was never repaid.

On the morning of January 10, 1978, Chamorro was blocked on his way to work by a green Toyota. He was shot by several rounds from a shotgun and died in an ambulance on the way to a nearby hospital. It is widely believed in Nicaragua that Somoza's son, "El Chigüin", was behind the murder. Chamorro became a martyr, and his assassination helped ignite widespread opposition to the Somoza government. Many of the middle and upper classes supported the Sandinista insurgency after his murder. His assassination was a catalyst for the beginning of the final mass insurrection against Somoza.

As Somoza went into exile from Nicaragua, he ordered a final destruction of La Prensa by his Guardsmen, who used kerosene to light the building on fire. La Prensa was rebuilt within months.

=== The Sandinistas ===
After the fall of the government, Chamorro's widow, Violeta, served on the five-member Junta of National Reconstruction. However, Chamorro and the middle-class supporters of the revolution had a different vision for the country than the Sandinistas. When it became apparent that these differences could not be resolved, Violeta Chamorro resigned from the junta in 1980 and began to oppose the Sandinistas.

According to Noam Chomsky, the post-1980 version of La Prensa bears virtually no relation to the paper which opposed Somoza. In 1980, the owner of La Prensa fired the editor Xavier Chamorro Cardenal. Eighty percent of the papers employees left with Chamorro Cardenal due to La Prensa's increasingly anti-Sandinista line and founded El Nuevo Diario.

Soon after the Junta passed new laws, freedom of the press became subject to many political criteria. On July 22, 1979, the Law of National Emergency allowed all media in Nicaragua to be placed under government control. On September 10, 1980, decrees 511 and 512 established prior censorship for matters of national security.

In this period the US, with the support of La Prensa, started its campaign against the Sandinista government, by giving secret financial and arms support to the Contras. In this struggle under the Sandinistas, La Prensa was also often accused of being a puppet of the CIA. The staff were accused of being Contra sympathizers and thus, "vende-patrias" (‘motherland-sellers’) or traitors to the motherland. The paper admitted receiving funds from the National Endowment for Democracy, a bipartisan, Congressionally financed agency created to take over financing of groups that in the past had received covert aid from the CIA. But La Prensa staff claimed that this funding was publicly declared and legal.

On March 15, 1982, the government declared a state of emergency, and closed down all independent broadcast new programs. Sandinista censorship began clamping down on political dissent and criticism. That same year La Prensa was occupied three times by Sandinista forces, and it was constantly surrounded by Sandinista mobs. Under the FSLN this pattern of hostility continued throughout the years of Sandinista rule. During the 1980s, La Prensa received extensive subventions from the United States National Endowment for Democracy. La Prensa staff members wrote articles in The Washington Post and other major US papers denouncing the Sandinistas and asking for aid for the Contras.

La Prensa's strident criticism of Sandinista policies, particularly its economic policies, and its attacks on FSLN leader Daniel Ortega allegedly led the Sandinistas to adopt various restrictions on press freedom. La Prensa editors claimed that they were harassed by state security and that it was sometimes censored or closed, although it had a significantly higher circulation than the Sandinista "Barricade" (70 thousand copies against 45 in 1986). The restrictions were lifted in a deal between Ortega and his opponents in the run-up to the 1990 election.

In Necessary Illusions, Noam Chomsky wrote that, La Prensa "made little effort to disguise its role as an agency of US propaganda, dedicated to overthrowing the government of Nicaragua by force".

In April 2018 La Prensa began criticizing the Ortega government. Following its series of articles about human rights violations in October and November of that year, the government imposed a blockade of paper, ink, and other printing supplies. News media Confidencial and 100% Noticias were looted and confiscated, journalists Miguel Mora and Lucía Pineda Ubau were arrested, and the work of 68 exiled reporters was disrupted. Negotiations in March 2019 led to a promise to lift the blockade in October 2019, but the government did not keep its promise. The blockade was not lifted until February 2020, after 75 weeks, but the newspaper must still pay off its debts before receiving the material it needs in order to operate.

On August 12, 2021, La Prensa suspended its physical print edition, claiming the government refused to release newsprint imports. State-run media disputed the claim. On August 13, riot police raided the headquarters of La Prensa, reportedly cutting internet and electricity before removing boxes of material. Police stated they were investigating customs fraud and money laundering by the paper's managers and confiscated printing paper before allowing workers to return to the building with continued supervision. Media and opposition groups assert the raid against La Prensa is politically-motivated, as it comes before the 2021 Nicaraguan general election, which has seen Ortega's government bar opposition candidates such as former La Prensa editor Cristiana Chamorro Barrios. The general manager, Juan Lorenzo Holmann, was arrested in 2021; its editors fled the country in 2022 after two drivers were arrested and staff homes were threatened. La Prensa was the last remaining print newspaper in Nicaragua since the 2019 shutdown of fellow opposition paper El Nuevo Diario over a similar block of physical supplies by the Ortega government.

In May 2025, La Prensa was awarded UNESCO/Guillermo Cano World Press Freedom Prize. In response, Nicaraguan authorities announced the withdrawal of the country from UNESCO: Nicaraguan Minister of Foreign Affairs Valdrack Jaentschke claimed that La Prensa is a pro-U.S. media and “represents the vile betrayal against our Motherland.”

== Current positions ==
La Prensa generally supports neoliberal economics and is largely aligned with the United States government. It is generally conservative on social issues, and identifies closely with the Catholic Church (its cancellation of a weekly column written by Church theologians sparked a minor controversy). However, the paper has attacked ex-President and PLC Leader Arnoldo Alemán for corruption, opposed the political agreement between Alemán and Daniel Ortega, and challenged the perceived weak government of conservative President Enrique Bolaños. It also challenged the outspoken comments of the former U.S. ambassador Paul Trivelli regarding Nicaraguan affairs.

== See also ==
- El Nuevo Diario
- Freedom of the press in Nicaragua
- Chamorro family
