= 2016 Nicaraguan general election =

- 6 November 2016
- Presidential election
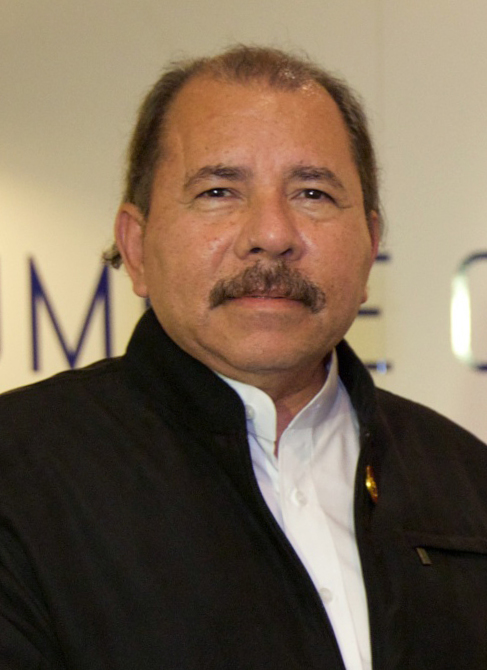

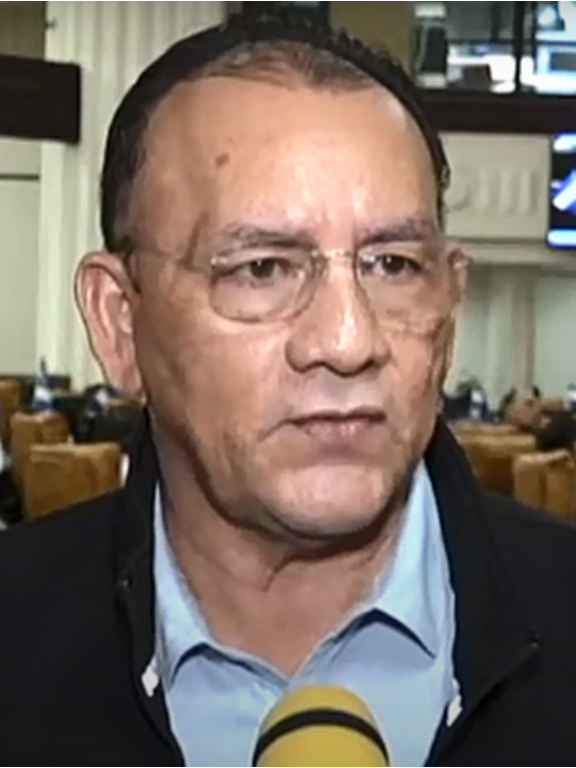
Candidate	Daniel Ortega	Maximino Rodríguez
Party	FSLN	PLC
Running mate	Rosario Murillo	Martha McCoy
Popular vote	1,806,651	374,898
Percentage	72.44%	15.03%
- Results by department Ortega : 50–60% 60–70% 70–80% 80–90%
President before election
Daniel Ortega
FSLN
Elected President
Daniel Ortega
FSLN
- Parliamentary election
- 90 seats in the National Assembly; 46 seats needed for a majority
Party	Leader	Vote %	Seats	+/–
FSLN	Daniel Ortega	65.86	70	+8
PLC	Maximino Rodríguez	15.30	13	+11
PLI	José Alvarado	6.71	2	−24
ALN	Saturnino Cerrato	5.70	2	+2
Conservative	Erick Cabezas	4.39	1	+1
APRE	Carlos Canales	2.04	1	+1
YATAMA	Brooklyn Rivera	–	1	+1
This lists parties that won seats. See the complete results below.
Results by constituency
President of the National Assembly before	President of the National Assembly after
Iris Montenegro Blandón; FSLN	Gustavo Porras Cortés; FSLN

General elections were held in Nicaragua on 6 November 2016 to elect the President, the National Assembly and members of the Central American Parliament. Incumbent President Daniel Ortega of the Sandinista National Liberation Front (FSLN) was re-elected for a third consecutive term amid charges he and the FSLN used their control of state resources to bypass constitutional term limits and hamstring political rivals. The FSLN benefited from strong economic growth and relatively low levels of crime compared to neighbouring countries.

According to the official results, Ortega was reelected with more than 70% of the votes. However, the election was questioned by the opposition due to the dismissal of sixteen opposition deputies months prior to the election and the complaints of both electoral fraud and voter intimidation.

== Background ==
Four months before the elections, the Nicaraguan Supreme Court removed the disputed Independent Liberal Party (PLI) leader Eduardo Montealegre from office, decreeing that Pedro Reyes was the leader of the PLI. After 16 deputies from the PLI and its Sandinista Renovation Movement ally objected, the Supreme Electoral Council ordered them removed from the National Assembly and empowered Reyes to select their replacements.

== Electoral system ==
The president was elected using first-past-the-post voting.

The 90 elected members of the National Assembly were elected by two methods; 20 members were elected from a single nationwide constituency, whilst 70 members were elected from 17 multi-member constituencies ranging in size from 2 to 19 seats. Both types of election were carried out using closed list proportional representation with no electoral threshold. A further two seats were reserved for the runner-up in the presidential election and the outgoing president (or their vice president).

Lists of candidates to the National Assembly and to the Central American Parliament had to be composed of 50% male and 50% female candidates.

== Conduct ==
In June 2016 Ortega announced international observers would not be allowed to oversee the elections. The Carter Center termed this "an attack on the international community... We...lament this decision to ignore a key portion of Nicaragua's own electoral law." However, less than two weeks before the elections, the Organization of American States accepted an invitation to send a delegation "to meet with experts and state bodies involved in the electoral process" from 5–7 November.

According to the official results, Ortega was reelected with more than 70% of the votes. However, the election was questioned by the opposition due to the dismissal of the opposition deputies, the lack of international observers and the complaints of both electoral fraud and voter intimidation.

== Results ==
=== President ===
Ortega was widely expected to win due to the popularity of his social programmes and because he faced no obvious political challenger.

Candidate	Running mate	Party	Votes	%
Daniel Ortega	Rosario Murillo	Sandinista National Liberation Front	1,806,651	72.44
Maximino Rodríguez	Martha McCoy	Constitutionalist Liberal Party	374,898	15.03
Pedro Reyes	Yadira Ríos	Independent Liberal Party	112,562	4.51
Saturnino Cerrato	Francisca Chow	Nicaraguan Liberal Alliance	107,392	4.31
Erick Cabezas	Sandra Montoya	Conservative Party	57,437	2.30
Carlos Canales	Nilo Salazar	Alliance for the Republic	35,002	1.40
Total			2,493,942	100.00

=== National Assembly ===
Party	National			Departmental			Total seats	+/–
Party	Votes	%	Seats	Votes	%	Seats	Total seats	+/–
Sandinista National Liberation Front	1,590,316	65.86	14	1,608,395	65.62	56	70	+8
Constitutionalist Liberal Party	369,342	15.30	3	375,432	15.32	10	13	+11
Independent Liberal Party	162,043	6.71	1	117,626	4.80	1	2	–24
Nicaraguan Liberal Alliance	137,541	5.70	1	137,078	5.59	1	2	+2
Conservative Party	106,027	4.39	1	110,568	4.51	0	1	+1
Alliance for the Republic	49,329	2.04	0	70,939	2.89	1	1	+1
YATAMA				30,901	1.26	1	1	+1
Special members (Note: The runner-up in the presidential election (Maximino Rodríguez of the Constitutionalist Liberal Party) and the outgoing president are special members of the National Assembly; as Ortega was re-elected, outgoing Vice President Omar Halleslevens of the FSLN, who was not Ortega's running mate in these elections (having been replaced by Rosario Murillo), will take up his seat.)							2	–
Total	2,414,598	100.00	20	2,450,939	100.00	70	92	0

==== List of elected deputies ====
Name	Party	Constituency
Adilia del Pilar Salinas Ortega	PLC	Chontales
Alba Estela González Torrez	FSLN	National
Alejandro Mejía Ferreti	ALN	National
Alfredo César Aguirre	PC	National
Alveris Beldramina Arias Siezar	FSLN	Managua
Ángela Espinoza Torrez	FSLN	Madriz
Antenor Enrique Urbina Leyva	FSLN	Costa Caribe Norte
Argentina del Socorro Parajón Alejos	FSLN	León
Arling Patricia Alonso Gómez	FSLN	Chinandega
Arturo José Valdez Robleto	FSLN	Costa Caribe Sur
Bayardo Antonio Chávez Mendoza	FSLN	Chinandega
Benita del Carmen Arbizú Medina	FSLN	León
Brooklyn Rivera Bryan	YATAMA	Costa Caribe Norte
Byron Rodolfo Jérez Solís	APRE	Managua
Carlos Alberto Jirón Bolaños	PLC	León
Carlos Emilio López Hurtado	FSLN	Managua
Carlos Wilfredo Navarro Moreira	FSLN	National
Corina González García	FSLN	Chontales
Delia María Law Blanco	FSLN	Granada
Dora Elena Rojas	FSLN	Chinandega
Douglas Alemán Benavídez	FSLN	Chontales
Edwin Ramón Castro Rivera	FSLN	Managua
Efrén José González Briones	FSLN	Madriz
Enrique Aldana Burgos	FSLN	Matagalpa
Enrique Javier Beteta Acevedo	FSLN	National
Evelin Patricia Aburto Torres	FSLN	Masaya
Félix Andrés Sandoval Jarquín	FSLN	Chinandega
Filiberto Jacinto Rodríguez López	FSLN	León
Florence Ivette Levy Wilson	FSLN	National
Giorgia Hilaria Juárez Cruz	FSLN	Chinandega
Gladis de los Ángeles Báez	FSLN	León
Gloria del Rosario Montenegro	FSLN	Jinotega
Guillermo Eduardo Arce Castaño	FSLN	Managua
Gustavo Eduardo Porras Cortés	FSLN	National
Haydée Azucena Castillo Barquero	PLC	National
Herberto Octavio Ruiz Morales	FSLN	Granada
Iris Marina Montenegro Blandón	FSLN	Managua
Irma de Jesús Dávila Lazo	FSLN	Matagalpa
Jacinto José Suárez Espinoza	FSLN	Managua
Jenny Azucena Martínez Gómez	FSLN	Masaya
Jimmy Harold Blandón Rubio	PLC	Managua
Johanna del Carmen Luna Lira	FSLN	Managua
José Antonio Zepeda López	FSLN	National
José Ramón Sarría Morales	FSLN	León
José Santos Figueroa Aguilar	FSLN	Managua
Josefina Roa Romero	FSLN	Carazo
Juana de los Ángeles Molina	FSLN	National
Juana Vicenta Argeñal Sandoval	FSLN	National
Juan Ramón Jiménez	FSLN	Carazo
Juan Ramón Meza Romero	FSLN	Jinotega
Juan Ramón Obregón Valdivia	FSLN	Jinotega
Justo Armando Peña Avilés	FSLN	Rivas
Laura Estela Bermúdez Robleto	FSLN	National
Lester Adrián Villarreal Pérez	PLC	Masaya
Loria Raquel Dixon Brautigam	FSLN	Costa Caribe Norte
Lucina Leonor Paz Rodríguez	FSLN	Boaco
Luis Coronel Cuadra	FSLN	Río San Juan
María Augustina Montenegro López	FSLN	Matagalpa
María Auxiliadora Martínez Corrales	FSLN	Granada
María Fernanda Ernestina Flores Lanza	PLC	Managua
María Haydée Osuna Ruiz	PLC	National
María Jilma Rosalez Espinoza	FSLN	Estelí
María Manuela Sacasa Selva	FSLN	National
Mario José Asensio Florez	PLI	Managua
Mario Valle Dávila	FSLN	Managua
Maritza del Socorro Espinales	FSLN	Managua
Maryinis Ibet Vallejoz Chavarría	FSLN	Rivas
Mauricio Orúe Vásquez	ALN	Managua
Maximino Rodríguez Martínez (Note: The runner-up in the presidential election (Maximino Rodríguez of the Constitutionalist Liberal Party) and the outgoing president are special members of the National Assembly; as Ortega was re-elected, outgoing Vice President Omar Halleslevens of the FSLN, who was not Ortega's running mate in these elections (having been replaced by Rosario Murillo), will take up his seat.)	PLC	–
Melba del Socorro Sánchez Suárez	FSLN	Managua
Melvin Martín Argucia Perrott	FSLN	Nueva Segovia
Miguel Anselmo Rosales Ortega	PLC	National
Mirta Mercedes Carrión Cano	PLC	Chinandega
Moisés Omar Halleslevens Acevedo	FSLN	–
Nasser Sebastián Silwany Báez	FSLN	Masaya
Odell Ángel Incer Barquero	FSLN	Boaco
Osorno Salomón Coleman	FSLN	National
Patricia Mercedes Sánchez Urbina	FSLN	Managua
Paul Antonio González Tenorio	PLC	Costa Caribe Sur
Pedro Antonio Haslam Mendoza	FSLN	National
Pedro Joaquín Treminio Mendoza	PLI	National
Perla Soledad Castillo Quintero	FSLN	Estelí
Reyna Juanita Rueda Alvarado	FSLN	National
Reynaldo Altamirano Alaniz	PLC	Matagalpa
Rosa Adelina Barahona Castro	FSLN	Matagalpa
Rosa Argentina Navarro Sánchez	PLC	Managua
Rosa Herminia Irias Figueroa	FSLN	Nueva Segovia
Rubén de Jesús Gómez Suárez	FSLN	Matagalpa
Santiago José Martínez Lacayo	FSLN	Carazo
Víctor Octavio Triminio Zavala	FSLN	Estelí
Walmaro Antonio Gutiérrez Mercado	FSLN	National
Walter Edén Espinoza Fernández	PLC	Managua

=== Central American Parliament ===
Party	Votes	%	Seats	+/–
Sandinista National Liberation Front	1,673,627	68.45	15	+2
Constitutionalist Liberal Party	346,855	14.19	3	+2
Independent Liberal Party	139,618	5.71	1	–5
Nicaraguan Liberal Alliance	134,858	5.52	1	+1
Conservative Party	106,350	4.35	0	0
Alliance for the Republic	43,905	1.80	0	0
Total	2,445,213	100.00	20	0
