= Vilma Núñez =

Nicaraguan human rights activist and lawyer

Vilma Núñez de Escorcia
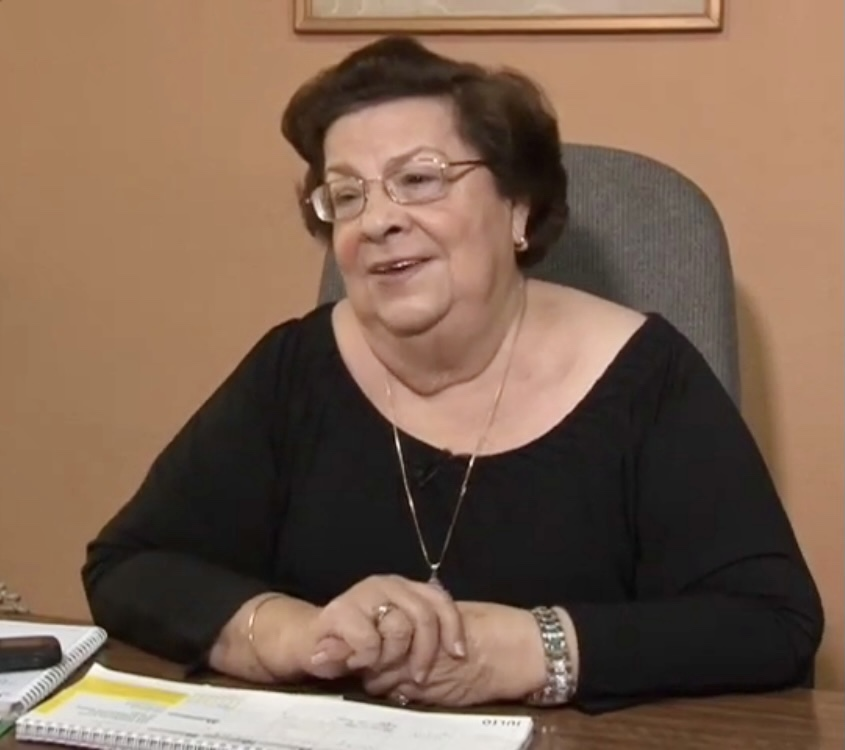
- Núñez in 2016
- Born: 25 November 1938 (age 87)
- Education: National Autonomous University of Nicaragua
- Occupations: Lawyer, human rights activist
- Organization: Nicaraguan Center for Human Rights (CENIDH)
- Website: cenidh.org

Vilma Núñez de Escorcia (née Vilma Núñez Ruiz, 25 November 1938) is a Nicaraguan lawyer and human-rights activist. Born to a single mother, she developed an early concern for social justice. As an undergraduate studying law at National Autonomous University of Nicaragua in León, she met future senior government officials Carlos Tünnerman and Sergio Ramírez, and became one of the survivors of the 23 July 1959 student massacre by the Somoza National Guard. She joined the Sandinista National Liberation Front around 1975 and in 1979 was imprisoned and tortured by the Somoza regime. She was freed days before the FSLN insurrection succeeded on 19 July 1979. When they took power, she served as vice-president of the Supreme Court of Justice, then as director of the National Commission for the Promotion and Protection of Human Rights.

Núñez went on to found the non-governmental organization Nicaraguan Center for Human Rights (CENIDH) in 1990 when the FSLN lost power. In 1996, she unsuccessfully challenged Daniel Ortega to be the party's candidate for President; but in 1998 she broke with the party to represent Zoilamérica Ortega Murillo, Ortega's stepdaughter who accused him of sexually abusing her as a child. Núñez has since faced harassment and in 2008, the Inter-American Court of Human Rights issued precautionary measures to protect her. Following the April 2018 anti-government protests, CENIDH was one of a number of non-profits that had their legal status revoked and its office was raided by police, but Núñez insisted on continuing her human rights work. A new challenge came with the 2020 Law for the Regulation of Foreign Agents, which ordered all groups that receive funding from abroad to register as foreign agents; Núñez is challenging its constitutionality in court.

== Early life ==
Vilma Núñez was born on 25 November 1938 to unmarried parents, causing a series of exclusions in her young life in conservative Nicaragua: she and her mother Tomasa Núñez Ruiz were unwelcome at school, church and social clubs in Acoyapa, Chontales, perhaps also because of the local influence of her father's wife. Her father, Humberto Núñez Sevilla (no blood relation to her mother), was a Conservative Party leader and Somoza critic who was often imprisoned during Núñez's childhood, though he also served as a deputy in parliament during Anastasio Somoza Garcia's rule. His example of political engagement was influential for Vilma, whose first acts of resistance against the Liberal Somoza dictatorship came in the form of support for Conservatives, though she ultimately concluded there was little difference between their ideologies and neither sufficiently addressed social injustice.

Núñez Sevilla died in 1947, leaving an inheritance to Vilma Núñez and two of her siblings, Léon and Indiana, but this again left their mother subordinate, as funds were not bequeathed directly but instead disbursed at a trustee's discretion. These early experiences motivated Núñez's later human rights activism as well as her desire to go to law school, though her mother wanted her to study architecture.

She did not begin school until age eight, and eventually moved to Managua in search of a good secondary school that would accept her, ultimately enrolling at Colegio Madre del Divino Pastor. At 19 she enrolled at the National Autonomous University of Nicaragua (UNAN) in Léon, studying law. There she studied with Carlos Tünnerman, then a young professor, who later became a member of the Group of Twelve leading supporters of the Sandinista (FSLN) rebels and eventually the Minister of Education for the FSLN government.

Whilst at UNAN, Núñez survived the student massacre of 23 July 1959, when the National Guard of Nicaragua fired on a student demonstration, killing four students and two onlookers and injuring almost 100 more people. Sergio Ramírez, later vice-president of Nicaragua, was also a student survivor of the day. It was considered a turning point in the political consciousness of the "Generation of 1959" or the "Generation of July 23" and later commemorated as the national Day of the Nicaraguan Student.

== Career ==
=== Early career and FSLN ===
After graduating, Núñez began working as a litigator, primarily a criminal defense lawyer, and took pro bono cases defending political prisoners held by the Somoza government. Among her clients were campesinos (peasants) fighting to have confiscated land restored to them; only later did they learn it was in fact Sandinistas who had taken the land.

Around 1975 Núñez became involved with the FSLN and on 30 April 1979, she was taken prisoner by the Somoza government; she was freed 11 July, just days before the fall of the regime (19 July). During her five months in prison, Núñez was tortured, including with electric shocks, but did not give up any of what was by that point extensive knowledge of the FSLN networks, for example, Commander Dora María Téllez's operation that successfully captured the city of Léon.

On 20 July, the day after the FSLN prevailed, Núñez was asked to join the Supreme Court, and became a vice-president. In the same period, Núñez also served as vice president of the Nicaraguan Commission for Peace, building international solidarity against the United States embargo then in place; she worked with groups that sent supplies and made work trips to aid Nicaragua. She toured broadly in the US in this role, especially speaking on the Nicaraguan legal system, and also worked with former New York district attorney Reed Brody in gathering information on attacks by the Contras on civilians, published in 1985 as Contra Terror in Nicaragua: Report of a Fact-Finding Mission, September 1984–January 1985.

In 1988, the FSLN appointed Núñez director of the newly formed National Commission for the Promotion and Protection of Human Rights, where she served until 1990. She regarded the transfer as a punishment, since she was the Court's senior vice-president and the presidency was about to become open; being moved to the Human Rights Commission prevented her from assuming the role.

As a member of the FSLN, she found a commitment to gender equality that was more theoretical than lived. Official documents set out formal obligations to equal political participation; "however," she said, "the practice was different." She attributed what limited gender advances were accomplished to the efforts of individual female militants and the Luisa Amanda Espinoza Association of Nicaraguan Women (AMNLAE).

=== Founding CENIDH ===
In 1990, when Violeta Barrios de Chamorro defeated FSLN incumbent Daniel Ortega and assumed the Nicaraguan presidency, Núñez was in Geneva, Switzerland to give a speech. With an assistant, Núñez began discussing the possible creation of a body to monitor the new government, and another activist at the conference encouraged her to start a human rights foundation, donating $2500 to seed the project. This began the Nicaraguan Center for Human Rights (Centro Nicaragüense de Derechos Humanos, or CENIDH), founded on 16 May 1990. This project built upon work and credibility she had developed while working for the FSLN's Commission on Human Rights, where she defended cases that included one of her own former torturers.

CENIDH was granted legal status in September of that year and began its work by focusing on capacity-building with training programs teaching Nicaraguans that access to education and health care were human rights. Later it also started investigating allegations of human rights violations, problems Núñez recalled as developing after conservative Constitutionalist Liberal Party (PLC) President Arnoldo Alemán took office in 1997 (Nicaragua's constitution prevented Chamorro from seeking a second term). Alemán responded by accusing Núñez of being a member of the Andrés Castro United Front (FUAC), a group of demobilized former Sandinista military members who had re-armed despite the peace accords. In fact CENIDH had been sought out to mediate disarmament negotiations and the Attorney General dismissed the allegations against Núñez.

=== Break with the FSLN ===
Until this point Núñez was still a strong supporter of the FSLN, although the party did not contribute to CENIDH (instead it was largely funded by foreign donations). Nevertheless CENIDH supported dissidents protesting the conservative Chamorro and then Alemán governments. When the Sandinista Renovation Movement (MRS) broke away from the FSLN in 1995, Núñez remained loyal. Her relationship became strained when she ran against party leader and former Nicaraguan president Daniel Ortega in 1996 to be the FSLN’s candidate for president, seeking to foster democratic culture within the party. Former comrades began to attack her. The conflict came to a head in 1998 when Zoilamérica Ortega Murillo came forward with allegations that her stepfather Daniel Ortega had raped her as a child. Zoilamérica reported the allegations to CENIDH and the case became a crossroads for Núñez, bringing into direct conflict her political role with the FSLN and her commitment to advocacy for women and human rights. Despite Rosario Murillo's insistence Núñez decline the case (Murillo sided with her husband against her daughter's allegations), Núñez agreed to represent Zoilamérica, sealing Núñez's fate as an enemy of the presidential couple and their supporters. Her house was vandalized and she became subject to death threats.

Núñez continued her work undeterred, bringing and winning major cases before the Inter-American Court of Human Rights. In 2001, she brought a petition for the Yapti Tasba Masraka Nanih Asla Takanka (YATAMA) party representing indigenous people, primarily the Miskito people of the Caribbean Coast, against the Nicaraguan government for excluding them from elections. In 2005 the Court decided in favor of the YATAMA and ordered remedial measures, but as of 2018 the government still had not fully complied. Núñez and CENIDH also joined María Luisa Acosta, a human rights and indigenous and Afro-Caribbean activist, in her case before the Court surrounding the slaying of her husband Francisco García Valle on 8 April 2002, allegedly in retaliation for Acosta's human rights activism and legal representation of communities in the Caribbean coast. The suit against the Nicaraguan government alleged failure to bring justice and to adequately protect Acosta. The Court decided in her favor in 2017, although in this case too the Nicaraguan government has failed to follow through on all the ordered remedies.

In all, Núñez has filed more than 20 cases with the IACHR and documented thousands of allegations of human rights violations; she reports that between 2007 and 2016 (under Daniel Ortega's second presidency), 35% of the allegations (5,584 cases) were against the National Police. Threats against Núñez mounted and in 2008 her home was attacked. That year and renewed annually since, the Inter-American Commission on Human Rights (IACHR) has issued precautionary measures to protect Núñez and her family, although the FSLN government has not complied with these. In 2017, Murillo (by then Nicaragua's Vice-President as well as First Lady) wrote a letter, signed by nine FSLN officials, to the US embassy in protest after Ambassador Lauren Dogu presented Núñez with an award on International Women's Day.

=== Suspension of CENIDH's legal status ===
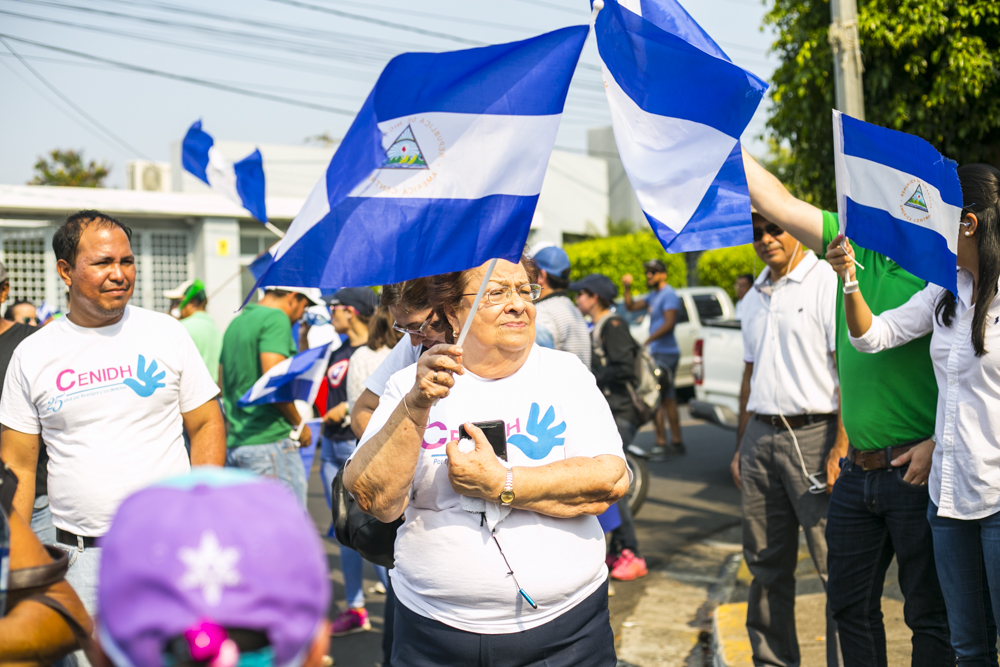
Núñez attends a march during the 2018 Nicaraguan protests

On 12 December 2018, at the request of the FSLN Interior Minister, the FSLN-controlled National Assembly voted to revoke the legal status of CENIDH, accusing the group of using funds to "destabilize the country". Their offices were raided by some 60 police officers and some of their members were forced to go into exile in Costa Rica. Other NGOs and press outlets faced similar repression. This followed on months of anti-government protests, initially begun in April 2018 in opposition to cuts to social security, then massively expanded following a bloody crackdown by the FSLN government. Diverse sectors of Nicaraguan society joined pjotests against the repression, including Núñez who called for President Ortega to step down, while the FSLN government insisted the mass resistance was a foreign-orchestrated coup attempt. Núñez rejected the accusation against CENIDH specifically as well as the protestors in general, and vowed to keep fighting for the rights of Nicaraguans. The IACHR, Amnesty International and the World Center against Torture issued statements of support for CENIDH and concern about repression of human rights by the Nicaraguan government.

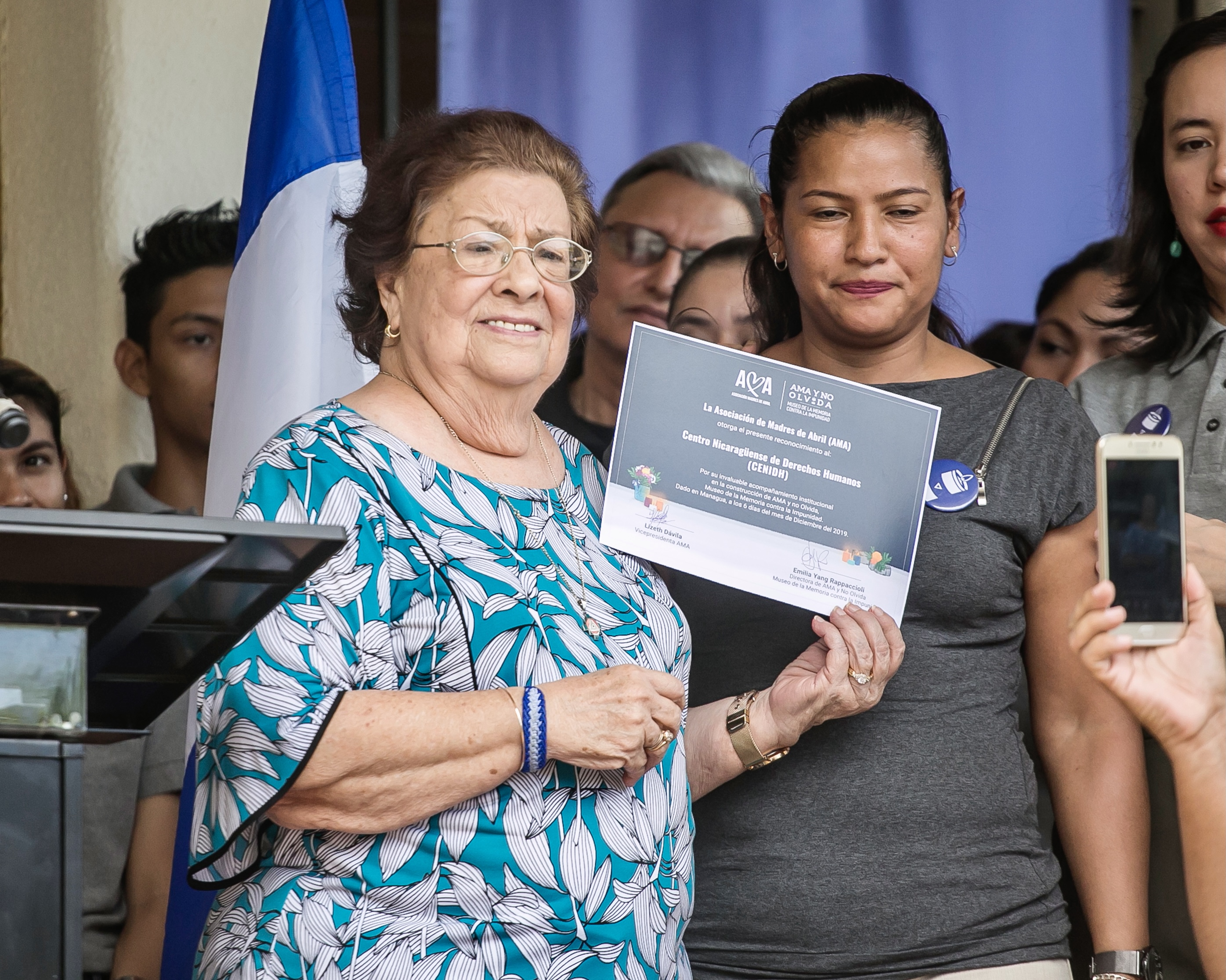
Núñez accepts an award on behalf of CENIDH from the Mothers of April Association in December 2019

While it was now more difficult, Núñez persisted in her human rights advocacy with CENIDH for the next two years until she and other organizations encountered a new hurdle in the form of the Law for the Regulation of Foreign Agents, passed by the National Assembly on 15 October 2020. This required any organization receiving foreign funding to register as a foreign agent. Núñez is contesting the constitutionality of this new requirement, which would subject implicated organizations to possible intervention in their property and assets, as well as threaten their legal status if the government judges that they are intervening in internal politics. More than 60 organizations have filed appeals to the Supreme Court asking that the law be partially repealed. Núñez critiques both the assertion that foreign funding implies representing external interests, as well as the implication of criminality it carries. She said in a 2020 interview: "I'm a Nicaraguan. I was born in Nicaragua, I live in Nicaragua, and I'm going to die in Nicaragua. So, I can't in any way refrain from appealing this law, and I'm not going to register".

=== Loss of citizenship ===
In 2023, Vilma Núñez was stripped of her Nicaraguan citizenship.

== Honors ==
In 2011, Núñez was awarded the Legion of Honor by the French embassy for her human rights work. The same year, Núñez won the Stieg Larsson prize for "her long struggle for women's rights and against the unjust anti-abortion laws of Nicaragua," an honor accompanied by a 200,000 Swedish crowns (about 30,000 USD). In 2019 she won the Bremen International Peace Prize, in the category "Ambassador for peace in public life".

== Personal life ==
On 25 December 1963, Núñez married Otto Escorcia Pastrán, a dentist she had met at UNAN. Both of them had won awards for best student. Thereafter she went by the name "Vilma Núñez de Escorcia". They have two children (Otto and Eugenia), four grandchildren and one great-grandchild.

== Works ==
- 1990, ed., Independencia del poder justicial: Construimos la democracia fortaleciendo el poder judicial

== See also ==
- Sofía Montenegro – Nicaraguan women's rights and press freedom advocate
- Francisca Ramírez – Nicaraguan leader of the campesinsos movement
