= Nicaraguan Center for Human Rights =

Nicaraguan human rights organization

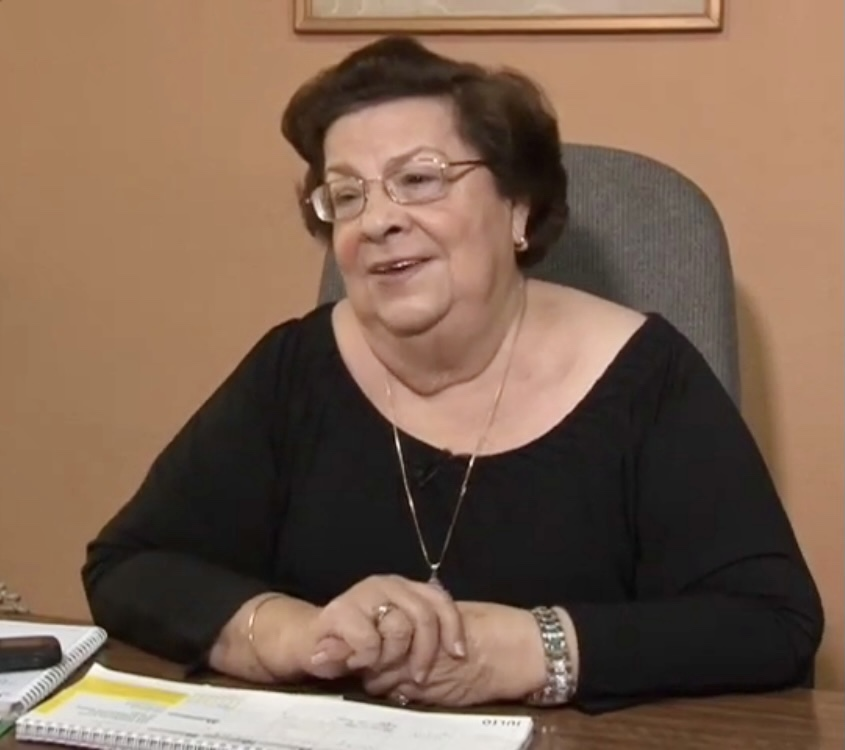
- Established: May 1990 (35 years ago)

The Nicaraguan Center for Human Rights (Centro Nicaragüense de Derechos Humanos or CENIDH) is a non-governmental organization based in Managua. Vilma Núñez, a former Sandinista, founded the organization on May 16, 1990, shortly after the election of President Violeta Chamorro.

The Nicaraguan Center for Human Rights is active In teaching people about their legal rights. It also prepares yearly reports on the situation of human rights in Nicaragua.

On December 12, 2018, at the request of the Interior Minister, the Nicaraguan National Assembly voted to revoke the legal status of the organization.

== History ==
=== Founding CENIDH ===
In 1990, when Violeta Barrios de Chamorro defeated FSLN incumbent Daniel Ortega and assumed the Presidency, then-Sandinista official Vilma Núñez was in Geneva, Switzerland to give a speech. With an assistant, Núñez began discussing the possible creation of a body to monitor the new government, and another activist at the conference encouraged her to start a human rights foundation, donating $2500 to seed the project. This began the Nicaraguan Center for Human Rights (Centro Nicaragüense de Derechos Humanos, or CENIDH), founded on May 16, 1990. They were granted legal status in September of that year.

=== Human rights training and investigation ===
CENIDH began its work by focusing on capacity-building with training programs teaching Nicaraguans that access to education and health care were human rights. Later they also started investigating allegations of human rights violations, problems Núñez recalled as developing after conservative Constitutionalist Liberal Party (PLC) President Arnoldo Alemán took office in 1997 (Nicaragua's constitution prevented Chamorro from seeking a second term). Alemán responded by accusing Núñez of being a member of the Andrés Castro United Front (FUAC), a group of former members of the army who had re-armed. In fact CENIDH had been sought out to mediate disarmament negotiations and the Attorney General dismissed the allegations against Núñez.

=== Mounting conflict with FSLN ===
Until this point Núñez was still a strong supporter of the FSLN, although the party did not contribute to CENIDH (largely funded by foreign donations). Nevertheless CENIDH supported dissidents protesting the Chamorro and then Alemán governments. But her relationship became strained when she ran against Daniel Ortega in 1996 to be the party's candidate for President; former comrades began to attack her. The final straw came in 1998 when Zoilamérica Ortega Murillo came forward with allegations that her stepfather Daniel Ortega had raped her as a child. Zoilamérica reported the allegations to CENIDH and despite the arrival of Rosario Murillo attempting to insist Núñez refuse the case (Murillo sided with her husband against her daughter's allegations), Núñez and CENIDH took up the case, sealing her fate as an enemy of the presidential couple and their supporters. Her house was vandalized and she became subject to death threats.

Núñez continued her work undeterred, bringing and winning major cases before the Inter-American Court of Human Rights. In 2001 she brought a petition for the Yapti Tasba Masraka Nanih Asla Takanka (YATAMA) party representing indigenous people, primarily the Miskito people of the Caribbean Coast, against the Nicaraguan government for excluding them from elections.

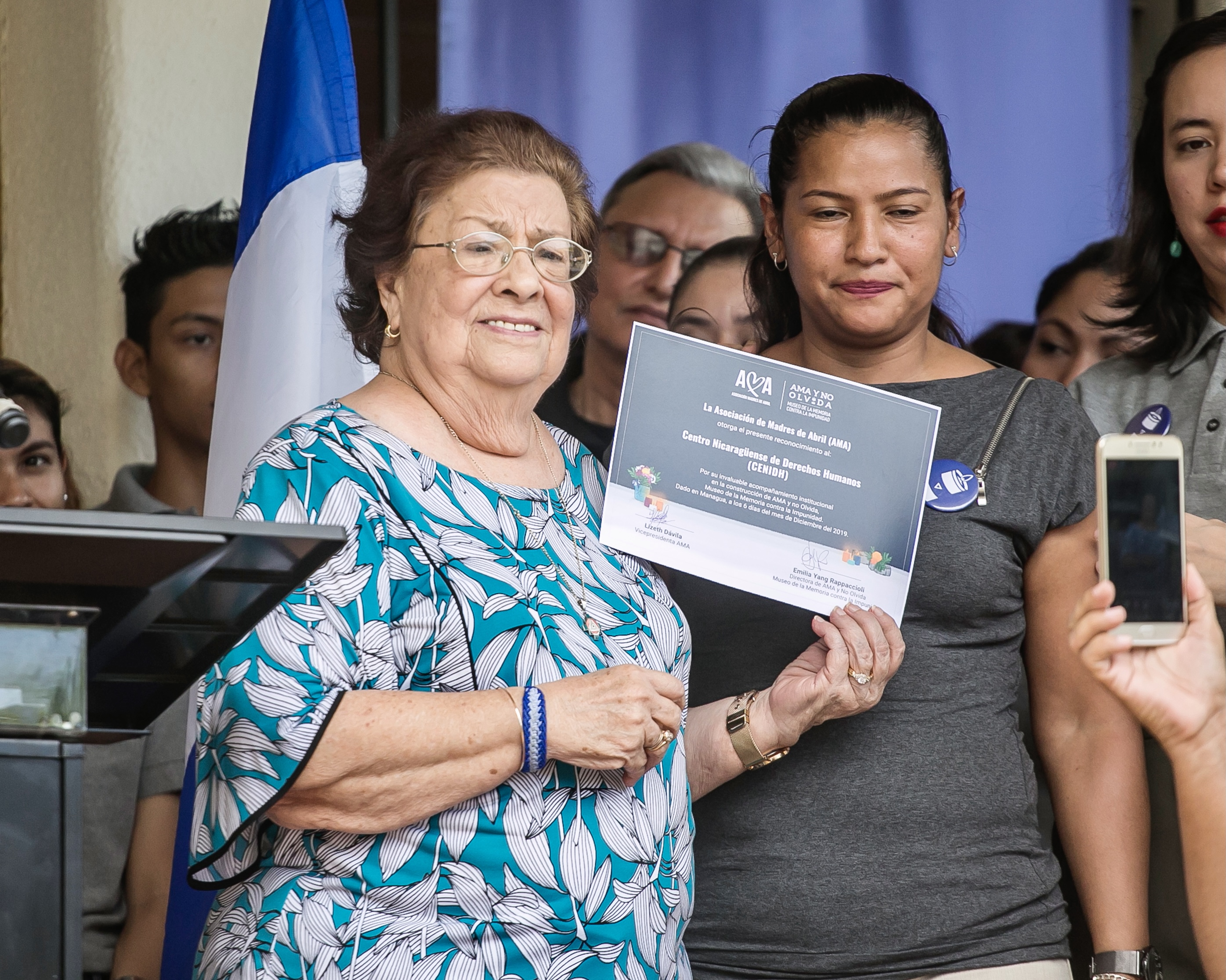
Vilma Núñez accepts a certificate of recognition on behalf of CENIDH from the Mothers of April Association in December 2019

In all, Núñez has filed more than 20 cases with the IACHR and documented thousands of allegations of human rights violations; she reports that between 2007 and 2016 (under Daniel Ortega's second presidency), 35% of the allegations (5,584 cases) were against the National Police. Threats against Núñez mounted and in 2008 and renewed annually since, the Inter-American Commission on Human Rights (IACHR) has issued precautionary measures to protect Núñez and her family, although the FSLN government has not complied with these. In 2017, Murillo (by then Nicaragua's Vice-President as well as First Lady) wrote a letter, signed by nine FSLN officials, to the US embassy in protest after Ambassador Lauren Dogu presented Núñez with an award on International Women's Day.

=== Suspension of CENIDH's legal status ===
On December 12, 2018, at the request of the FSLN Interior Minister, the FSLN-controlled National Assembly voted to revoke the legal status of CENIDH, accusing the group of using funds to "destabilize the country". Their offices were raided by some 60 police officers and some of their members were forced to go into exile in Costa Rica. Other NGOs and press outlets faced similar repression. This followed on months of anti-government protests, initially begun in April 2018 in opposition to cuts to social security, then massively expanded following a bloody crackdown by the FSLN government. Diverse sectors of Nicaraguan society joining the opposition to authoritarian repression, including Núñez who called for President Ortega to step down, while the FSLN government insisted the mass resistance was a foreign-orchestrated coup attempt. Núñez rejected the accusation against CENIDH specifically as well as the protestors in general,. and vowed to keep fighting for the rights of Nicaraguans. The Inter-American Commission on Human Rights, Amnesty International and the World Center against Torture issued statements of support for CENIDH and concern about repression of human rights by the Nicaraguan government.

While it was now more difficult, Núñez continued her work with CENIDH for the next two years until she and other organizations encountered a new hurdle in the form of the Law for the Regulation of Foreign Agents, passed by the National Assembly on October 15, 2020. This required any organization receiving foreign funding to register as a foreign agent. Núñez is contesting the constitutionality of this new requirement, which would subject implicated organizations to possible intervention in their property and assets as well as threatens their legal status if the government judges that they're intervening in internal politics. More than 60 organizations have filed appeals to the Supreme Court asking that the law be partially repealed. Núñez critiques both the assertion that foreign funding implies representing external interests, as well as the implication of criminality it carries. She says:

"I'm a Nicaraguan. I was born in Nicaragua, I live in Nicaragua, and I'm going to die in Nicaragua. So, I can't in any way refrain from appealing this law, and I'm not going to register."
