= 2001 Nicaraguan general election =

- 4 November 2001
- Presidential election

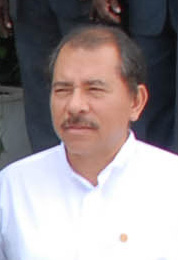
Candidate	Enrique Bolaños	Daniel Ortega
Party	PLC	FSLN
Running mate	José Rizo	Agustín Jarquín
Popular vote	1,228,412	922,436
Percentage	56.31%	42.28%
- Results by department
President before election
Arnoldo Alemán
PLC
Elected President
Enrique Bolaños
PLC
- Parliamentary election
- 90 seats in the National Assembly; 46 seats needed for a majority
Party	Leader	Vote %	Seats	+/–
PLC	Enrique Bolaños	53.23	52	+10
FSLN	Daniel Ortega	42.13	37	+1
Conservative	Alberto Saborío	4.64	1	−2
This lists parties that won seats. See the complete results below.
President of the National Assembly before	President of the National Assembly after
Óscar Moncada; PLC	Arnoldo Alemán; PLC

General elections were held in Nicaragua on 4 November 2001 to elect the President and the members of the National Assembly. Enrique Bolaños of the Constitutionalist Liberal Party (PLC) was elected president, with Daniel Ortega losing his third successive presidential election. The Constitutionalist Liberal Party also won the parliamentary elections, receiving over half the vote and 52 of the 92 seats.

The elections were characterized as free and fair by election monitors. There was no electoral violence.

== Results ==
=== President ===
Candidate	Running mate	Party	Votes	%
Enrique Bolaños	José Rizo	Constitutionalist Liberal Party	1,228,412	56.31
Daniel Ortega	Agustín Jarquín	Sandinista National Liberation Front	922,436	42.28
Alberto Saborío	Consuelo Sequeira	Conservative Party	30,670	1.41
Total			2,181,518	100.00
Registered voters/turnout			2,980,641	–
Source: CSE, IPADE

=== National Assembly ===
Party	National			Departmental			Total seats
Party	Votes	%	Seats	Votes	%	Seats	Total seats
Constitutionalist Liberal Party	1,144,182	53.23	11	1,132,876	52.60	41	52
Sandinista National Liberation Front	905,589	42.13	9	901,254	41.84	28	37
Conservative Party	99,673	4.64	0	105,130	4.88	1	1
YATAMA				11,139	0.52	0	0
Multiethnic Party for Coast Unity				3,520	0.16	0	0
Special members (Note: The runner-up in the presidential election and the outgoing president are special members of the National Assembly.)							2
Total	2,149,444	100.00	20	2,153,919	100.00	70	92
Source: CSE, CSE, IRI

==== By region ====
Region	FSLN	PLC	PCN	Other
Boaco	27.98%	68.43%	3.60%	0.00%
Carazo	46.44%	48.61%	4.95%	0.00%
Chinandega	50.54%	43.98%	5.48%	0.00%
Chontales	27.65%	65.39%	6.96%	0.00%
Esteli	50.57%	45.84%	3.59%	0.00%
Granada	38.29%	47.72%	13.98%	0.00%
Jinotega	38.08%	59.67%	2.25%	0.00%
Leon	51.08%	45.35%	3.56%	0.00%
Madriz	46.13%	50.22%	3.66%	0.00%
Managua	44.22%	49.32%	6.47%	0.00%
Masaya	41.77%	53.64%	4.59%	0.00%
Matagalpa	39.24%	57.50%	3.26%	0.00%
Nueva Segovia	45.97%	52.61%	1.42%	0.00%
RAAN	37.42%	43.87%	1.96%	16.75%
RAAS	21.34%	73.11%	1.84%	3.71%
Rio San Juan	34.96%	59.40%	5.64%	0.00%
Rivas	41.06%	51.56%	7.38%	0.00%
Source: Constituency Level Elections Archive

=== Central American Parliament ===
Party	Votes	%	Seats
Constitutionalist Liberal Party	1,150,115	53.43	11
Sandinista National Liberation Front	907,237	42.14	9
Conservative Party	95,367	4.43	0
Total	2,152,719	100.00	20
Source: CSE, IRI
