= Alba Luz Ramos =

President of the Nicaraguan Supreme Court

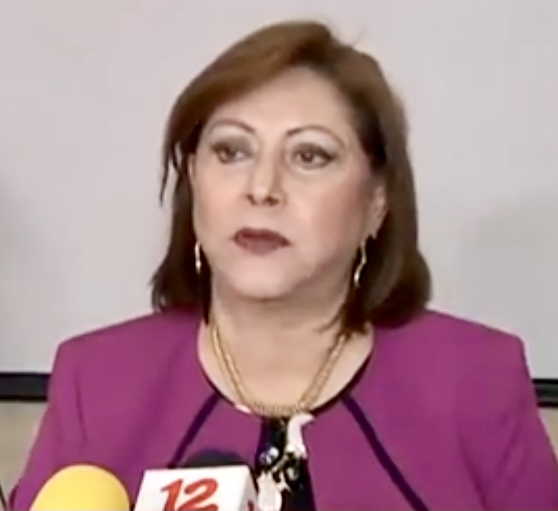
- Ramos in 2017
- Born: Alba Luz Ramos Vanegas; June 3, 1949 (age 77); León, Nicaragua
- Education: National Autonomous University of Nicaragua-León
- Occupations: Lawyer, judge
- Years active: 1973–present
- Organization: Supreme Court of Justice (Nicaragua)
- Title: President
- Term: 2002–2003, 2010–present
- Political party: Sandinista National Liberation Front

Alba Luz Ramos Vanegas (born June 3, 1949) is a Nicaraguan lawyer and judge. She has served as president of the Supreme Court of Justice since 2010, and between 2003 and 2003. She is member of the Sandinista National Liberation Front since the 1970s.

== Early life ==
Alba Luz Ramos Vanegas was born June 3, 1949, in León, Nicaragua to Adán Ramos Moncada and Margarita Vanegas de Ramos. She attended primary and secondary school at Colegio Pureza de María in León, graduating in 1968. She attended the National Autonomous University of Nicaragua (UNAN-León), graduating with honors and a gold medal in 1973.

In León, she was a member of the Student Revolutionary Front (FER) of the Sandinista National Liberation Front (FSLN), participating in the struggle to overthrow the Somoza dictatorship under the pseudonym "Natalia". Following the Case Chema raid in 1974, she was under investigation for her activities and left the country, studying French in Lausanne and English in London and then Texas where her sister lived.

== Career ==
Ramos became a lawyer in December 1973.

She returned to Nicaragua in 1979 as Anastasio Somoza Debayle fell, and in 1981 became a civil servant with the FSLN, working as National Director of Registries. In 1983 she became Criminal Attorney of the Republic and in 1984 Vice Minister of Justice.

She became a magistrate at the Supreme Court of Justice (CSJ) in 1988, then from 1996 to 1998 was its vice-president. She served as president twice: from 2002 to 2003 and since 2010. The body re-elected her president in 2019, with Marvin Aguilar Garcia serving as vice-president.

Once a member of the National Women’s Coalition, Ramos was a co-author and principal proponent of Law 779, a comprehensive bill aimed at violence against women, which was enacted by the National Assembly in 2012 and heralded by women’s groups as “saving lives”. However in 2014, two presidential decrees removed much of the force of the law and Ramos drew criticism from feminist leaders for arguing there was a legal basis for rolling back a law she had helped write.

In 2017, La Prensa began a profile of Ramos by saying: “If there is any official in Daniel Ortega's Nicaragua who has the affection and admiration of various social and political sectors, including those antagonistic to the government of the caudillo, that official is a woman, and her name is Alba Luz Ramos Vanegas.” At the same time, they noted that critics and constitutional law experts were disapproving of her administration of one of Nicaragua’s three main branches of government. Doctor of Constitutional Law Gabriel Álvarez praised her work training members of the judiciary, improving its infrastructure and the body of regulations it had produced; yet felt these were outweighed by rulings like the one allowing Daniel Ortega to be re-elected despite constitutional term limits; rejecting of a constitutional appeal of the Nicaragua Canal law (Law 840) on a political rather than legal basis; the ruling he termed “political delirium” that removed Eduardo Montealegre from the Independent Liberal Party (PLI) ticket and installed a replacement; as well as news reports that CSJ magistrates met with Ortega’s deputies to solicit his preferences. Regarding the latter, Ramos rejected the claim that judicial independence was compromised.

In August 2021, following on the arrests of seven presidential pre-candidates in the 2021 Nicaraguan general election, Ramos was sanctioned by the European Union (EU), which charged her with undermining the rule of law by using the justice system to favor Ortega's administration, specifically by selectively criminalizing opponents, violating due process, and arbitrary detaining and disqualifying opposition candidates and political parties. This froze any assets in the EU and barred doing business with European companies or traveling to the EU. In November, she was also sanctioned by Canada and the United Kingdom.

== Personal life ==
Ramos was married to Leónidas Arellano Hartin, who died in 2000. She has a daughter and two grandchildren, as of 2017.

In 2009, she faced nepotism allegations, and acknowledged that judges Abelardo Alvir Ramos and Adda Benicia Vanegas Ramos were her nephew and niece, and that the public defender Egberto Adán Ramos Solís was also her nephew. She insisted they had earned their positions but Nicaraguan law barred any hires of relatives by people in positions of power.

== See also ==
- Rafael Solís (jurist)
