= Milú Vargas =

Nicaraguan lawyer and activist

- Born: María de Lourdes Fátima Vargas Escobar; 1 May 1950; Managua, Nicaragua
- Died: 13 June 2024 (aged 74); Managua, Nicaragua
- Other names: María Lourdes Vargas, Milú Vargas Escobar
- Occupations: constitutional lawyer, human rights and feminist activist
- Years active: 1975–2023

Milú Vargas (born María de Lourdes Fátima Vargas Escobar; 1 May 1950 – 13 June 2024) was a Nicaraguan lawyer and activist. She served as the chief legal council to the National Assembly, helping draft the 1987 Constitution of Nicaragua, and founded the Carlos Núñez Téllez Center for Constitutional Rights. She was one of the founders of the Asociación de Mujeres ante la Problemática Nacional (Association of Women Concerned about National Crisis, AMPRONAC), which later became the Asociación de Mujeres Nicaragüenes Luisa Amanda Espinoza (Luisa Amanda Espinoza Association of Nicaraguan Women, AMNLAE) and remained on its board for many years. A radical feminist, who believed that equal rights should prevail for men and women, she was outspoken against the anti-sodomy law passed by the legislature in 1992.

== Early life ==
María de Lourdes Fátima Vargas Escobar, known as Milú Vargas, was born on 1 May 1950 in Managua, Nicaragua to Otilia Escobar and Gustavo Adolfo Vargas López. She had three older siblings and two much younger siblings from her father's remarriage after her mother's death when Vargas was seven. Her father was an attorney and as a member of the Conservative Party was opposed to the Somoza regime. She attended La Asunción school and during her high school days participated in social projects in poorer neighborhoods. This experience had a profound effect on her, as it made her acutely aware of social inequalities. In 1969, she entered the Central American University in Managua. In her first days at university, Vargas joined the Frente Sandinista de Liberación Nacional (Sandinista National Liberation Front, FSLN). After completing her law degree, she married and then in 1973 undertook her graduate studies, obtaining a constitutional law degree from the University of Pittsburgh in the United States.

== Career ==
Returning to Nicaragua in 1974, Vargas gave birth to her daughter, Denise, and separated from her husband the following year. In 1975, she joined her father's former law firm, as the only woman lawyer, but found the office's sexism difficult. In 1977, when the FSLN decided to establish a women's organization, Vargas was recruited by Lea Guido and became a founding member of the Asociación de Mujeres ante la Problemática Nacional (Association of Women Concerned about National Crisis, AMPRONAC). According to Vargas, joining AMPRONAC "marked an important shift in the direction of [her] political work", changing the focus to working with women.

In 1980, after the overthrow of Anastasio Somoza DeBayle, when the FSLN required formal party membership, Vargas applied for membership. About the same time, she began a relationship with Carlos Núñez Téllez, who was a high-ranking member and though still married, had been separated from his first wife. Their relationship caused a scandal in the conservative country and prevented Vargas from membership in the party for several years. By 1982, she was working for the state, as the chief legal council for the National Assembly but was still denied party membership, as the examiners believed that she was using her relationship with Nuñez Téllez to acquire power of her own. She would not be granted party membership until 1986, the same year she married Núñez Téllez.

Vargas, who had continued to serve on the executive board of AMRPONAC, which had become the Asociación de Mujeres Nicaragüenes Luisa Amanda Espinoza (Luisa Amanda Espinoza Association of Nicaraguan Women, AMNLAE) began to feel that the organization was not sufficiently addressing the real issues faced by women, such as family planning, motherhood, violence, unequal pay, and discrimination against women. They discussed how each of these challenges were similar and different for diverse women sectors. In 1986, she joined efforts with poet Gioconda Belli and journalist Sofía Montenegro to found the Partido de la Izquierda Erotica (Party of Erotic Left, PIE). Their platform wanted to empower not only women but all marginalized people and aimed at political reform to combat the sexism that had become ingrained in Daniel Ortega's campaign.

Near the end of the election in 1987, PIE members put their support behind the FSLN, but had gained enough influence to press for modifications to the Constitution. Vargas led the drive to draft the new constitution and was successful in expanding women's rights and gender equality in the newly framed document. By 1990, she began advocating for a separation between the FSLN and AMNLAE to enable and empower the women in the movement to make their own decisions and implement their own plans of action, independently from the party line. Hosting a conference with the theme Unidas en la Diversidad (United in Difference), some women along with Vargas began to explore the means to claim their own autonomy. Still, other women feared that separating from the FSLN would weaken the party. Ultimately, Vargas left AMNLAE, preferring to work independently on feminist issues.

From 1988 to 1990, Vargas led the women's secretariat of the Confederación de Asociaciones de Profesionales "Héroes y Mártires" ("Heroes and Martyrs" Confederation of Professional Associations, CONAPRO-HM). Because the organization received no funding from the FSLN, the organization was able to coordinate actions with a broader network of women's organizations, which might not have the same political goals. Whereas AMNLAE focused on policies formed in conjunction with FSLN protocols, CONAPRO H-M, under Vargas' direction focused on existing law and interpretations of the constitution, organizing international conferences to study women rights and law. The organization published a newspaper and operated a radio program to disseminate new ideas about what roles women had in society. Using the language of the Sandinista revolutionaries, Vargas argued that women's involvement in politics was a fight against oppression and subordination which could redefine personhood, benefitting both men and women.

In the 1990 elections, Vargas was elected to the National Assembly as an alternate and was appointed as the Ministry of Health's legal advisor. That year, her husband died and she founded the Carlos Núñez Téllez Center for Constitutional Rights in 1991, serving as its president. The center advocates for the rights of women, and advocates for greater decentralization and democratization of government. It also focuses on instances where the constitution may be in conflict or violating international human rights treaties. In 1992, she and others from the Center for Constitutional Rights began working on the reform of the statutes dealing with rape and sodomy in Nicaragua, as part of the Commission on Women, Youth, Children and the Family established across party lines by the administration of President Violeta Chamorro.

The goals of Vargas and the other women were to broaden the definition of rape, increase the penalties for the crime, decriminalize abortion for rape victims and delete the penalties for consensual sodomy from the legal code. Vargas believed in equal rights for men and women and said that the anti-sodomy law violated her own personal freedoms. In her proposed reforms to the sexual statutes, Vargas insisted that there be recognition that both men and women could be perpetrators or victims of sexual crimes. Heated debate followed, and though many of the reforms were adopted as Vargas had proposed them, decriminalization of abortion for rape victims and consensual sodomy did not become part of the revised penal code. Instead, the changes to the portion of the code that dealt with sodomy were amended to provide vague language and penalties that could apply to activists working on behalf of LGBT communities. The Center for Constitutional Rights immediately filed a brief, challenging the constitutionality of Article 204, but the law was upheld by the Supreme Court in 1994.

In 1996, Vargas remarried and moved to Spain. She earned her doctorate in Constitutional Law from the Charles III University of Madrid and obtained a master's degree in sexuality and human relations from the Universidad de Alcalá de Henares, studying with Fina Sanz. In 2000, she co-founded the Colectivo Sororidad in Madrid, with Manolita del Arco to spark debate, study, and training among feminists. From 2008, she worked as the director of the immigration section for the Federación de Mujeres Progresistas de España (Federation of Progressive Spanish Women) and then did consultant work at Adagio, SLL.
