= Brooklyn Rivera (politician) =

Nicaraguan Miskito activist and politician (1952–2026)

Minister of Autonomous Development of Nicaragua
- In office 1990s
- President: Violeta Chamorro

Member of the National Assembly of Nicaragua
- In office 2007 – 29 September 2023

Personal details
- Born: Brooklyn Rivera Bryan; 24 September 1952 Zelaya, Nicaragua
- Died: 30 May 2026 (aged 73) Managua, Nicaragua
- Party: YATAMA
- Education: National Autonomous University of Nicaragua
- Occupation: Miskito activist

Brooklyn Rivera Bryan (24 September 1952 – 30 May 2026) was a Nicaraguan Miskito activist and politician. A member of YATAMA, he served as minister of autonomous development of Nicaragua in the 1990s and in the National Assembly of Nicaragua from 2007 to 2023.

== Early life and career ==
Rivera was born in the department of Zelaya, the son of Miskito parents. At the age of sixteen, he and his family moved to Managua. He attended the National Autonomous University of Nicaragua, earning his bachelor's degree in mathematics. Thereafter, he was involved in the Miskitu fight for political freedom and cultural recognition.

In 1986, Rivera survived an armed attack from Sandinista forces, which he survived from numerous military attacks and sought refugee status in San Andrés Island in Colombia. In 1987, he led an effort to unify Miskitu resistance, and in 1988, he and Steadman Fagoth founded the Indigenous political party YATAMA. In the 1990s, he was a professor at Bluefields Indian and Caribbean University. During the Violeta Chamorro administration, he served as minister of autonomous development of Nicaragua.

He served in the National Assembly of Nicaragua from 2007 until 29 September 2023. During his service in the National Assembly, in April 2023, he participated in a meeting of the United Nations, and spoke out against the government of Nicaragua. After returning to Nicaragua, he was arrested on 29 September 2023 in Bilwi, and was accused of terrorism. Following the arrest, on 4 October 2023, his political party's legal status was revoked by the Supreme Electoral Council of Nicaragua. He was imprisoned at the Nicaragua Prison until his death in 2026.

== Personal life and death ==
On 27 May 2026, Co-Presidents Daniel Ortega and Rosario Murillo released photos of Rivera who was hooked up to multiple tubes in a hospital bed. According to the Associated Press, the United States demanded release of Rivera after seeing the critical condition that he was in.

Rivera died at the Fernando Velez Paiz Hospital in Managua, on 30 May 2026, at the age of 73. On 31 May 2026, Co-Presidents Ortega and Murillo claimed that Rivera had died of a bacteria infection from COVID-19.
