= List of radio stations in Nicaragua =

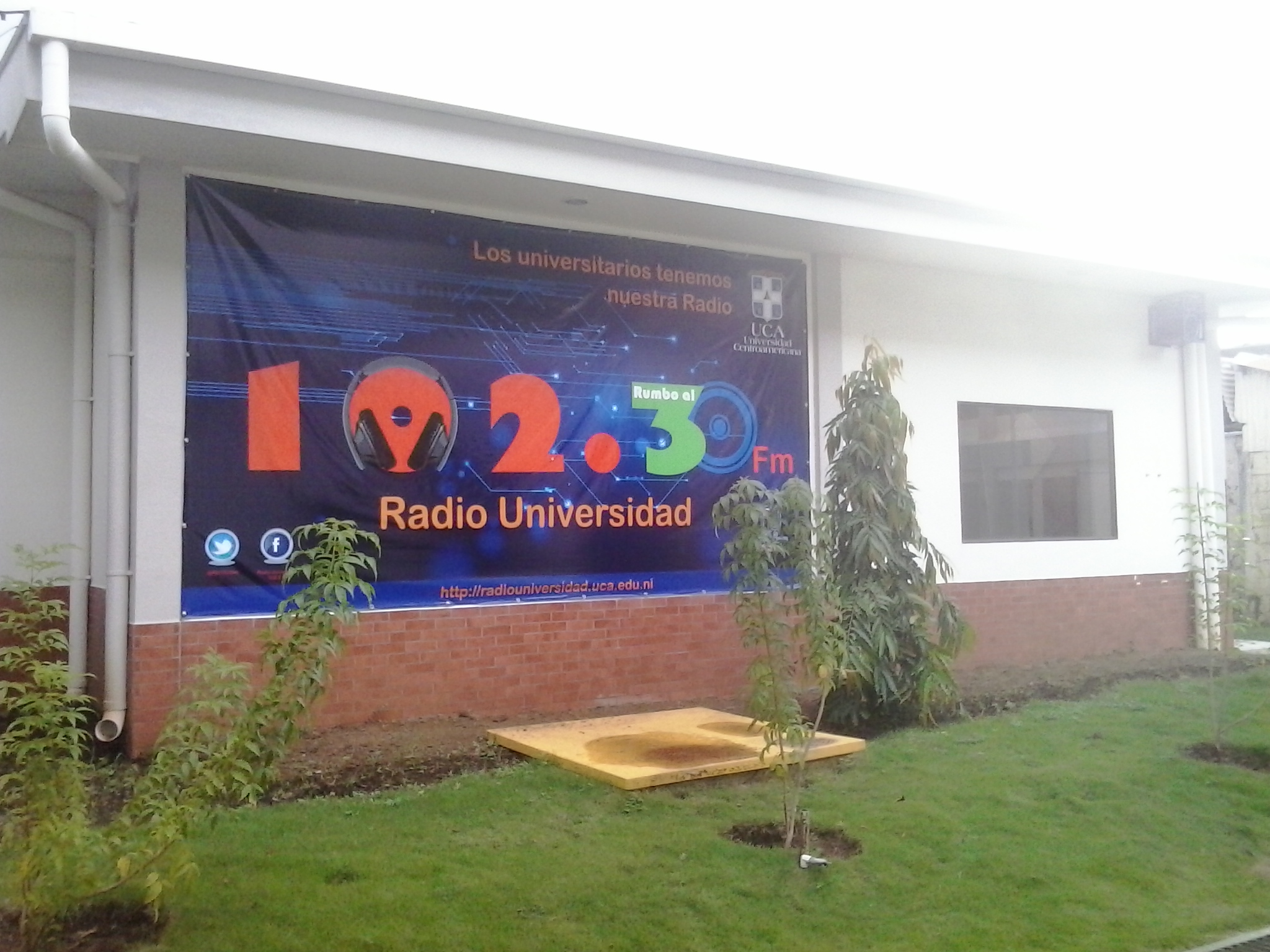
Radio Universidad at the Universidad Centroamericana (UCA) in Managua, Nicaragua.

Frequency	Name	Website
90.5 FM & 620 AM	Radio Nicaragua, Managua	
91.7 FM & 680 AM	Radio La Primerísima, Managua	
107.5FM & 740 AM	Radio Sandino, Managua	
105.3 FM	Stereo Romance, Managua	
103.5 FM & 1440 AM	Radio Maranatha, Managua	
99.1 FM & 600 AM	La Nueva Radio Ya, Managua	
97.5 FM & 540 AM	Radio Corporación, Managua	
95.7 FM	Radio Life, Matagalpa	
107.7 FM	Radio Sultana, Granada	
90.1 FM	Radio Stereo Yes, Matagalpa	
101.5 FM	Radio Juvenil, Managua	
102.3 FM	Radio Universidad, Managua	
580 AM	La Radio 580, Managua	
101.7 FM	Radio Vos, Matagalpa	
98.5 FM	Radio Camoapa, Camoapa	

Radio Stereo Alegre Jinotepe 88.3 Radio La Buena Onda Jinotepe 91.1 Radio Eco Stereo Jinotepe 92.9 Nuevo Tiempo Diriamba 98.9 Radio Camoapa Camoapa 98.5 FM Radio Stereo Romance Jinotepe 105.3 Radio Stereo Sur Jinotepe 106.9 Radio La Voz de Teresa Santa Teresa 1530
