= Enrique Bolaños =

President of Nicaragua from 2002 to 2007

- Official portrait, 2002

President of Nicaragua
- In office 10 January 2002 – 10 January 2007
- Vice President: José Rizo Castellón (2002–2005); Alfredo Gómez Urcuyo (2005–2007)
- Preceded by: Arnoldo Alemán
- Succeeded by: Daniel Ortega

Vice President of Nicaragua
- In office 10 January 1997 – 24 October 2000
- President: Arnoldo Alemán
- Preceded by: Julia Mena
- Succeeded by: Leopoldo Navarro

Personal details
- Born: Enrique José Bolaños Geyer; 13 May 1928 Nindirí, Masaya Department, Nicaragua
- Died: 14 June 2021 (aged 93) Nindirí, Masaya Department, Nicaragua
- Resting place: Monimbo's cemetery
- Party: Alliance for the Republic
- Other political affiliations: Constitutionalist Liberal Party
- Spouse: Lila Abaunza (m. 1949; died 2008)
- Children: 5
- Education: Saint Louis University

Enrique José Bolaños Geyer (pronounced [enˈrike βoˈlaɲos]; 13 May 1928 – 14 June 2021) was a Nicaraguan politician who served as the president of Nicaragua from 10 January 2002 to 10 January 2007.

From 1997 to 2002, Bolaños served as vice president under Arnoldo Alemán. On 4 November 2001 he defeated former president Daniel Ortega of the Sandinista National Liberation Front in the presidential election and was sworn in as president on 10 January 2002. He was a member of the Constitutional Liberal Party (PLC) until he broke with it to help form the Alliance for the Republic (APRE). At the beginning of his term as president, he led an anti-corruption campaign that ultimately convicted Alemán, his predecessor and head of the PLC, to 20 years in prison.

== Early life and career ==
Bolaños was born in Masaya, Nicaragua, on 13 May 1928. He received his primary and secondary education in Nicaragua at the Jesuit Colegio Centro América, and graduated from Saint Louis University in the United States with a degree in industrial engineering. He married Lila Teresita Abaunza in 1949. They had five children, a daughter and four sons, including Enrique Bolaños Abaunza who is head of INCAE Business School.

With his brothers Alejandro and Nicolás, in 1952 high cotton prices promoted him to begin an agro-production enterprise. This grew into the business, founded in 1964, SAIMSA (Industrial Agricultural Services of Masaya), a consortium that became one of the largest cotton producers in Central America by the 1970s. Bolaños served as an active member of the influential business chamber COSEP (Superior Council for Private Enterprise), and served as its president from 1983 to 1988. Under his leadership, COSEP was a vigorously anti-Sandinista institution; Bolaños described himself as anti-communist and believed investment was the way to lift the country out of poverty.

Bolaños publicly opposed Daniel Ortega's Sandinista government during the 1980s. After COSEP sent a letter criticizing the Junta of National Reconstruction, Bolaños was one of the COSEP figures arrested, on 20 October 1981 and held for six days, though he was not yet part of the COSEP leadership which signed the aforementioned letter. One month later he was imprisoned again upon returning from an AIL (Association of Latin American Enterprises) conference in Venezuela. Under the government's controversial agrarian reform program, in 1985 SAIMSA was confiscated by the government. Bolaños characterized the confiscation as a reprisal for his political activities. He worked as a computer programmer following the confiscation of his business.

In October 1995 Bolaños was elected campaign manager for the Liberal Constitutionalist Party (PLC) in the 1996 elections. The following May, he was chosen by presidential candidate and former mayor of Managua Arnoldo Alemán as the PLC's vice-presidential candidate. The ticket defeated perennial Sandinista candidate Ortega with 51% of the vote, and Alemán and Bolaños were sworn in as president and vice president, respectively, on 10 January 1997.

== Presidency (2002–2007) ==
Presidential styles of Enrique Bolaños
- Reference style: El Honorable Enrique Bolaños, Presidente de la República de Nicaragua; The Honorable Enrique Bolaños, President of the Republic of Nicaragua
- Spoken style: Presidente Bolaños President Bolaños
- Alternative style: Señor Presidente Mister President

Bolaños was chosen as the presidential candidate for the 2001 elections at the Grand Convention of the Constitutionalist Liberal Party (PLC) meeting in 2001. Facing a country still recovering from the devastation wrought by Hurricane Mitch in 1998, Bolaños campaigned on the slogan "let's roll up our sleeves". He won the presidential elections with 56.3% of the vote, while Daniel Ortega received 42.3% and Conservative Party candidate Alberto Saborio received 1.4%.

Bolaños was sworn in as President of the Republic of Nicaragua on 10 January 2002 to serve a five-year term (2002–2007). Two days later, he began an anti-corruption campaign to investigate and prosecute all former and current state employees who engaged in corrupt behavior. In August this resulted in the prosecution, and ultimately the conviction of his predecessor Alemán with fraud, money laundering, and misuse of public funds, in sums totaling almost $100 million. The case, known as "la huaca", is one of the largest in Nicaraguan history. Alemán served six of a 20-year sentence, mainly under house arrest, until he was acquitted by the Ortega administration in 2009.

Throughout his administration, Bolaños faced obstacles from power based outside the Presidency, later citing what he characterized as three coup attempts against his government: the first, early in his tenure came when the Supreme Court of Justice of Nicaragua sent an accusation to the National Assembly that he had used funds from the "huaca" to finance his electoral campaign and asked to reverse it. The second came in 2004 when an opinion from the Comptroller's Office sent to the National Assembly sought to remove him from office. Finally, in September 2005, Bolaños publicly denounced as a "slow motion coup" the joint efforts of Ortega, Alemán, the PLC, and the FSLN, together with the National Assembly, which attempted constitutional reforms to strip him of power. Demonstrations called by the FSLN backed the National Assembly's actions. The executive branch was partially stripped of its powers to appoint ministers and public officials, but, facing pressure from the international community, particularly the OAS, the EU, and the United States, constitutional changes were postponed until the following year.

Despite this crisis, he succeeded in negotiating the ratification of the Central American Free Trade Agreement (CAFTA) by the National Assembly; as well as the forgiveness of 80% of Nicaragua's debts by creditors. Focused on macroeconomics, he set up investment incentives that spurred sustained economic growth at levels the country had not seen in decades; but this emphasis came at the expense of policies to help the poor, something his adversary Ortega seized on to fuel opposition.

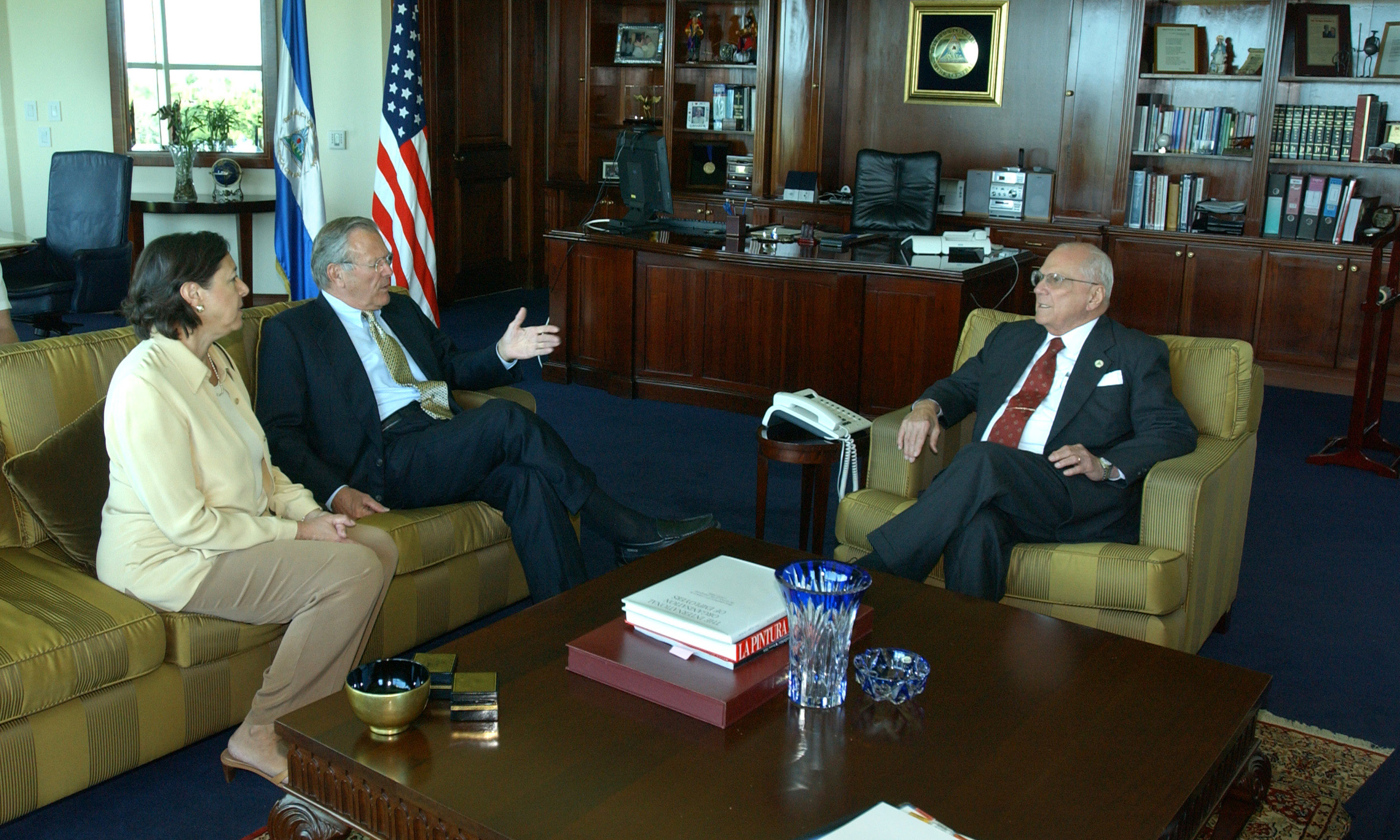
Bolaños (right) with U.S Secretary of Defense Donald H. Rumsfeld in 2004

A staunch conservative, Bolaños allegedly ordered the compilation of a list of public officials "suspected" of being part of the "gay-lesbian world". In November 2006, abortion was outlawed under all circumstances and Bolaños proposed a 30-year prison sentence as punishment.

During the 2006 presidential election campaign, the Nicaraguan Constitution barred the incumbent from seeking re-election and Bolaños's Alliance for the Republic party (APRE) joined the Nicaraguan Liberal Alliance, whose candidate Eduardo Montealegre took second place. Bolaños turned over the presidency to his longtime political opponent Daniel Ortega on 10 January 2007. As outgoing President, he was legally entitled to a seat in the new session of the National Assembly, a practice he had criticized after its creation in the 1990s as part of the "pact" between Alemán and Ortega. Bolaños instead left the political arena, formally resigning his seat in February 2007.

== Post-presidency (2007–2021) ==
Following his retirement from politics, Bolaños ran the Enrique Bolaños Foundation, a non-profit educational foundation that provides free and democratic access to all documents from Bolaños' presidency as well as many digitized collections of Nicaraguan historical, political, cultural, and juridical documents, making it one of the main centers of historical documentation in the country. It is the first Nicaraguan presidential library, and one of Latin America's first virtual presidential libraries, which Bolaños programmed and developed himself.

Despite having left politics, he remained a critic of Ortega, who Bolaños said had never left power since he first toppled Somoza in 1979.

In 2017, Bolaños published The Struggle for Power, which both gave a political history of Nicaragua from 1821 to 2007 and also served as a memoir of his time in the presidency.

His wife Lila T. Abaunza died in 2008 of a brain hemorrhage. Three of Bolaños's children also predeceased him. In August 2020, Bolaños's family shared news that he was in poor health. He died on 14 June 2021 in his home outside Managua at the age of 93. He was interred at the family crypt at Monimbó cemetery.

== Electoral history of Enrique Bolaños Geyer ==
=== VicepPresidential election results, 20 October 1996 ===
Candidate	Party/alliance	Votes	%
José Arnoldo Alemán Lacayo and Enrique Bolaños Geyer	Liberal Alliance (AL) = Constitutionalist Liberal Party (PLC) / Independent Liberal Party for National Unity (PLIUN) / Nationalist Liberal Party (PLN) / Neoliberal Party (PALI)	896,207	50.99%
José Daniel Ortega Saavedra and Juan Manuel Caldera	Sandinista National Liberation Front (FSLN)	664,909	37.83%
Others	21 political parties	196,659	11.18%
Total valid votes		1,757,775	100%
Spoilt and invalid votes		91,587	04.95%
Total votes/turnout		1,849,362	76.39%
Registered voters		2,421,067	–
Population		4,706,000	–

=== National Convention of the Constitutionalist Liberal Party (PLC) presidential primaries, 28 January 2001 ===
- Enrique Bolaños Geyer – 220 (54.6%)
- Eduardo Montealegre – 143 (35.5%)
- Iván Escobar Fornos – 38 (9.4%)
- Null – 2 (0.5%)

=== Presidential election results, 4 November 2001 ===
Candidate	Party/alliance	Votes	%
Enrique Bolaños Geyer	Constitutionalist Liberal Party (PLC)	1,228,412	56.31%
José Daniel Ortega Saavedra	Sandinista National Liberation Front (FSLN)	922,436	42.28%
Alberto Saborío	Conservative Party of Nicaragua (PC)	30,670	01.41%
Total valid votes		100%	2,181,518

Political offices
Preceded by Julia Mena	Vice President of Nicaragua; 1997–2000	Succeeded by Leopoldo Navarro
Preceded by Arnoldo Alemán	President of Nicaragua; 2002–2007	Succeeded by Daniel Ortega
Party political offices
Preceded by Arnoldo Alemán	PLC nominee for President of Nicaragua; 2001	Succeeded by José Rizo Castellón
