= Jirón =

Jirón may refer to:

== People ==
- Carlos Jirón (1955-2020), Nicaraguan politician.
- Pedro Jirón (1939-2018), Nicaraguan footballer.

== Places ==
Jirón is used as a word for street in Peru.

- Jirón de la Unión, pedestrian street located in Lima, Peru.
