= Julia Mena =

Nicaraguan politician

Vice President of Nicaragua
- In office 23 October 1995 – 10 January 1997
- President: Violeta Chamorro
- Preceded by: Virgilio Godoy
- Succeeded by: Enrique Bolaños

Personal details
- Born: 3 April 1950 (age 76) Granada
- Party: Independent Liberal Party; Sandinista National Liberation Front

Julia de la Cruz Mena Rivera (born 3 April 1950) is a Nicaraguan politician.

== Background and earlier career ==
Her profession was as a school teacher.

She was a deputy in National Assembly of Nicaragua from 1990 to 1995 and also served as first vice president of National Assembly. She was a member of the Independent Liberal Party.

== Vice President of Nicaragua (1995-1997) ==
In 1995 National Assembly elected her as Vice President following resignation of Virgilio Godoy for the remainder of the term until January 1997.

== Later career ==
Later she joined Sandinista National Liberation Front, and has served as their deputy, and also as Mayor of Granada as a Sandinista.

Political offices
Preceded by Virgilio Godoy	Vice President of Nicaragua; 1995–1997	Succeeded by Enrique Bolaños
