= Carlos Núñez Téllez =

Nicaraguan politician and Sandinista revolutionary

President of the National Assembly
- In office January 1985 – April 1990
- Succeeded by: Miriam Argüello

Personal details
- Born: Leon, Nicaragua
- Party: Sandinista National Liberation Front
- Spouse: Milú Vargas
- Children: 4
- Relatives: René Núñez Téllez (brother)

Carlos Núñez Téllez (26 July 1951 - 2 October 1990) was a Sandinista revolutionary and Nicaraguan politician. He was one of the nine commandants of the Sandinista National Liberation Front (FSLN) Directorate that assumed power after overthrowing the Somoza regime.

Núñez was born on 26 July in 1951 in Leon, Nicaragua. He and his brother René both joined the Sandinista movement, then underground, in 1969. Carlos Núñez, who received guerrilla training abroad, was quickly put in charge of operations in Leon, then assigned to Managua. In March 1979, he joined the FSLN Directorate, shortly before the FSLN succeeded in overthrowing Anastasio Somoza Debayle.

In 1984 he was elected president of the National Assembly and led the process that culminated in the 1987 establishment of the Nicaraguan Constitution. Though the FSLN lost the legislative elections in 1990, Núñez was re-elected that year. His wife Milú Vargas also served in the National Assembly.

Núñez died of a heart attack on October 2, 1990, in Havana, Cuba, where he was seeking medical treatment. Vargas and four children survived him.
