= Guillermo Arce Castaño =

Nicaraguan politician (1945–2022)

Guillermo Eduardo Arce Castaño (May 10, 1945 – March 27, 2022) was a Nicaraguan politician. He was a Sandinista National Liberation Front deputy in the National Assembly (first elected in 2011 and re-elected again in 2021) and executive director of the Nicaraguan Youth Association. His brothers were Bayardo Arce Castaño, economic advisor to President Daniel Ortega, and Gerardo Arce Castaño, a magistrate of the Supreme Court of Justice.
