= Rafael Solis =

Rafael Solis may refer to:

- Rafael Solis (boxer) (born 1959), former lightweight boxer from Puerto Rico
- Rafael Solis, former member of Mexican musical group AK-7
- Rafael Solís (jurist), former Nicaraguan Supreme Court Justice
