= Exiled (2019 film) =

2019 Nicaraguan film

- Film poster
- Spanish: Exiliada
- Directed by: Leonor Zúniga
- Written by: Leonor Zúniga
- Starring: Zoilamérica Ortega Murillo
- Edited by: Leonor Zúniga, José “Chisco” Arce
- Production company: Coproducción Nicaragua-Costa Rica
- Distributed by: Cinema Regional
- Release date: 2019
- Running time: 24 minutes
- Country: Nicaragua
- Language: Spanish

Exiled (Spanish: Exiliada) is a 2019 Nicaraguan documentary film directed by Leonor Zúniga. The film features interviews with Zoilamérica Ortega Murillo, stepdaughter of the leader of the Sandinista Revolution and Nicaraguan President Daniel Ortega. In 1998 she accused him of sexually abusing her as a child; almost twenty years later, she lives in exile in Costa Rica with her ten-year-old son. The film takes place during Ortega's electoral campaign, as he seeks reelection and reaching power for the fourth time, and develops in two periods: the past, using archive footage when Zoilamérica made her accusation in 1998, and the present, in 2016, after being forced to live in exile.

== Production ==
Zúniga wrestled with making the film, as it risked the possibility that she would also have to go into exile. Ultimately she shot the film in secret in Costa Rica, using a pseudonym to refer to Murillo during production.

== Reception ==
The film was part of the Official Selection of the 2019 Hot Docs Festival.

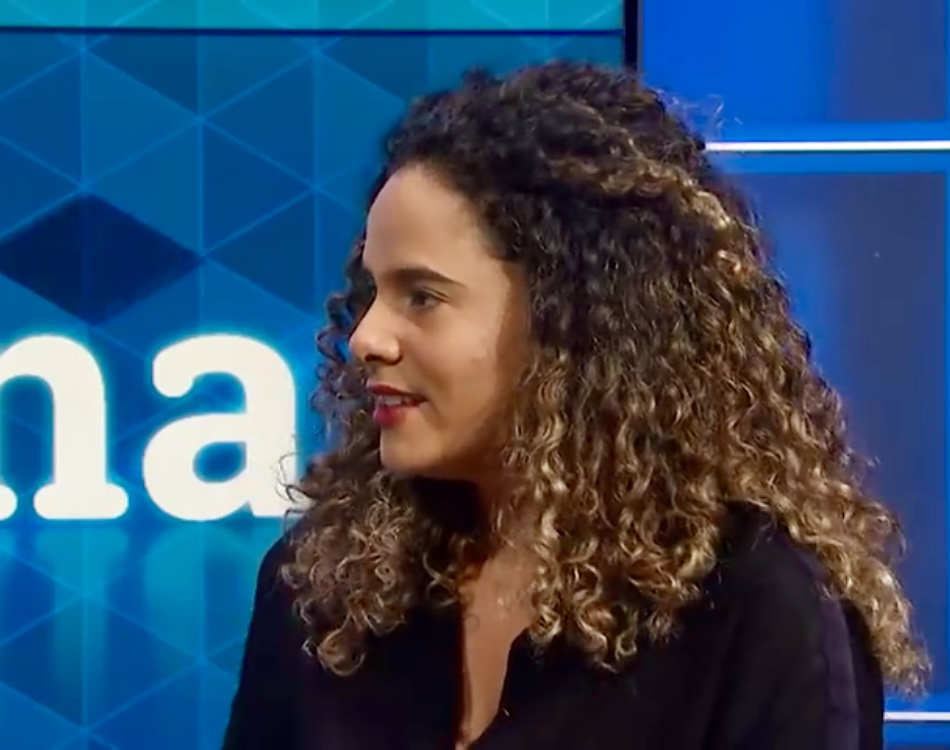
Leonor Zúniga, director of the film

In La Prensa, Cristiana Chamorro Barrios wrote that Zúniga “in a magical way, shows with art, there can be beauty in a dark tragedy. Her cameras manage to captivate us in a sordid story where the harshness of the events is told with the grace to get away from the morbid to give the victim dignity without revictimizing her.”
