= Lila T. Abaunza =

First Lady of Nicaragua from 2002 to 2007

First Lady of Nicaragua
- In role 10 January 2002 – 10 January 2007
- President: Enrique Bolaños
- Preceded by: Maria Fernanda Flores Lanzas
- Succeeded by: Rosario Murillo

Personal details
- Born: 29 January 1929 Masaya, Nicaragua
- Died: 17 July 2008 (aged 79) Masaya, Nicaragua
- Spouse: Enrique Bolaños
- Children: 5
- Parents: Alejandro Abaunza Espinoza (father); Esmeralda Abaunza Solórzano (mother)

Lila Teresita Abaunza Abaunza de Bolaños (29 January 1929 – 17 July 2008) was the First Lady of Nicaragua from 2002 until 2007 and the wife of the former President of Nicaragua, Enrique Bolaños. She was noted for her charitable work.

== Biography ==
Lila Teresita Abaunza Abaunza was born in Masaya, Nicaragua, member of a prestigious family. Her father was Alejandro Abaunza Espinoza, President of the Congress of Nicaragua and Public Work Minister and Agriculture in the Partido Liberal, son of Carlos Abaunza Cuadra and wife Dolores Espinoza. Her mother was his wife and first cousin Esmeralda Abaunza Solórzano, daughter of Fernando Abaunza Cuadra and wife Marina Solórzano Vasconcelos, daughter of Enrique Solórzano Cardoze and wife Luz Vasconcelos, both of Portuguese descent, and he the son of Ramón Solórzano Montealegre and second wife Mónica Cardoze, who by his first wife Juana Reyes Robira had Federico Solórzano Reyes, married to Rosa Gutiérrez, the parents of Carlos José Solórzano, 58th President of Nicaragua.

She was a relative by both parents of Justo Abaunza, 25th and 27th President of Nicaragua, of Fernando Guzmán, 37th President of Nicaragua and by both parents of José Vicente Cuadra, 38th President of Nicaragua.

Abaunza studied at the La Asunción College in Managua and the Sacred Heart Preparatory Menlo Park, in California, United States.

In 1949 she married her relative Enrique Bolaños, son of Mr. Nicolás Bolaños Cortés and Amanda Geyer Abaunza. Their five children were Enrique José, Lucía Amanda, Jorge Alejandro (deceased, 2005), Javier Gregorio (deceased, 2007) and Alberto (deceased, 1972). Lila de Bolaños spent much of her life undertaking charitable work and helping the poor and destitute. As wife of the President she contributed to aid in hospitals, visiting asylums of the old, giving medical support and campaigning to restore old buildings, particularly those destroyed by disasters such as Hurricane Mitch. She did much work with disabled people.

In June 2008 she was transported by air from Miami to her home in El Raizón about 22 miles outside Masaya after undergoing a serious deterioration in health. During this period she was reportedly in much pain and died on 17 July 2008 after an illness of some seven weeks. Her funeral took place on July 19 and she was buried in the Bolaños family mausoleum in Masaya.

== Culinary ==
Abaunza's Nacatamales were said to be amongst the best in Nicaragua. She was also known to be very outspoken and frank in her role as first lady.
