= Irís Montenegro =

Nicaraguan politician

President of the National Assembly
- In office September 2016 – 9 January 2017
- Preceded by: René Núñez Téllez
- Succeeded by: Gustavo Porras Cortés

Personal details
- Born: 16 August 1950 (age 74); Estelí, Nicaragua
- Political party: Sandinista National Liberation Front

Irís Marina Montenegro Blandón (born 16 August 1950) is a Nicaraguan politician for Sandinista National Liberation Front.

She was born in the city of Estelí. She studied nursing at a polytechnic university in Guatemala and at the University of Rome. She studied also municipal management and business administration. As a politician, she was a councilor at the Mayor of Managua's office (1996-2000) and as president of the Nicaraguan Nursing Association (1983-1985). She is a deputy in the National Assembly of Nicaragua (since 2002), and Vice President of the National Assembly 2012–2016. She became President for a period from September 2016 to January 2017 following the death of René Núñez Téllez.
