= Rafael Solís (jurist) =

Nicaraguan lawyer and politician (born 1953)

Rafael Solís Cerda
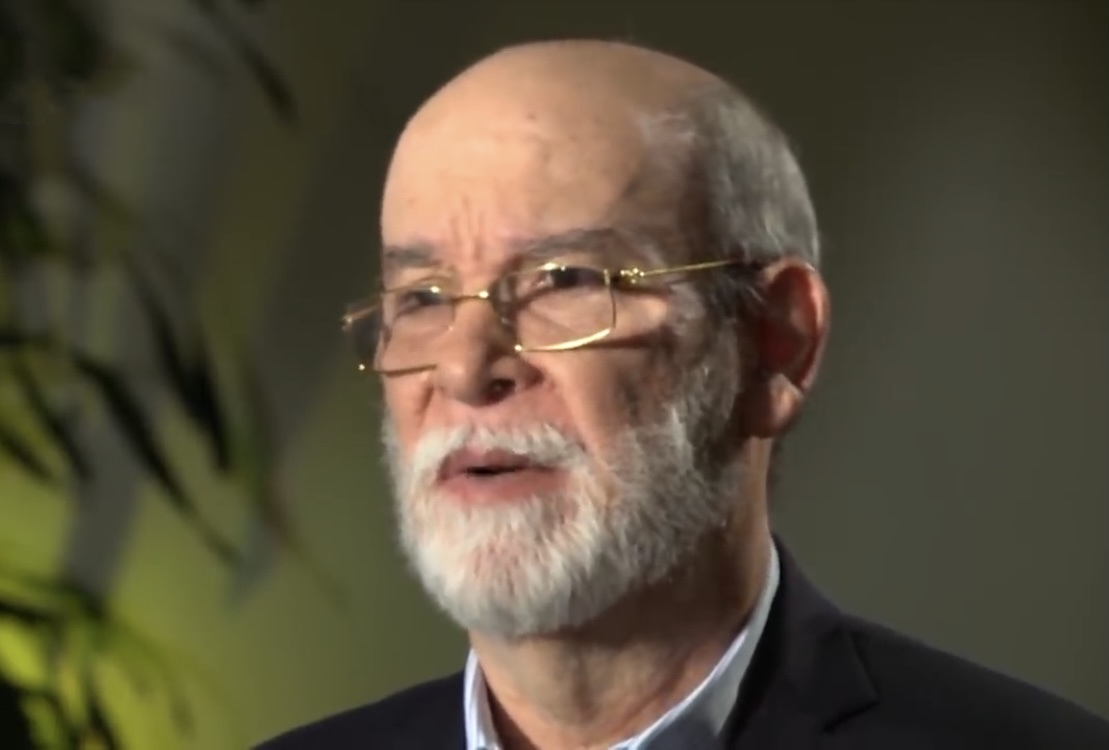
- Solís in 2019
- Born: July 25, 1953 (age 73); Managua, Nicaragua
- Education: Colegio Centro América; Central American University
- Occupations: Lawyer, politician
- Known for: Justice of the Supreme Court of Justice
- Political party: Sandinista National Liberation Front

Rafael Solís Cerda (born July 25, 1953 in Managua) is a Nicaraguan attorney, politician and former Justice of the Supreme Court of Justice (CSJ) of Nicaragua. He served on the Supreme Court for 19 years before resigning in January 2019. Before joining the Supreme Court, Solís had served in the Nicaraguan legislature and as a military leader.

== Early life ==
Solís grew up in a wealthy Catholic family and attended the Colegio Centro América in Managua, Nicaragua. He studied law at Central American University in Managua, where he became a student leader.

== Career ==
In the 1970s, Solís joined the Sandinista National Liberation Front, fighting in Managua. During the revolution he worked closely with Sandinista leader Daniel Ortega and became a long-time Ortega ally. Solís was the best man at Ortega's wedding to Rosario Murillo in 2005.

After the revolution in 1979, Solís joined the Sandinista Popular Army and was its representative in the Council of State. Shortly after, he became the Nicaraguan Ambassador to the United States for the Junta of National Reconstruction.

Following his return to Nicaragua, Solís became the First Secretary of the National Assembly from 1985 to 1990, a period in which the current Constitution of Nicaragua was approved by the Assembly. In 1990 when Violeta Chamorro was elected President, defeating the FSLN, Solis was nevertheless re-elected legislator in the National Assembly.

Solís was a Justice on the Supreme Court of Justice (CSJ) of Nicaragua for 19 years. He served as Vice-President of the Court and as a member of both its Constitutional Appeal and Criminal Appeal chambers. He was a key figure in the 2009 CSJ decision to remove presidential term limits, effectively allowing Ortega to continue to run for re-election, a decision Solis later said he regretted.

Solis resigned the Court on January 8, 2019, issuing a public letter in protest of what he described as "a state of terror" imposed by Ortega since protests broke out in the country in April 2018, with hundreds of deaths ensuing. Solis disputed Ortega's claim that violence in the country resulted from a foreign-backed attempted coup, and predicted that unless pro-Ortega paramilitary groups were disarmed, opposition groups would arm as well, eventually leading to civil war, particularly as the country's economic situation deteriorated.
