= Kus Indian Sut Asla Nicaragua ra =

The Kus Indian Sut Asla Nicaragua ra (Nicaraguan Coast Indian Unity), better known by its acronym KISAN, was a rebel organization formed in 1985 to unify the struggle of the Miskito people and other indigenous peoples of Nicaragua's Atlantic Coast against the Sandinista government. The uprising had been hampered by the bitter rivalry between two former friends, Steadman Fagoth of MISURA and Brooklyn Rivera of MISURASATA.

Delegates met on August 31, 1985, and founded KISAN on September 3. On October 3, KISAN agreed to integrate its efforts with the United Nicaraguan Opposition. However, since Rivera was not part of KISAN, and Fagoth retained some loyalists, the new organization failed to bring unity to the Atlantic rebellion. In 1987, it was replaced by YATAMA. YATAMA was dissolved in 2023.

Its directors were Wycliffe Diego, Jenelee Hodgson, Merehildo Ramo, Kenneth Bushy, Alejo Teofilo, and Rafael Zelaya.
