= Maximino Rodríguez Martínez =

Spanish lawyer

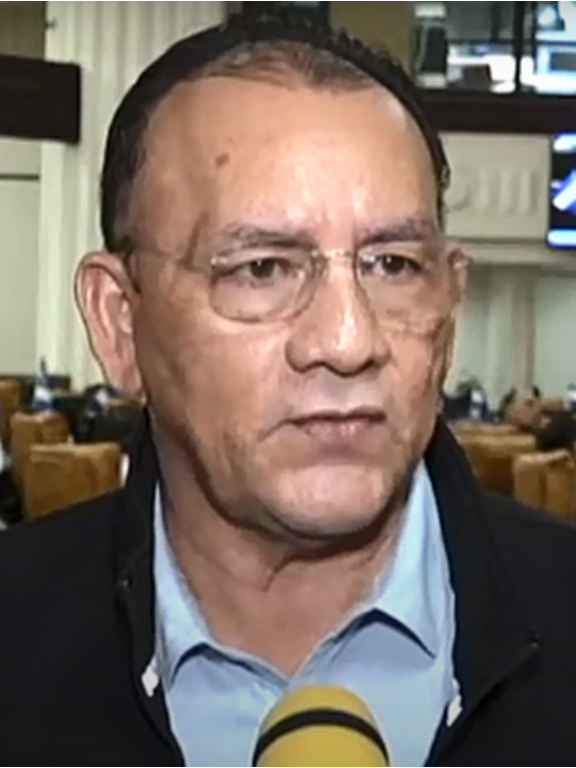

Member of the Nicaraguan National Assembly
- In office 2016–2022

Personal details
- Born: Maximino Rodríguez Martínez; 19 April 1961 (age 64) León, Nicaragua
- Party: Constitutionalist Liberal Party
- Occupation: Politician and rancher

Maximino Rodríguez Martínez (born 19 April 1961) is a Nicaraguan politician and rancher. He is a deputy of the National Assembly of Nicaragua between 2016 and 2022. He is a leader of the Nicaraguan Democratic Force organization.

He was a candidate for the presidency of the Republic of Nicaragua in the 2016 general elections for the Constitutionalist Liberal Party.

== Biography ==
During his adolescence, in the 1980s, he was a Contra. During the war he was shot in the head. In that period he participated under the pseudonym "Commander Wilmer".

Between 1996 and 2011 he was a deputy for three terms for the Constitutionalist Liberal Party.

He was a militant from 1997 to 2016; in that year he decided to resign from the Constitutionalist Liberal Party.
