= Óscar Moncada =

Nicaraguan politician (died 2014)

Óscar Moncada Reyes (died November 9, 2014) was a Nicaraguan politician. Moncada served as a member of the National Assembly for three consecutive terms from 1997 to 2011, including a tenure as the President of the National Assembly of Nicaragua from 1999 until 2001. He was the Vice President of the Constitutionalist Liberal Party (PLC) at the time of his death in 2014. Óscar Moncada was the son, from a second marriage, of former President of Nicaragua José María Moncada, who held office from 1929 to 1933.

== Early life ==
Moncada held numerous public offices and appointments during the administrations of former Presidents Violeta Barrios de Chamorro (1990–1997) and Arnoldo Alemán (1997–2002). He served as the director of human resources within the Ministry of Labor and sub-director of the Instituto de Seguro Social. He was also the secretary general of the Empresa Aguadora of Managua.

Moncada died of a heart attack at his home in Masatepe, Masaya Department, on November 9, 2014, at the age of 78.
