= Enrique Bolaños Abaunza =

Nicaraguan academic

Enrique Bolaños Abaunza (born October 30, 1950, in St. Louis, Missouri) is the eldest son of former Nicaraguan president Enrique Bolaños Geyer. Since May, 2015, he is the new president of INCAE Business School, ranked by The Wall Street Journal as one of the top 10 international business schools in the world.

Mr. Bolaños Abaunza is also the president of Fundación Enrique Bolaños, an NGO that houses the ex-president's virtual presidential library, and was CEO of Flexsys from 1999 to 2007.

In 2005 he accompanied his father, then-president Bolaños Geyer, to speak to a crowd of protesters in an effort to resolve an escalating political crisis the president called a "slow-motion-coup". Bolaños Abaunza was injured when protesters attacked the government delegation, striking him on the head with a stone. The protesters dispersed following this incident.

Bolaños was also on the 2001 shoebomber flight from Paris to Miami with two of his children. His son, Leandro Bolaños, helped restrain the culprit with his belt.
