= Radio Sandino =

- Managua; Nicaragua
- Frequencies: 107.5FM, 740 AM

Programming
- Language: Spanish

Ownership
- Owner: Grupo Comunicaciones Internacionales Digitales, S.A.

History
- First air date: 1977

Links
- Website: www.lasandino.com.ni

Radio Sandino, or La Sandino, is a Nicaraguan state-affiliated radio station.

== History and management ==
Radio Sandino was established between 1977 and 1978 by the Sandinista National Liberation Front (FSLN), and played a prominent role in the Nicaraguan Revolution.

As of 2015, Radio Sandino was part of Grupo Comunicaciones Internacionales Digitales, S.A. (CODISA), a company controlled through the proxy business network of Daniel Ortega and Rosario Murillo's family. The company's president was Yadira Leets Marín, the ex-wife of Ortega and Murillo's son Rafael. CODISA also included the radio stations La Tuani, Futura, Clásica and Viva FM.

== Content ==
Radio Sandino's content is controlled by the Nicaraguan government, and has been described as government propaganda. The station broadcasts nationally from Managua.
