= Loria Raquel Dixon Brautigam =

Nicaraguan politician

Loria Raquel Dixon Brautigam is a Nicaraguan politician, the first black person elected to the Nicaraguan National Assembly. She was elected to represent the North Atlantic Autonomous Region of Nicaragua in 2006.
