= Carlos Jirón =

Nicaraguan politician (c.1955–2020)

Carlos Alberto Jirón Bolaños (c. 1955 – 19 May 2020) was a Nicaraguan politician. He was elected to the National Assembly in November 2016 as a representative of the Constitutionalist Liberal Party from León. Jirón died on 19 May 2020, due to complications of diabetes and COVID-19, aged 65.
