= List of presidents of the National Assembly of Nicaragua =

The President of the National Assembly of Nicaragua is the presiding officer of the legislature of Nicaragua, National Assembly.

Name	Term	Notes	Party
Carlos Núñez Téllez	January 1985 – April 1990		FSLN
Miriam Argüello	April 1990 – January 1991		UNO
Alfredo César Aguirre	January 1991 – January 1993		UNO
Gustavo Tablada Zelaya	January 1993 – January 1994		PSN
Luis Humberto Guzmán	January 1994 – January 1996		PPSC
Cairo Manuel López	January 1996 – January 1997		UDC
Iván Escobar Fornos	January 1997 – January 1999		PLC
Óscar Moncada	January 1999 – January 2002		PLC
Arnoldo Alemán Lacayo	January 2002 – September 2002		PLC
Jaime Cuadra Somarriba	September 2002 – January 2004		PLC
Carlos Antonio Noguera Pastora	January 2004 – January 2005		PLC
René Núñez Téllez	January 2005 – January 2006		FSLN
Eduardo Goméz López	January 2006 – January 2007		PLC
René Núñez Téllez	January 2007 – September 2016		FSLN
Iris Marina Montenegro Blandón	September 2016 – January 2017		FSLN
Gustavo Porras Cortés	January 2017 – present		FSLN

== See also ==
- List of years in Nicaragua
- National Congress of Nicaragua - Former bicameral legislature until 1979

== Sources ==
- Various editions of The Europa World Year Book
