= Colegio Centro América =

Jesuit primary, middle and high school in Managua

Location
- South of Villa Fontana, Managua, Nicaragua; 12°5′55.5″N 86°15′56.21″W

Information
- Type: private school (and formerly boarding school)
- Motto: In all love and service
- Religious affiliation: Catholic
- Denomination: Jesuits
- Established: 1916 (110 years ago) (in Granada, Nicaragua)
- Rector: Silvio Avilez
- Grades: elementary, middle, and high school
- Gender: coeducational
- Mascot: shark
- National ranking: 1
- Website: cca.edu.ni

The Colegio Centro América is a private Catholic school located in Managua, Nicaragua.

Founded by the Jesuits in the city of Granada in 1916, the school serves as an elementary, middle, and high school. The school quickly became the preferred boarding school for children of elite families. To this day, the school is considered to be one of the best schools in the country.

During the 1940s, 1950s, and 1960s, the school was effective in educating the business elite during a period of rapid agricultural transformation and growth, which made Nicaragua the breadbasket for Central America. Many of the school's graduates became powerful farmers and ranchers, with heavy political and economic influence.

== History and operations ==
=== Foundation ===
This was under the auspices of the Mexican Province of Jesuits. They came to Nicaragua in 1916 during a time of persecution in Mexico and opened the school at Granada, Nicaragua. These Jesuits were originally from Spain, Mexico, and Italy, and from Granada would spread to the rest of Central America. Included among them was the historian Camillo Crivelli.

By 1920, it was possible to build a proper school building, with the government and church in support. This early period saw the construction, in Granada, of a library and laboratories for physics, chemistry, and biology. A zoo and a museum of natural sciences followed, both on the college campus. A stimulus behind the project was Jesuit ornithologist Bernardo Ponzol. The humanistic studies included music, theater, oratory, and declamation.

=== Change of guard ===
This period is marked by the contribution of the Jesuits from Castile, Spain, as the Mexican Jesuits were slowly leaving. While the college continued its development in Granada, around 1964 a primary school was opened in Managua on Zacarías Guerra (now Colón street) and the construction of the current building in Managua began. The move to Managua was gradual, first primary then by 1967 the whole college of Granada had moved to Managua.

=== Modern period ===
The move increased the number of students. Instead of boarding there were day students. Unlike the more conservative Grenadian society, students were more modern.

In 1975, Amando Lopez was head of the college; he would later become one of the Jesuit martyrs of El Salvador.

The triumph of the Sandinista Revolution of 1979 also brought a moment of change and crisis for the college. Changes included: compulsory military service, during which many students died; student participation in coffee harvesting and in the national literacy crusade; many parents withdrew their children from school because they did not agree with the new policies.

Then, in 1984, the college opted for co-education, with all the changes this entailed. One new emphasis goes back to Jesuit Father General Pedro Arrupe's call that Jesuits form men and women for others.

Colegio Centro America hosts immersion experiences for students from Jesuit high schools in the United States.

== Notable alumni ==
- José Coronel Urtecho
- Pablo Antonio Cuadra
- Joaquín Cuadra
- Carlos Pellas Chamorro
- Ernesto Cardenal
- Joaquín Pasos
- Jorge Salazar
- Carlos Fernando Chamorro Barrios
- Pedro Joaquín Chamorro Cardenal
- Salvador Cardenal
- José Adán Aguerri Chamorro
- Rafael Solís
- Edgar Chamorro Coronel
- Miel Noujeim Kasparian

== See also ==
- Education in Nicaragua
- List of Jesuit educational institutions
- List of schools in Nicaragua
