= Radio La Primerísima =

- Managua; Nicaragua
- Frequencies: 91.7 FM, 105.3 FM, 680 AM

Programming
- Language: Spanish

History
- First air date: 1985

Links
- Website: radiolaprimerisima.com

Radio La Primerísima is a pro-government radio station in Nicaragua.

== History and management ==
Radio La Primerísima was founded in 1985. Since 1990, it has been owned by the Nicaraguan Broadcasting Professionals Association (APRANIC), which defined the station's political position as allied to the Sandinista National Liberation Front (FSLN). The director is Tirsa Sáenz, an FSLN loyalist, who succeeded William Grigsby in 2024 or 2025.

== Content ==
Radio La Primerísima's content is considered aligned with the Nicaraguan government, with Confidencial in 2020 describing it as part of Daniel Ortega's "propaganda machine". In 2014, journalist Leonel Laguna was fired after making comments critical of the Ortega government. In 2017, Onda Local, the last politically independent program on the station which had broadcast since 2000, was cancelled. The move was criticized by human rights groups and Onda Local's director Patricia Orozco, who believed the government had ordered the cancellation.
