= Zoilamérica Ortega Murillo =

Nicaraguan politician (born 1967)

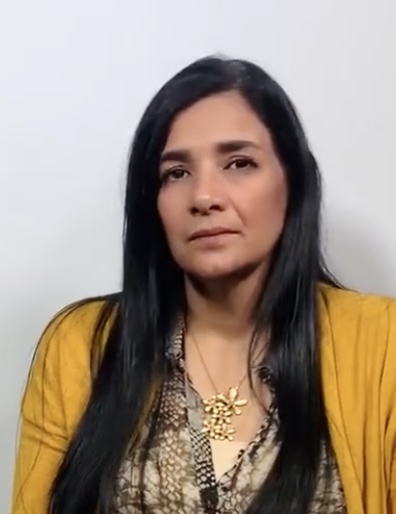
- Zoilamérica in 2019
- Born: Zoilamérica Narváez Murillo; November 13, 1967 (age 58); Managua, Nicaragua
- Education: Central American University
- Parent(s): Jorge Narváez Parajón (biological father); Rosario Murillo (mother)

Zoilamérica Ortega Murillo (née Narváez Murillo) (born November 13, 1967, in Managua) is a Nicaraguan-born consultant for Comunidad Casabierta, an LGBTI rights organisation in Costa Rica. She is also a former member of the National Assembly of Nicaragua.

In 1998, she accused the president of Nicaragua and her stepfather, Daniel Ortega, of sexually abusing her as a child.

== Life ==
Zoilamérica was born in Managua on November 13, 1967, to Rosario Murillo and Jorge Narváez Parajón (m. 1967; d. 1968). In 1977, her mother entered a relationship with Sandinista National Liberation Front leader Daniel Ortega in Costa Rica, where she was traveling with an ex-boyfriend, and where Ortega had entered a self-imposed exile following the revolution against dictator Anastasio Somoza Debayle.

In February 1998, she accused her stepfather, Daniel Ortega, of sexually abusing her as a child beginning in 1978. She recounted her entire experience with Ortega, from her exile under the Somoza regime, her return for the Sandinista Revolution, the literacy crusade, Ortega's 1990 electoral defeat, and her relationship with her mother.

According to her account, April 1989 was the last time that Ortega raped her, through a third party. In September 1990, her mother threw her out of the presidential house during a meltdown. Zoilamérica was recovering from a leg operation. Beginning in the 1990s, Zoilamérica recounted that her sexual harassment by the former president had transitioned to telephone calls and was never physical again.

In her account, she described her experience of abuse by Ortega:

He (Daniel Ortega) ejaculated on my body to avoid the risk of pregnancy, and he continued to do so repeatedly; My mouth, legs, and breasts were the areas where he most frequently spurted his semen, despite my disgust and revulsion. He soiled my body, using it as he pleased, regardless of what I felt or thought. His pleasure was the most important thing; he ignored my pain.

From her exile in Costa Rica, she condemned her stepfather during the 2021 Nicaraguan general election.

== Similar case of sexual abuse related to Ortega ==
Elvia Junieth, exiled with Murillo's family in Miami, also alleged that she was abused by the president in 2005 and, according to the family, a girl was born from that relationship whom Ortega did not acknowledge. Her brother, Santos Sebastián Flores Castillo, died in the Modelo Tipitapa Prison in November 2021.

== In popular culture ==
The 2019 documentary film Exiliada (Exiled) revolves around and interviews her, as well as her complaints of sexual abuse against Ortega in 1998.
