= Gustavo Porras Cortés =

Politician from Nicaragua

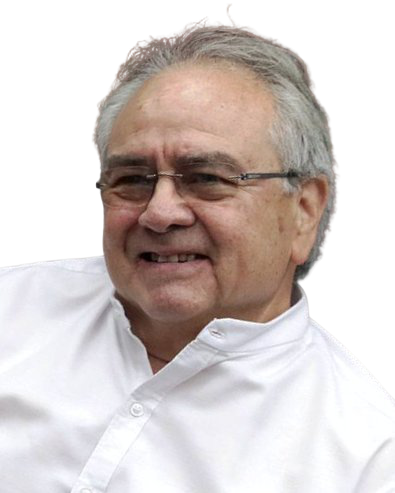
- Porras Cortés in 2022

President of the National Assembly of Nicaragua
- Incumbent
- Assumed office 9 January 2017
- Preceded by: Irís Montenegro

Personal details
- Born: 11 October 1954 (age 71) Managua, Nicaragua
- Party: Sandinista National Liberation Front
- Education: National Autonomous University of Nicaragua at León
- Occupation: Politician, physician, trade unionist

Gustavo Porras Cortés (born 11 October 1954) is a Nicaraguan politician and physician serving as President of the National Assembly of Nicaragua since January 2017.

== Personal life ==
He was born on 11 October 1954 and graduated as general practitioner in National Autonomous University of Nicaragua at León.

== Personal sanctions ==
In 2021, Gustavo Cortes was sanctioned by the European Union making him subject to travel ban and assets freeze in all EU jurisdictions. The decision came about as he was deemed responsible for contributing to the ongoing commission of serious human rights violations and other abuses by the Nicaraguan authorities. In his capacity as the President of the National Assembly, he played an instrumental role in passing repressive laws that undermined democratic processes in the country.
