= René Núñez Téllez =

Nicaraguan politician and Sandinista revolutionary

- Born: Leon, Nicaragua
- Movement: Sandinista National Liberation Front
- Relatives: Carlos Núñez Téllez (brother)

Santos René Núñez Téllez (1946 - 2016) was a Nicaraguan politician. He was a Sandinista revolutionary and later President of the National Assembly of Nicaragua. He became a deputy in the National Assembly in 2002 and served as its President in 2005 and then again from 2007 until his death in 2016.

Born on 1 November 1946 in Leon, Nicaragua, Núñez was the brother of Carlos Núñez; together they joined the Sandinista effort in 1969 and in 1975, René Núñez was sentenced to eight years in prison for his guerilla efforts. After the Sandinistas defeated the Somoza regime in 1979, he took on new roles in the government as well as the Sandinista party (FSLN).

Núñez died September 10, 2016, in San José, Costa Rica, where he was seeking medical care.
