= Rosario Murillo =

Co-President of Nicaragua since 2025

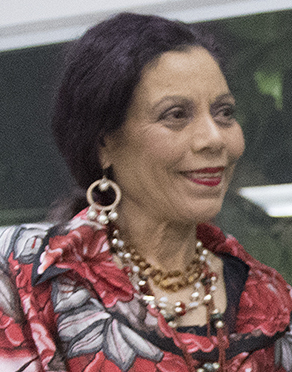
- Murillo in 2017

Co-President of Nicaragua
- Incumbent
- Assumed office 18 February 2025 Serving with Daniel Ortega
- Preceded by: Daniel Ortega (Note: as sole President)

Vice President of Nicaragua
- In office 10 January 2017 – 18 February 2025
- President: Daniel Ortega
- Preceded by: Omar Halleslevens
- Succeeded by: Vacant
Ceremonial titles
First Lady of Nicaragua
Current
Assumed role 10 January 2007 Serving with Daniel Ortega (Note: since 18 February 2025)
President	Daniel Ortega
Preceded by	Lila T. Abaunza
In role 18 July 1979 – 25 April 1990
President	Daniel Ortega
Preceded by	Hope Portocarrero
Succeeded by	Cristiana Chamorro Barrios

Member of the National Assembly
- In office 4 November 1984 – 25 February 1990

Personal details
- Born: Rosario María Murillo Zambrana; 22 June 1951 (age 75) Managua, Nicaragua
- Party: FSLN (1969–present)
- Spouses: Jorge Narváez (m. 1967; died 1968) Moisés Hassan (m. 1968; div. 1972) Carlos Vicente Ibarra (m. 1973; div. 1977) Daniel Ortega (m. 1979)
- Children: 2 with Jorge Narváez, including Zoilamérica Ortega Murillo; 1 with Moisés Hassan; 7 with Daniel Ortega, including Juan Carlos Ortega Murillo
- Relatives: Augusto César Sandino (great uncle); Xiomara Blandino (daughter-in-law)

Rosario María Murillo Zambrana (Latin American Spanish: [roˈsaɾjo muˈɾiʝo]; born 22 June 1951) is a Nicaraguan politician and poet who has been Co-president of Nicaragua alongside her husband, Daniel Ortega, since February 2025. Before this, she served as Vice-President of Nicaragua, the country's second-highest office, from 2017 to 2025, as First Lady of Nicaragua from 2007 to 2025 and from 1985 to 1990, she had been the wife of President Ortega. Her and her husband's rule as dictators over an authoritarian regime.

Murillo has variously served as the Nicaraguan government's lead spokesperson, government minister, head of the Sandinista Association of Cultural Workers, and Communications Coordinator of the Council on Communication and Citizenry. She was sworn in as Vice-President of Nicaragua on 10 January 2017.

The couple has eliminated political freedoms, repressed political opponents, and cemented powers in the hands of the executive. Since becoming Vice President in 2017, the ruling couple have increasingly purged and arrested long-standing loyalists of the regime to prevent a challenge to the ruling couple. In August 2021, she was personally sanctioned by the European Union over human rights violations.

== Early life and education ==
Murillo was born in Managua, Nicaragua. Her father was Teódulo Murillo Molina (1915–1996), a cotton grower and livestock owner. Her mother was Zoilamérica Zambrana Sandino (1926–1973; the daughter of Orlando José Zambrana Báez and Zoilamérica Sandino Tiffer), a niece of General Augusto César Sandino (1895–1934), who fought against the US occupation in Nicaragua. Murillo's maternal grandmother, Zoilamérica Sandino Tiffer, was a paternal half-sister of Augusto Nicolás Calderón Sandino, also known as Augusto César Sandino.

Murillo was schooled at Colegio Teresiano in Managua, a K–12 Catholic, all-girls school, also known as Saint Teresa's Academy. She attended high school at the Greenway Convent Collegiate School in Tiverton, Great Britain, and studied art at the Institut Anglo-Suisse Le Manoir at La Neuveville in Switzerland. Murillo possesses certificates in the English and French languages granted by the University of Cambridge in Great Britain. She also attended the National Autonomous University of Nicaragua in her hometown.

== Sandinista front ==
Murillo joined the Sandinista National Liberation Front in 1969, and provided shelter in her house, which was located in the Barrio San José Oriental in Managua, to Sandinista guerrillas, among them Tomás Borge, one of the founders of the FSLN.

During the early 1970s, Murillo worked for La Prensa as a secretary to two of Nicaragua's leading political and literary figures, Pedro Joaquin Chamorro and Pablo Antonio Cuadra. Murillo was arrested in Estelí in 1976 for her activities in politics. Soon after, she fled and lived for several months in Panama and Venezuela. She later moved to Costa Rica, where she dedicated herself completely to her political work with the FSLN, helped start Radio Sandino, and met her future husband Daniel Ortega. The pair married in a secret ceremony in 1979. When the Sandinistas overthrew the US-backed dictator Anastasio Somoza Debayle in 1979, she returned to Nicaragua. Murillo and Ortega remarried in 2005 in order to have the marriage recognized by the Catholic Church, as part of Ortega's effort to reconcile with the church.

== Early political career ==
Murillo started to gain power politically in 1998 after her daughter, Zoilamérica Ortega Murrillo, accused her stepfather Ortega of sexually abusing her for many years. Murillo defended Ortega and said that the accusations were "a total falsehood" while also publicly shunning her daughter, who has still maintained that her accusations were true. Although Zoilamérica tried to pursue legal action, Ortega had immunity as a member of the National Assembly. The case was thrown out by the Supreme Court in 2001 because the statute of limitations had expired.

Ortega was elected president in 2006 and re-elected in 2011. In the 2016 general election, Murillo ran as Ortega's vice-presidential candidate. She was "widely seen as the power behind the presidency", according to Al Jazeera's Lucia Newman.

During her vice presidency, a series of protests broke out, resulting in 309 deaths by July 2018, with 25 of the casualties being under the age of 17. Murillo and presidential aide Néstor Moncada Lau were sanctioned by the United States as part of an executive order issued by U.S. President Donald Trump on 27 November 2018.

== Co-presidency (2025–present) ==
On 20 November 2024, Ortega unveiled proposals to amend the Nicaraguan constitution in order to extend his term from five years to six and have Murillo declared co-president. The measures passed in a first reading at the National Assembly on 22 November and passed in a second reading on 30 January 2025. The constitutional reform entered into force on 18 February 2025.

== Personal life ==
Murillo has eight children with Daniel Ortega. In addition to her native Spanish, she speaks English, Italian and French. She can also read German. Murillo is a Catholic with strong Marian veneration and is known for her New Age beliefs and practices.

== In popular culture ==
Murillo is featured in the 2019 documentary film Exiled, which revolves around her daughter Zoilamérica's sexual abuse complaints against her husband, Daniel Ortega.

== Published works ==
- Gualtayán (1975)
- Sube a nacer conmigo (1977)
- Un deber de cantar (1981)
- Amar es combatir (antología) (1982)
- En espléndidas ciudades (1985)
- Las esperanzas misteriosas (1990)
- Angel in the deluge (1992) translated from the Spanish by Alejandro Murguía. ISBN 0-87286-274-7

== Notes ==
Honorary titles
Preceded by María Luisa Muñoz; Acting	First Lady of Nicaragua; 1979–1990; Provisional: 1979–1985	Succeeded by Cristiana Chamorro Barrios
Preceded by Lila T. Abaunza	First Lady of Nicaragua; 2007–present Served alongside Daniel Ortega since 2025	Incumbent
Party political offices
Preceded by Omar Halleslevens	FSLN nominee for Vice President of Nicaragua; 2016, 2021	Most recent
Political offices
Preceded by Omar Halleslevens	Vice President of Nicaragua; 2017–2025	Vacant
Preceded by Daniel Ortega New office	Co-president of Nicaragua; 2025–present	Incumbent
