= Supreme Court of Justice of Nicaragua =

Nicaraguan Supreme Court

The Supreme Court of Justice (Spanish: Corte Suprema de Justicia, CSJ) of Nicaragua is the country's highest court. Its president is Alba Luz Ramos and Marvin Aguilar Garcia is vice-president.

In January 2019, Justice Rafael Solis resigned his position on the court in protest of President Daniel Ortega's repression of protests that began in Nicaragua in April 2018. Solis had been an ally of Ortega since fighting in the revolution together in the 1970s, and was a key figure in the October 19, 2009 Supreme Court decision to remove presidential term limits, opening the door to Ortega's reelection in 2011 and again in 2016. Division among opposition on the court also solidified Ortega's support from the court, which found that the term limits violated his civil rights. In his resignation, Solis called the decision a "mistake".

In December 2020, the United States sanctioned Aguilar for "assist[ing] the Ortega regime’s effort to undermine Nicaragua’s democracy."
