= YATAMA =

Former Nicaraguan political party

Sons of Mother Earth Yapti Tasba Masraka Nanih Aslatakanka
- Abbreviation: YATAMA
- Founded: early 1988
- Dissolved: 4 October 2023
- Preceded by: MISURA/KISAN
- Headquarters: Puerto Cabezas
- Ideology: Indigenism; Miskito interests Afro-Nicaraguan; Garifuna interests Regionalism
- National affiliation: United Alliance Nicaragua Triumphs
- Colors: Maroon, green

Yapti Tasba Masraka Nanih Aslatakanka (lit. 'Sons of Mother Earth'; YATAMA) was an Indigenous party mainly active on Nicaragua's Atlantic coast. YATAMA had its roots in the MISURASATA (Miskito, Sumo and Rama Sandinista Alliance) and the MISURA/KISAN organisations. In 1988, in response to the Central American peace accords, the remnants of MISURASATA and MISURA/KISAN in Honduras, Costa Rica and Miami reorganized as YATAMA, united by the traditional Miskitu leaders Steadman Fagoth and Brooklyn Rivera.

YATAMA participated in several regional elections from 1990. Its best electoral result was in the autonomous elections on the Caribbean Coast in 1990 where they won 26 Regional Council member seats (out of 90). The party was in an alliance with the FSLN from 2006 until 2014.

On 4 October 2023, the party had its legal status revoked by the Supreme Electoral Council of Nicaragua merely days after its only representative in the National Assembly, Brooklyn Rivera, was detained by Nicaraguan Police for charges never stated.

No information of Rivera's whereabouts or wellbeing has been made public by the Sandinista government since, despite repeated demands from his exiled daughter, Tininiska Rivera, and human rights organizations. His case has thus been described as an instance of "forced disappearance" by Nicaraguan opposition media and human rights organizations.

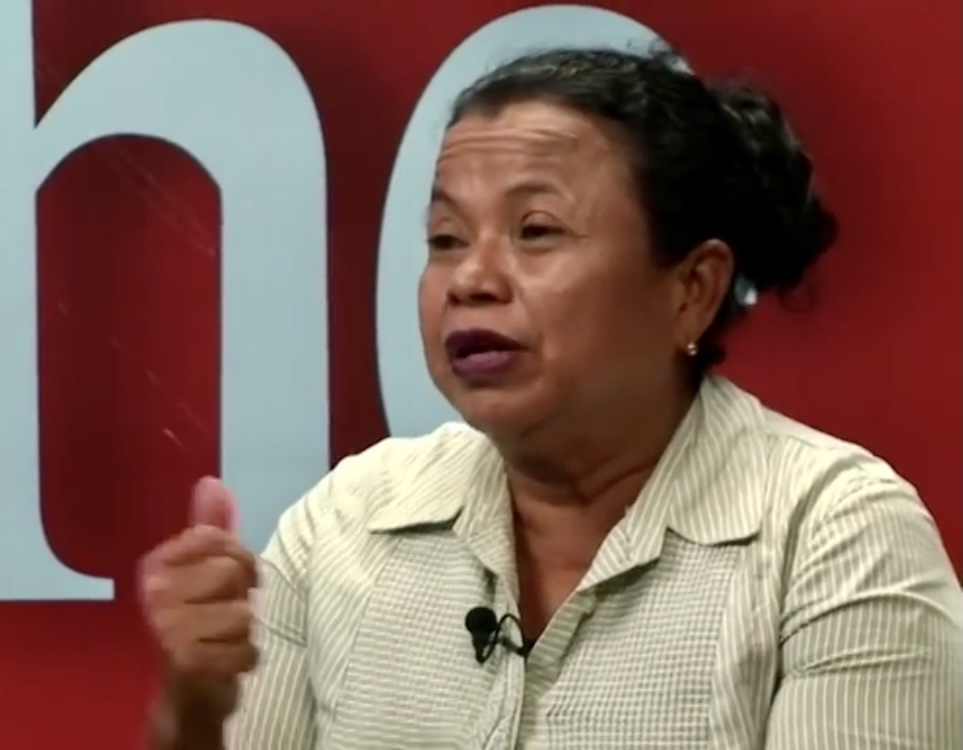
YATAMA regional president Elizabeth Enríquez in 2017

== See also ==
- KISAN
