= National Assembly (Nicaragua) =

Legislative branch of the government of Nicaragua

National Assembly of the Republic of Nicaragua Asamblea Nacional de la República de Nicaragua

Type
- Type: Unicameral

History
- Founded: 10 January 1985

Leadership
- President: Gustavo Porras Cortés, FSLN since January 2017

Structure
- Seats: 90 deputies (Note: 90 of whom are elected by popular vote on a proportional representation basis from party lists: 20 nationally, and 70 representing the country's departments and autonomous regions.)
- Political groups: Government (76): FSLN (76); Opposition (14): PLC (9); ALN (2); YATAMA (1); PLI (1); CCN (1); APRE (1)

Elections
- Voting system: Closed list proportional representation
- Last election: 7 November 2021
- Next election: Cancelled

Meeting place
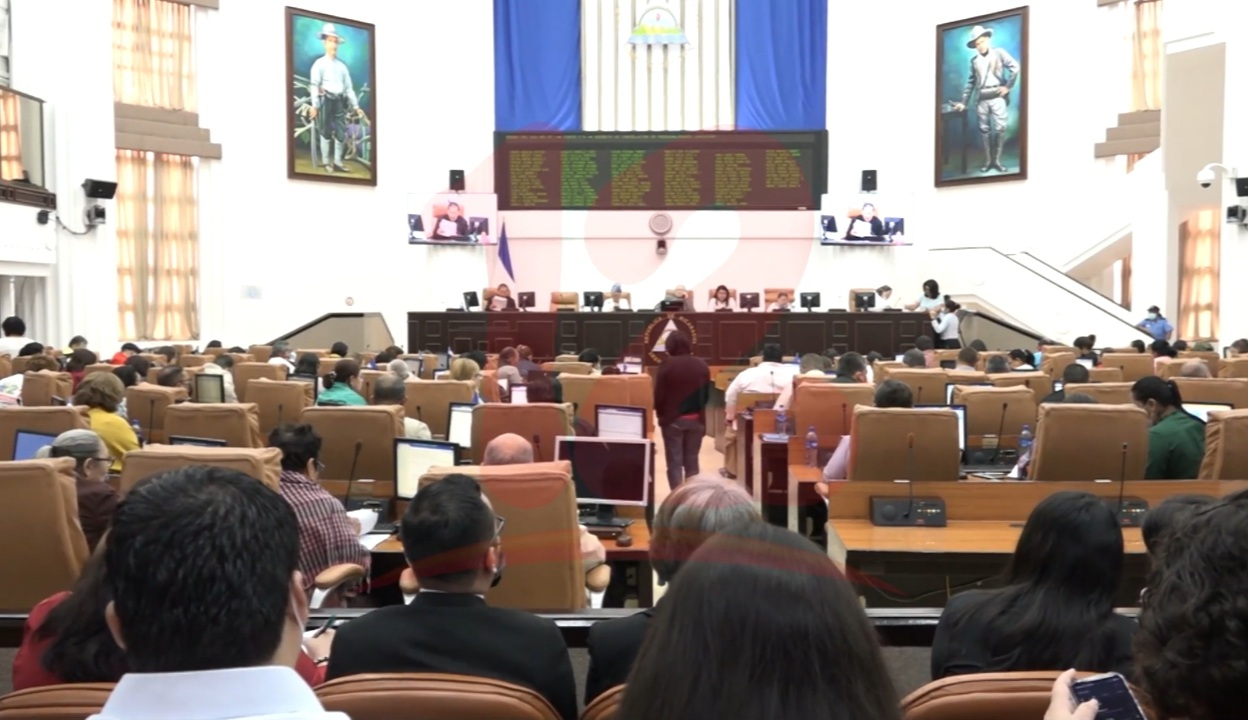
- Complejo Legislativo Carlos Núñez; Calle Cuatro, Managua Nicaragua

Website
- www.asamblea.gob.ni

The National Assembly (Spanish: Asamblea Nacional) is the legislative branch of the government of Nicaragua founded in January 1985.

== History ==
The unicameral National Assembly replaced the bicameral National Congress of Nicaragua which was disbanded following the overthrow of Somoza government in 1979. There was an interim Council of State with 47 and later 51 appointed members from 1980 to 1984. First elections to the National Assembly took place in November 1984, and the first National Assembly took legislative functions from the Junta of National Reconstruction on 10 January 1985.

== Composition ==
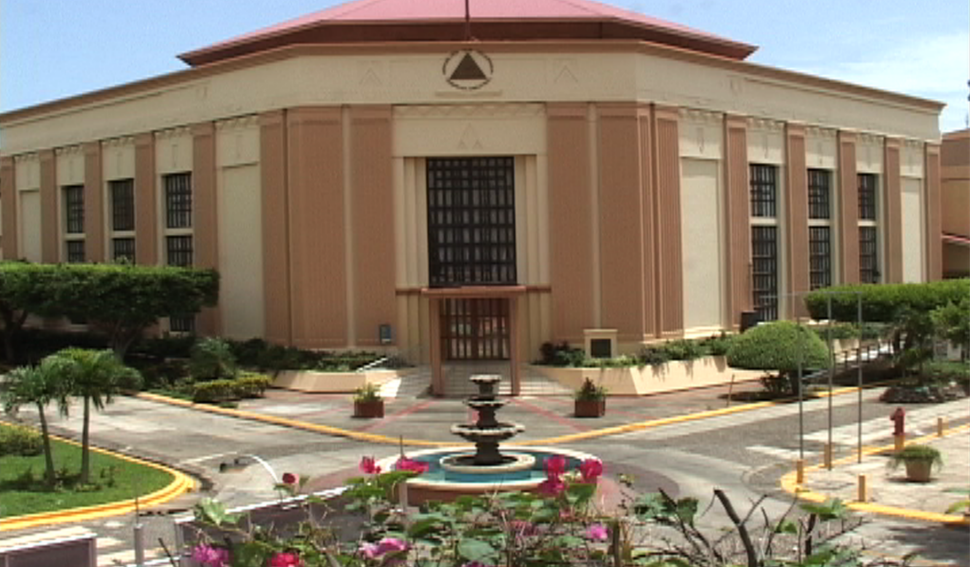

The Nicaraguan legislature is a unicameral body. It is made up of 92 deputies, 90 of whom are elected by popular vote on a proportional representation basis from party lists: 20 nationally, and 70 representing the country's departments and autonomous regions. In addition, the President of the Republic who served the immediately previous presidential term is entitled to sit in the Assembly as a deputy, as is the runner-up in the most recent presidential election. The President and the National Assembly serve concurrent five-year terms.

To be eligible for election to the assembly, candidates must be (Art. 134, Constitution):

- Nicaraguan nationals. If they have held any other nationality, it must have been renounced at least four years prior to the election.
- In full enjoyment of their political and civic rights.
- At least 21 years old.
- Residents of the country for at least four years prior to the election (exemptions are granted to members of the diplomatic corps and employees of international organisations, and to those recently returned from studying abroad).
- Born in the department or autonomous region they hope to represent, or having resided there for at least two years prior to the election.

The following are disqualified from serving in the Assembly:

- Ministers, vice-ministers, and other members of the cabinet, magistrates and judges, and mayors, unless they resign from those positions at least 12 months prior to the election.
- Ministers of any church or religious organization, unless they have relinquished their ministry at least 12 months in advance of the election.

Four months before the 2016 Nicaraguan general election, the Nicaraguan Supreme Court removed PLI leader Eduardo Montealegre, decreeing that Pedro Reyes was the new leader of the PLI. After PLI and allied Sandinista Renovation Movement deputies objected, Nicaragua's Supreme Electoral Council ordered them removed from the National Assembly and empowered Reyes to select their replacements.

== Election results ==
Deputies as of June 21, 2021:

- Adilia del Pilar Salinas Otero
- Alba Estela González Tórrez
- Alejandro Mejía Ferreti
- Alyeris Beldramina Arias Siezar
- Angela Espinoza Tórrez
- Antenor Enrique Urbina Leyva
- Argentina del Socorro Parajón Alejos
- Arling Patricia Alonso Gómez
- Arturo José Valdéz Robleto
- Benita del Carmen Arbizú Medina
- Brooklyn Rivera Bryan
- Byron Rodolfo Jeréz Solis
- Camila del Socorro Mejía Rodríguez
- Carlos Emilio López Hurtado
- Carlos Wilfredo Navarro Moreira
- Delia María Law Blanco
- Digna Lidia Betanco Aguilar
- Dora Elena Rojas
- Doris Zulema García Canales
- Douglas Alemán Benavides
- Edwin Ramón Castro Rivera
- Efren José González Briones
- Enrique Aldana Burgos
- Evelin Patricia Aburto Torres
- Evile del Socorro Umaña Olivas
- Felix Andrés Sandoval Jarquín
- Filiberto Jacinto Rodríguez López
- Florence Ivette Levy Wilson
- Gladis de los Ángeles Báez
- Gloria del Rosario Montenegro
- Gloria María Maradiaga
- Guillermo Eduardo Arce Castaño
- Gustavo Eduardo Porras Cortés
- Haydee Azucena Castillo Barquero
- Heberto Octavio Ruíz Morales
- Irís Marina Montenegro Blandón
- Irma de Jesús Dávila Lazo
- Jenny Azucena Martínez Gómez
- Jimmy Harold Blandón Rubio
- Johanna del Carmen Luna Lira
- José Antonio Zepeda López
- José Ramón Sarria Morales
- José Santos Figueroa Aguilar
- José Santos López Gómez
- Josefina Roa Romero
- Juan Ramón Jiménez
- Juan Ramón Meza Romero
- Juan Ramón Obregón Valdivia
- Juana Isaura Chavarría Salgado
- Justo Armando Peña Aviles
- Laura Estela Bermúdez Robleto
- Lester Adrián Villareal Pérez
- Ligia María Arauz Pavón
- Loria Raquel Dixon Brautigam
- Lucina Leonor Paz Rodríguez
- Luis Coronel Cuadra
- Luis Manuel Velásquez Manzanares
- María Agustina Montenegro López
- María Auxiliadora Martínez Corrales
- María Haydee Osuna Ruíz
- María Jilma Rosales Espinoza
- Mario José Asensio Florez
- Mario Valle Dávila
- Maritza del Socorro Espinales
- Martha Rosa Navarrete Mendoza
- Maryinis Ibet Vallejoz Chavarría
- Mauricio Orué Vásquez
- Maximino Rodríguez Martínez
- Melba del Socorro Sánchez Suárez
- Melvin Martín Agurcia Perrott
- Miguel Anselmo Rosales Ortega
- Milciades Adrian Martínez Rodríguez
- Mirta Mercedes Carrión Cano
- Nallirys Aragón Cantillano
- Násser Sebastián Silwany Baéz
- Osorno Cóleman Salomón
- Patricia Mercedes Sánchez Urbina
- Pedro Antonio Haslam Mendoza
- Pedro Joaquín Treminio Mendoza
- Perla Soledad Castillo Quintero
- Reynaldo Altamirano Alaníz
- Roberto José Lira Villalobos
- Rosa Argentina Navarro Sánchez
- Rosa Herminia Irías Figueroa
- Rubén de Jesús Gómez Suárez
- Ruth de Jesús Molina Flores
- Ruth del Socorro Cerda Acosta
- Santiago José Martínez Lacayo
- Walmart Antonio Gutiérrez Mercado
- Walter Eden Espinoza Fernández
- Wendy María Guido

== Parliamentary groups ==
The deputies are organized in Parliamentary Groups (bancadas). The current number of deputies of the parliamentary political parties is:

- Sandinista National Liberation Front (FSLN): 71 deputies
- Constitutionalist Liberal Party (PLC): 14 deputies
- Independent Liberal Party (PLI): 2 deputies
- Nicaraguan Liberal Alliance (ALN): 2 deputies
- Conservative Party (PC): 1 deputy
- Alliance for the Republic (APRE): 1 deputy
- YATAMA: 1 deputy

== See also ==
- List of presidents of the National Assembly of Nicaragua
- National Congress of Nicaragua - Former bicameral legislature until 1979
- President of the Council of State of Nicaragua - Presidents of the interim legislature from 1980 to 1984
- Politics of Nicaragua
- List of legislatures by country
- List of political parties in Nicaragua
