= List of political parties in Nicaragua =

This article lists political parties in Nicaragua.

== Political culture ==
Historically, Nicaragua had a two-party system, with varying two dominant political parties. The 2006 general election could have marked the end of the bipartite scheme, as the anti-Sandinista forces split into two major political alliances: the Nicaraguan Liberal Alliance (ALN) and the Constitutionalist Liberal Party (PLC).

== Parties ==
=== Major parties ===
Three parties and alliances currently hold seats in the National Assembly:

Party	Abbr.	Founded	Ideology	Political position	Deputies	PARLACEN
Sandinista National Liberation Front; Frente Sandinista de Liberación Nacional	FSLN	1961	Sandinismo	Left-wing to far-left	75 / 92	15 / 20
Constitutionalist Liberal Party; Partido Liberal Constitucionalista	PLC	1968	Conservatism	Centre-right to right-wing	9 / 92	2 / 20
Independent Liberal Party; Partido Liberal Independiente	PLI	1944	Liberalism	Centre-right	2 / 92	1 / 20
Nicaraguan Liberal Alliance; Alianza Liberal Nicaragüense	ALN	2005	Conservative liberalism	Centre-right	1 / 92	1 / 20
Alliance for the Republic; Alianza por la República	APRE	2004	Liberal conservativism	Centre-right	1 / 92	1 / 20

=== Other parties ===
- Alternative for Change (AC) a
- Autonomous Liberal Party (PAL) a
- Christian Unity Movement (MUC) a
- Nationalist Liberal Party (PLN) a
- Nicaraguan Resistance Party (PRN) a

a = active

=== Defunct parties or parties with no legal status ===
- Central American Unionist Party (PUCA) a
- Christian Alternative Party (AC)
- Christian Democratic Union (UDC) a
- Communist Party of Nicaragua (PCdeN) a
- Conservative Action Movement (MAC)
- Conservative Alliance (ALCON) a
- Democratic Conservative Party (PCD)
- Democratic Party of National Confidence (PDCN)
- Ecologist Green Party of Nicaragua (PVEN) a
- Great Liberal Union (GUL)
- Independent Liberal Party for National Unity (PLIUN) a
- Liberal Salvation Movement (MSL)
- Marxist-Leninist Popular Action Movement (MAP-ML) a
- National Action Party (PAN)
- National Conservative Action (ANC)
- National Conservative Unity Party (PUNC)
- National Convergence
- National Democratic Party (PND)
- National Project (PRONAL)
- National Unity Movement (MUN) a
- New Liberal Party (PALI) a
- Nicaraguan Democratic Movement (MDN) a
- Nicaraguan Party of the Christian Path (CCN) a
- Nicaraguan Socialist Party (PSN) a
- Party for Citizen Action (PAC) a
- Popular Conservative Alliance (APC) a
- Popular Social Christian Party (PPSC)
- Revolutionary Unity Movement (MUR)
- Revolutionary Workers' Party (PRT)
- Social Christian Party (PSC) a
- Sandinista Renovation Movement (MRS) a
- Social Conservative Party (PSC)
- Social Democratic Party (PSD) a
- Unity Alliance (AU)
- UNO-96 Alliance (UNO-96)
- Up with the Republic a
- Yapti Tasba Masraka Nanih Aslatakanka a

a = active

=== Regional Parties ===
- Authentic Costeño Autonomy Movement (MAAC)
- Coast Alliance (Alianza Costeña)
- Coast People’s Party (PPC)
- Costeño Democratic Alliance (ADECO)
- Multiethnic Indigenous Party (PIM) a
- Multiethnic Party for Coast Unity (PAMUC) a
- Progressive Indigenous Movement Party of the Moskitia (Moskitia Pawanka) a
- Yapti Tasba Masraka Nanih Aslatakanka (YATAMA)
- Yapti Tasba Masraka Raya Nani Movement Party (Myatamaran) a

a = active

=== Historical ===
Party	Abbr.	Ideology	Political position	Leader	Years active
Democratic Party; Partido Democrático	PD	Liberalism (Nicaraguan)	Before 1893: Left-wing; 1893–1909: Centre-left; After 1909: Big tent (Note: After 1909, the Democratic Party was divided into pro-American right-wing liberals (such as those who later formed the base for the Somoza dynasty) and anti-imperialist left-wing liberals (such as the forces led by Augusto César Sandino).)	Patricio Rivas; Laureano Pineda; William Walker; José Santos Zelaya; José María Moncada; Juan Bautista Sacasa	1838–1928
Nationalist Liberal Party; Partido Liberal Nacionalista	PLN	Nominal: Liberalism (Nicaraguan); National liberalism; De facto: Authoritarian conservatism; National conservatism; Pro-Americanism; Personalismo; Somocismo	Right-wing to far-right	Anastasio Somoza García (first); Anastasio Somoza Debayle (last)	1928–1979
Legitimist Party; Partido Legitimista	PL	Conservatism (Nicaraguan)	Right-wing	José Chamorro Argüello; José Núñez; Pablo Buitrago y Benavente; Norberto Ramírez; Fruto Chamorro	1823–1851
Conservative Party; Partido Conservador	PC	Conservatism (Nicaraguan); Christian democracy; Social conservatism; National conservatism	Right-wing	Alfredo César Aguirre	1851–2021

- National Opposition Union (UNO), founded 1966
- National Opposition Union (UNO), founded 1990
- Republican Party (Partido Republicano, PR)
- Traditional Conservative Party (Partido Conservador Tradicionalista, PCT)

=== Popular subscription associations ===
- Civic Association of Potosí (ACP)
- Sol Association (Asociación Sol)
- Viva Managua Movement (Movimiento Viva Managua)

== See also ==
- Politics of Nicaragua
- United Alliance Nicaragua Triumphs
