= 1996 Nicaraguan general election =

- 20 October 1996
- Presidential election
- Turnout: 76.39% (▼9.84pp)
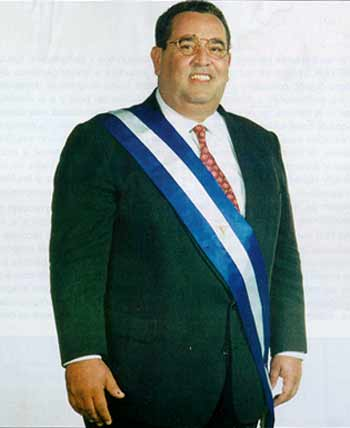

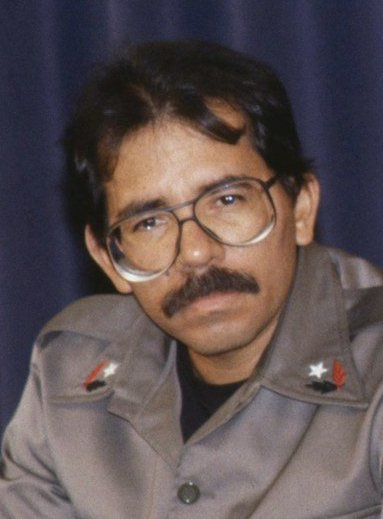
Candidate	Arnoldo Alemán	Daniel Ortega
Party	Liberal Alliance	FSLN
Running mate	Enrique Bolaños	Juan Manuel Caldera
Popular vote	896,207	664,909
Percentage	50.99%	37.83%
- Results by department
President before election
Violeta Chamorro
Independent
Elected President
Arnoldo Alemán
PLC
- Parliamentary election
- 90 of the 93 seats in the National Assembly; 46 seats needed for a majority
Party	Leader	Vote %	Seats	+/–
Liberal Alliance (Note: Coalition of the Constitutionalist Liberal Party, Independent Liberal Party for National Unity, Nationalist Liberal Party and Neoliberal Party)	Arnoldo Alemán	45.97	42	New
FSLN	Daniel Ortega	36.46	35	−4
CCN	Guillermo Osorno	3.72	3	New
PRONAL	Benjamín Lanzas	2.37	2	New
Conservative	Noel Vidaurre	2.13	2	
MRS	Sergio Ramírez	1.33	1	New
PRN	Edgar Quiñónez	1.23	1	New
Unity Alliance (Note: Coalition of the Social Christian Party, Social Democratic Party and Revolutionary Unity Movement)	Alejandro Serrano	0.82	1	New
PLI	Virgilio Godoy	0.73	1	
UNO-96	Alfredo César Aguirre	0.62	1	New
APC	Miriam Argüello	0.39	1	−4
This lists parties that won seats. See the complete results below.
President of the National Assembly before	President of the National Assembly after
Cairo Manuel López; UDC	Iván Escobar; PLC

General elections were held in Nicaragua on 20 October 1996 to elect the president and the members of the National Assembly. Arnoldo Alemán of the Liberal Alliance (a coalition of the Constitutionalist Liberal Party, Independent Liberal Party for National Unity, Nationalist Liberal Party and Neoliberal Party) was elected president, with the Liberal Alliance also winning 42 of the 93 seats in the National Assembly.

== Results ==
=== President ===
Candidate	Party	Votes	%
Arnoldo Alemán	Liberal Alliance	896,207	50.99
Daniel Ortega	Sandinista National Liberation Front	664,909	37.83
Guillermo Antonio Osorno Molina	Nicaraguan Party of the Christian Path	71,908	4.09
Noel José Vidaurre Argüello	Conservative Party	39,983	2.27
Benjamin Ramón Lanzas Selva	National Project	9,265	0.53
Sergio Ramírez	Sandinista Renovation Movement	7,665	0.44
Francisco José Mayorga Balladares	Bread and Strength Alliance (PAN–ASR)	7,102	0.40
Francisco José Duarte Tapia	National Conservative Action	6,178	0.35
Edgar Enrique Quiñónes Tuckler	Nicaraguan Resistance Party	5,813	0.33
Andrés Abelino Robles Pérez	Nicaraguan Workers, Peasants and Professionals Unity Party	5,789	0.33
Virgilio Godoy	Independent Liberal Party	5,692	0.32
Jorge Alberto Díaz Cruz	National Justice Party	5,582	0.32
Alejandro Serrano Caldera	Unity Alliance	4,873	0.28
Elí Altamirano	Communist Party of Nicaragua	4,802	0.27
Miriam Argüello	Popular Conservative Alliance	4,632	0.26
Ausberto Narváez Argüello	Liberal Unity Party	3,887	0.22
Alfredo César Aguirre	UNO–96 Alliance (PND–MAC–MDN)	3,664	0.21
Allan Antonio Tefel Alba	National Renovation Movement	2,641	0.15
James Odnith Webster Pitts	Democratic Action Party	1,895	0.11
Sergio Abilio Mendieta Castillo	Central American Integrationist Party	1,653	0.09
Moisés Hassán	Renovating Action Movement	1,393	0.08
Gustavo Ernesto Tablada Zelaya	Nicaraguan Socialist Party	1,352	0.08
Roberto Urcuyo Muñoz	Nicaraguan Democratic Party	890	0.05
Total		1,757,775	100.00
Valid votes		1,757,775	95.05
Invalid/blank votes		91,587	4.95
Total votes		1,849,362	100.00
Registered voters/turnout		2,421,067	76.39
Source: Nohlen

=== National Assembly ===
Party	National			Departmental			Total seats
Party	Votes	%	Seats	Votes	%	Seats	Total seats
Liberal Alliance	789,533	45.97	9	781,068	45.25	33	42
Sandinista National Liberation Front (Note: Awarded an additional seat for the party's unsuccessful presidential candidate. Vice presidential candidate Juan Manuel Caldera took the seat.)	629,178	36.64	8	629,939	36.49	27	36
Nicaraguan Party of the Christian Path (Note: Awarded an additional seat for the party's unsuccessful presidential candidate.)	63,867	3.72	1	63,986	3.71	2	4
National Project	40,656	2.37	1	36,417	2.11	1	2
Conservative Party (Note: Awarded an additional seat for the party's unsuccessful presidential candidate.)	36,543	2.13	1	39,153	2.27	1	3
Sandinista Renovation Movement	22,789	1.33	0	23,554	1.36	1	1
Nicaraguan Resistance Party	21,068	1.23	0	27,970	1.62	1	1
Unity Alliance	14,001	0.82	0	13,848	0.80	1	1
Independent Liberal Party	12,459	0.73	0	13,697	0.79	1	1
UNO–96 Alliance (PND–MAC–MDN)	10,706	0.62	0	12,720	0.74	1	1
National Conservative Action	9,811	0.57	0	13,011	0.75	0	0
National Action Party	9,724	0.57	0	12,016	0.70	0	0
National Justice Party	8,155	0.47	0	8,527	0.49	0	0
Liberal Unity Party	7,531	0.44	0	9,893	0.57	0	0
Popular Conservative Alliance	6,726	0.39	0	6,335	0.37	1	1
Communist Party of Nicaragua	6,360	0.37	0	6,970	0.40	0	0
Nicaraguan Workers, Peasants and Professionals Unity Party	5,641	0.33	0	5,067	0.29	0	0
Democratic Action Party	5,272	0.31	0	6,254	0.36	0	0
National Renovation Movement	4,988	0.29	0	3,788	0.22	0	0
Nicaraguan Socialist Party	2,980	0.17	0	3,228	0.19	0	0
Central American Integrationist Party	2,834	0.17	0	2,406	0.14	0	0
Marxist–Leninist Popular Action Movement	2,446	0.14	0	520	0.03	0	0
Renovating Action Movement	2,418	0.14	0	2,992	0.17	0	0
Nicaraguan Democratic Alliance	1,730	0.10	0	2,060	0.12	0	0
Social Democratic Party				724	0.04	0	0
Total	1,717,416	100.00	20	1,726,143	100.00	70	93
Valid votes	1,717,416	93.81		1,726,143	93.85		
Invalid/blank votes	113,391	6.19		113,169	6.15		
Total votes	1,830,807	100.00		1,839,312	100.00		
Registered voters/turnout	2,421,067	75.62		2,421,067	75.97		
Source: Nohlen, Election Passport

==== By region ====
Region	AL	FSLN	PCCN	Other
Boaco	57.19%	21.03%	4.59%	17.19%
Carazo	40.02%	39.39%	4.08%	16.51%
Chinandega	36.20%	45.72%	3.28%	14.79%
Chontales	63.76%	19.05%	0.96%	16.23%
Esteli	40.66%	45.78%	2.65%	10.91%
Granada	48.00%	32.92%	2.82%	16.26%
Jinotega	53.40%	28.24%	4.74%	13.62%
Leon	35.79%	46.06%	5.10%	13.05%
Madriz	37.08%	41.64%	2.10%	19.18%
Managua	43.95%	39.87%	4.70%	11.48%
Masaya	43.48%	34.98%	4.00%	17.53%
Matagalpa	49.29%	31.20%	4.40%	15.11%
Nueva Segovia	36.44%	42.80%	1.62%	19.14%
RAAN	50.50%	29.31%	1.12%	19.06%
RAAS	57.06%	28.81%	1.29%	12.85%
Rio San Juan	47.22%	31.15%	3.25%	18.38%
Rivas	44.65%	34.27%	3.48%	17.60%
Source: Constituency Level Elections Archive
