= Arnoldo Alemán =

President of Nicaragua from 1997 to 2002

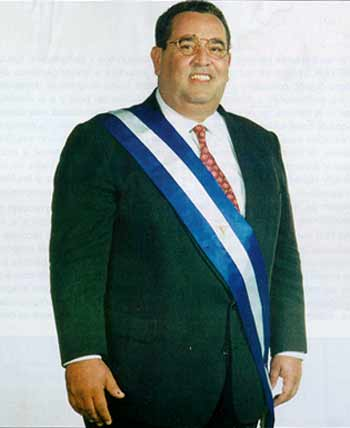
- Official portrait, 1997

President of Nicaragua
- In office 10 January 1997 – 10 January 2002
- Vice President: Enrique Bolaños (1997–2000); Leopoldo Navarro (2000–2002)
- Preceded by: Violeta Chamorro
- Succeeded by: Enrique Bolaños

President of the National Assembly of Nicaragua
- In office 9 January 2002 – 19 September 2002
- Preceded by: Óscar Moncada
- Succeeded by: Jaime Cuadra Somarriba

Mayor of Managua
- In office 26 April 1990 – 20 September 1995
- Preceded by: Carlos Carrión Cruz
- Succeeded by: Roberto Cedeño

Personal details
- Born: José Arnoldo Alemán Lacayo; 23 January 1946 (age 80) Managua, Nicaragua
- Party: Constitutionalist Liberal Party (until 2021)
- Spouse: María Fernanda Flores Lanzas
- Education: National Autonomous University of Nicaragua

José Arnoldo Alemán Lacayo (born 23 January 1946) is a Nicaraguan politician who served as the president of Nicaragua from 10 January 1997 to 10 January 2002. His tenure as president was marked by corruption and attempts to centralize power.

In 2003, he was convicted of corruption and sentenced to a 20-year prison term; the conviction was overturned by the Supreme Court of Nicaragua in 2009. Following his predecessor Violeta Chamorro's death, Alemán is the only living former President of Nicaragua.

== Early life ==
Alemán was born in Managua and received his early education at the La Salle institute in Managua. His father was a prominent lawyer who was an associate of the 1970s Nicaraguan dictator Anastasio Somoza Debayle and served as Somoza's minister of education for a period, and the family owned a large coffee plantation south of Managua.

In 1967 he graduated with a law degree from the Universidad Nacional Autónoma de Nicaragua-León with specializations in regional economic integration and financial law. Between 1968 and 1979, he worked as a lawyer in the commercial and banking world. He became an official in the government of Anastasio Somoza Debayle. In 1980 he was arrested by the Sandinista junta, had some of his property seized and spent nine months in prison. The period of his arrest coincided with the death of his father. This kept him from attending his father's funeral. After he was released from prison, he spent some time in the United States.

Upon his return to Nicaragua, Alemán became heavily involved in business, political, and academic activities. He was a member of the Consejo Superior de la Empresa Privada (COSEP, 1988–1990), vice-president of the Unión de Productores Agropecuarios de Nicaragua (UPANIC, 1986–1990). He was president of the Asociación de Cafetaleros de Managua (1983–1990); the Unión de Cafetaleros de Nicaragua (UNCAFENIC, 1986–1990); the Federación de Municipios de América Central (1992–1993) and of the Federación Municipal de Ciudades de Centroamérica (1993–1995). He also took part in conferences at Tulane University and at Florida International University in the United States.

== Political career ==
In the early 1990s he became mayor of Managua after serving for two months as a councillor in Managua. He was popular due to his urban renewal projects which helped spruce up the city, severely damaged and never rebuilt after a 1972 earthquake. He became known as "El Gordo" ("The Fat Man").

Alemán became president of the Liberal Alliance and helped to resurrect it. Besides the PLC, other members of this alliance were the Partidos Neoliberal (PALI), Liberal Independiente de Unidad Nacional (PLIUN) and the Liberal Nacionalista (PLN). On 1 September 1995 he resigned as mayor in order to be able, under Nicaraguan law, to stand as a candidate in the forthcoming presidential election.

=== Presidency ===
Presidential styles of Arnoldo Alemán
- Reference style: El Honorable Arnoldo Alemán, Presidente de la República de Nicaragua The Honorable Arnoldo Aleman, President of the Republic of Nicaragua
- Spoken style: Presidente Alemán President Aleman
- Alternative style: Señor Presidente Mister President

In 1996 he campaigned for president as the Liberal Alliance's candidate under a strong anti-Sandinista platform. It is reported that unidentified individuals attempted to shoot Alemán, killing one of his bodyguards in the process. He defeated Daniel Ortega, the Sandinista leader, by 48% of the vote to Ortega's 40%. Many claimed widespread election fraud and Ortega refused to concede.

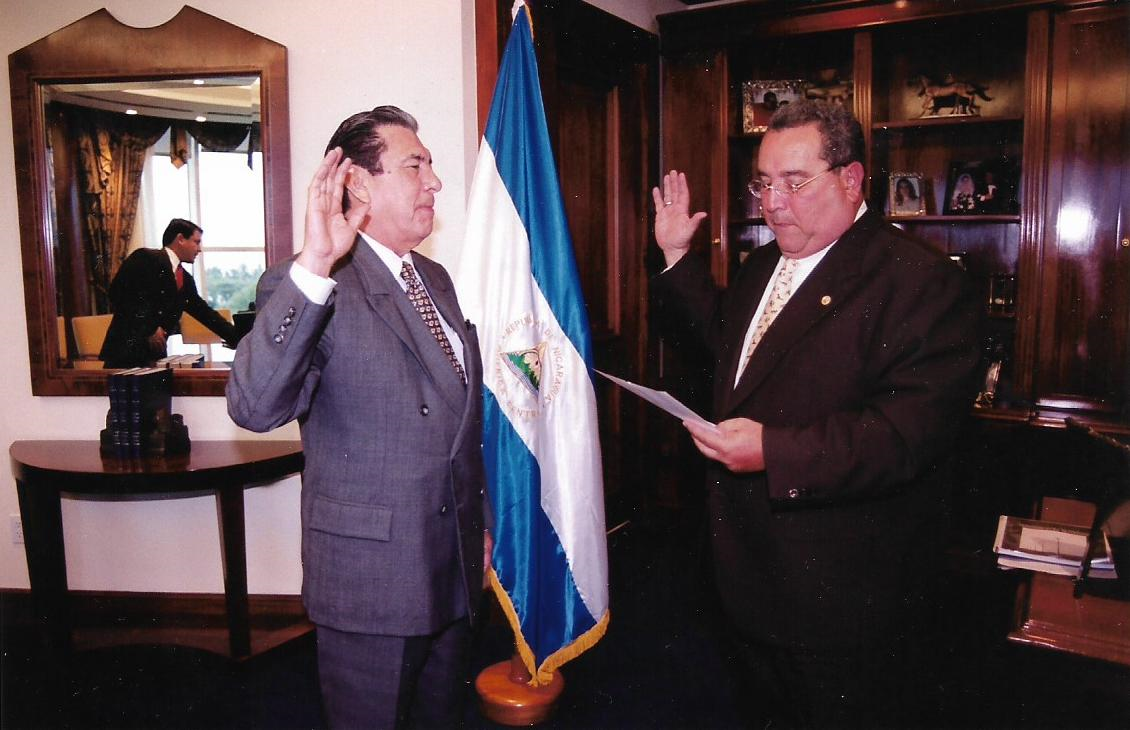
Alemán (right) in 2001

Alemán was successful in promoting economic recovery with reduced inflation and growth of GDP. Foreign investment grew during his administration, which helped to improve Nicaragua's infrastructure. Under his slogan of "Obras, no palabras!" ("Actions, not words"), Alemán directed a comprehensive reconstruction of the roadway system throughout Nicaragua. In the 1980s roads had deteriorated to the point that many were little more than sparsely paved dirt trails. Alemán also created a program to build schools throughout Nicaragua in some of the poorest regions.

He has participated in international conferences and awards given to him include the Orden Nacional al Mérito of the Colombian government and the Orden de Isabel la Católica of the Spanish government.

His first wife, Maria Dolores Cardenal Vargas died of cancer in 1989. Alemán has two sons and two daughters by his first wife. On 23 October 1999, ten years after the death of his first wife, he married Maria Fernanda Flores Lanzas, with whom he has two daughters and a son.

Alemán, constitutionally barred from another term, was succeeded by his vice president, Enrique Bolaños.

== Electoral history ==
=== Elections for mayor of Managua 1990 ===
Managua mayor elected by acclamation of the Managua City Council 26 April 1990.

Alemán, a lawyer by profession, was one of the 20 councilors of the National Opposition Union (UNO), elected for a term of six years in general elections and municipals of 25 February 1990. Of these 20 councilors, 16 belonged to the UNO, and the other 4 the Sandinista National Liberation Front. Subsequently, at its first session, the city council chose from among its members Alemán the mayor of Managua, and engineer Roberto Cedeño Borgen as vice mayor.

=== Presidential election results, 20 October 1996 ===
Candidate	Party	Votes	%
Arnoldo Alemán	Liberal Alliance	896,207	50.99
Daniel Ortega	Sandinista National Liberation Front	664,909	37.83
Guillermo Antonio Osorno Molina	Nicaraguan Party of the Christian Path	71,908	4.09
Noel José Vidaurre Argüello	Conservative Party of Nicaragua	39,983	2.27
Benjamin Ramón Lanzas Selva	National Project	9,265	0.53
Sergio Ramírez	Sandinista Renovation Movement	7,665	0.44
Francisco José Mayorga Balladares	Bread and Strength Alliance (PAN–ASR)	7,102	0.40
Francisco José Duarte Tapia	National Conservative Action	6,178	0.35
Edgar Enrique Quiñónes Tuckler	Nicaraguan Resistance Party	5,813	0.33
Andrés Abelino Robles Pérez	Nicaraguan Workers, Peasants and Professionals Unity Party	5,789	0.33
Virgilio Godoy	Independent Liberal Party	5,692	0.32
Jorge Alberto Díaz Cruz	National Justice Party	5,582	0.32
Alejandro Serrano Caldera	Unity Alliance	4,873	0.28
Elí Altamirano	Communist Party of Nicaragua	4,802	0.27
Miriam Argüello	Popular Conservative Alliance	4,632	0.26
Ausberto Narváez Argüello	Liberal Unity Party	3,887	0.22
Alfredo César Aguirre	UNO-96 Alliance (PND–MAC–MDN)	3,664	0.21
Allan Antonio Tefel Alba	National Renovation Movement	2,641	0.15
James Odnith Webster Pitts	Democratic Action Party	1,895	0.11
Sergio Abilio Mendieta Castillo	Central American Integrationist Party	1,653	0.09
Moisés Hassan	Renovating Action Movement	1,393	0.08
Gustavo Ernesto Tablada Zelaya	Nicaraguan Socialist Party	1,352	0.08
Roberto Urcuyo Muñoz	Nicaraguan Democratic Party	890	0.05
Invalid/blank votes		91,587	–
Total		1,849,362	100
Registered voters/turnout		2,421,067	76.39
Source: Nohlen

=== Presidential election results, 6 November 2011 ===
Candidate	Party/Alliance	Votes	%
Daniel Ortega	Sandinista National Liberation Front (FSLN)	1,569,287	62.46
Fabio Gadea Mantilla	Independent Liberal Party (PLI)	778,889	31.00
José Arnoldo Alemán Lacayo	Constitutionalist Liberal Party (PLC)	148,507	5.91
Edgar Enrique Quiñónez Tuckler	Nicaraguan Liberal Alliance (ALN)	10,003	0.40
Róger Antonio Guevara Mena	Alliance for the Republic (APRE)	5,898	0.23
Total valid votes		2,512,584	100.00

== Corruption charges and conviction ==
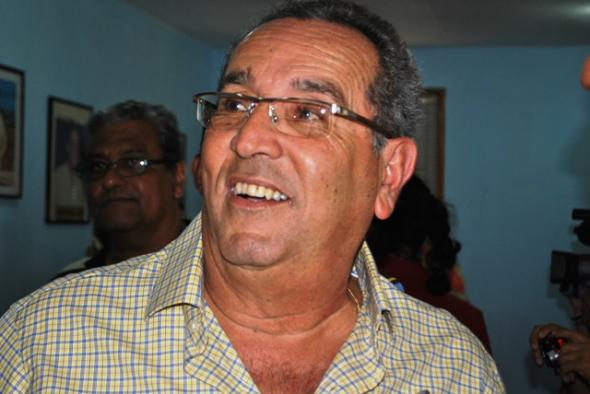
Alemán before 2012

Allegations emerged that Alemán had concealed massive corruption in his administration. At the end of his presidency, public information about alleged corruption committed under his government became available.

Bolaños accused Alemán of widespread corruption in the Alemán administration. The scheme was reported to have involved several members of Arnoldo Alemán's closest family, including a brother and sister. Ex–ministers and close friends were also charged, some of whom fled the country. However, one of the central figures in the corruption plot, the former chief of the Department of Taxes Byron Jeréz, was imprisoned "on the basis of another charge of corruption. All in all, fourteen persons were charged." Several foreign governments froze Alemán's bank accounts in their countries and threatened to confiscate the funds. In such cases, his defense was to claim that the funds were not stolen, but that they came from his coffee plantations.

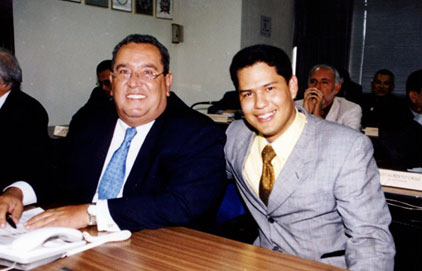
Alemán with Carlos Mayorga in 2009

Alemán was formally charged in December 2002, and on 7 December 2003 he was sentenced to a 20-year prison term for a string of crimes including money laundering, embezzlement and corruption. During his trial, prosecutors produced evidence showing that he and his wife had made extremely large charges to government credit cards, "including a $13,755 bill for the Ritz Carlton hotel in Bali and $68,506 for hotel expenses and handicrafts in India." In addition prosecutors alleged that on top of the $30,878 he spent at the Taj Mahal Hotel in India during a vacation, in Cairo in 1999, he charged $22,530 at a carpet shop, and in August that year, charged $3,867 at the Biltmore Hotel in Coral Gables, Florida, for his engagement party. He also used $25,955 for a honeymoon trip to Italy after his wedding. All of these expenses, along with others, contributed to the growing concerns about the political corruption scandals in Nicaragua, a nation where the average citizen earned about $430 a year. Because of health problems, he had been serving his prison term under house arrest. He was also barred from entering the United States. In 2004, Transparency International named him the ninth most corrupt leader in recent history, estimating that he had looted the country of $100 million in state funds to Panamanian bank accounts controlled by him and his family and then funneled some of the money to his party's candidates affiliates.

Meanwhile, following his presidency, Alemán developed a strategic alliance with Daniel Ortega to rule without effective opposition by offering employment in public offices and other privileges to key members of the Sandinista party, in order to stabilize the country. There are those who claim that the main purpose of this agreement, which led to a constitutional reform, was to distribute the institutions of the state in proportion to the power managed by the two main political parties of the country.

On 16 January 2009, Nicaraguan Supreme Court justices and Chief Justice Manuel Martinez overturned the 20-year corruption sentence against former President Arnoldo Alemán. The decision generated some controversy: "stunned opposition lawmakers immediately suspected a secret deal between Mr. Alemán, ranked one of the world's 10 most corrupt leaders ever by Transparency International, and Daniel Ortega, President of Nicaragua and leader of the Sandinista Party, who wields considerable influence and control over the courts. "He's handing over the National Assembly in exchange for his personal liberty", said Congressman Enrique Saenz. Mr. Alemán, who denies the allegation, said, "Justice has finally been served"."

The following president, Enrique Bolaños, who served under Aleman as his vice president, succeeded him in January, pledging to clean up the corruption in the nation's government, which put him at odds with his predecessor and his administration.

On 9 November 2020, the United States Department of State put Alemán on a list of corrupt foreign officials and also barred his family from entering the country.

== Bibliography ==
- Anderson, Leslie "The Authoritarian Executive? Horizontal and Vertical Accountability in A New Democracy: A Nicaraguan Perspective," Latin American Politics and Society Vol. 48, No. 2 (Summer 2006), 141-69.
- Close, David and Kalowatie Deonandan. eds. 2004. Undoing Democracy: The Politics of Electoral Caudillismo. Lanham: Lexington Books.
- Kampwirth, Karen. 2003. "Arnoldo Alemán Takes on the NGOs: Antifeminism and the New Populism in Nicaragua" Latin American Politics and Society Vol. 45. No. 2. (Summer). pp. 133–158.
- McConnell, Shelley A. "Nicaragua's Turning Point," Current History (February 2007), 83-88.
- Rogers, Tim (2 May 2007). "Why Nicaragua's Caged Bird Sings". Time. Archived from the original on 30 September 2007.

Political offices
Preceded by Violeta Barrios de Chamorro	President of Nicaragua; 10 January 1997–10 January 10, 2002	Succeeded by Enrique Bolaños
Preceded by Carlos Carrión Cruz	Mayor of Managua; 1990–1995	Succeeded by Roberto Cedeño
