= 2011 Nicaraguan general election =

- 6 November 2011
- Presidential election
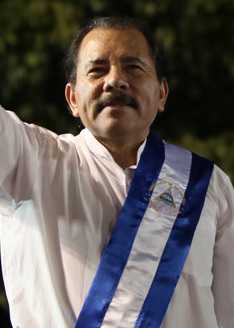

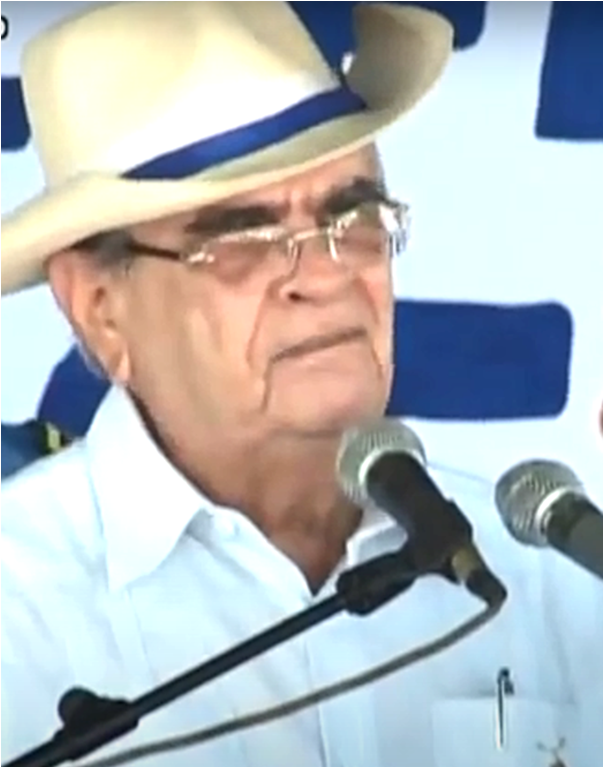

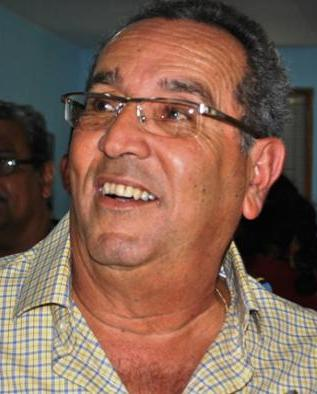
Candidate	Daniel Ortega	Fabio Gadea Mantilla	Arnoldo Alemán
Party	FSLN	PLI	PLC
Running mate	Omar Halleslevens	Edmundo Jarquín	Francisco Aguirre
Popular vote	1,569,287	778,889	148,507
Percentage	62.46%	31.00%	5.91%
- Results by department
President before election
Daniel Ortega
FSLN
Elected President
Daniel Ortega
FSLN
- Parliamentary election
- 90 seats in the National Assembly; 46 seats needed for a majority
Party	Leader	Vote %	Seats	+/–
FSLN	Daniel Ortega	60.64	62	+24
PLI	Fabio Gadea Mantilla	31.33	26	New
PLC	Arnoldo Alemán	6.59	2	−23
This lists parties that won seats. See the complete results below.
President of the National Assembly before	President of the National Assembly after
René Núñez; FSLN	René Núñez; FSLN

General elections were held in Nicaragua on 6 November 2011. The incumbent president Daniel Ortega, won a third term in this election, with a landslide victory.

== Background ==
The Sandinista National Liberation Front (Spanish: Frente Sandinista de Liberación Nacional, FSLN) returned to power with Daniel Ortega as president in 2007 after losing the 1990 general elections to the National Opposition Union (UNO) and its candidate, Violeta Barrios de Chamorro. It was the third election (1984, 1990, 2011) that the Sandinista National Liberation Front contested an election being in power.

Although the constitution had banned the re-election of a sitting president, the Constitutional Court ruled in 2009 that the ban was unenforceable and that Ortega could run again.

He faced Fabio Gadea Mantilla of the Independent Liberal Party, who was in alliance with other opposition forces both to the right and to the center-left of the national political spectrum including the Sandinista Renovation Movement (MRS).

Another candidate was former President Arnoldo Alemán, backed by the traditional Constitutionalist Liberal Party (Spanish: Partido Liberal Constitucionalista – PLC). Alemán had been convicted in 2003 for corruption and money laundering and been given a 20-year jail sentence, but his conviction was controversially overturned in 2009.

== Electoral system ==
Nicaragua's legislative elections operate within a list proportional representation voting system and so the percentage of votes that each party receives grants it the same proportion of seats in the legislature, with no minimum vote boundary. The 62.69% of the vote Ortega received in the election translated to nearly two-thirds of government seats for his party, falling just a few seats short of the two-thirds required to amend the constitution in Nicaragua.

== Presidential candidates ==
=== Alliance for the Republic (APRE) ===
President: Miguel Angel García, then Róger Guevara Mena Miguel Angel García is a leader of the evangelical organization Asamblea de Dios and a former education minister in the government of Enrique Bolaños. In an interview, García stated that God guided his acceptance of this candidacy and is assuring him he will win with the backing of a million votes.

Vice-President: Elizabeth Rojas

Elizabeth Rojas is an evangelical pastor and the running mate of Miguel Angel García on the APRE ticket.

=== Constitutionalist Liberal Party ===
President: Arnoldo Alemán Arnoldo Alemán was President of Nicaragua from 1997 to 2002. In the early 1990s he became Mayor of Managua after serving for two months as a councillor in Managua. He was popular due to his urban renewal projects which helped spruce up the city, severely damaged and never rebuilt after a 1972 earthquake. Alemán was constitutionally barred from running for another term, and was succeeded by his vice president, Enrique Bolaños. Allegations emerged that Alemán was concealing massive corruption in his administration. At the end of his presidency, public information about alleged corruption committed under his government became available.

Vice-President: Francisco Aguirre Sacasa Francisco Aguirre, national secretary of the Constitutionalist Liberal Party, is the running mate of Arnoldo Alemán in the 2011 general election.

=== Independent Liberal Party ===
President: Fabio Gadea Mantilla Fabio Gadea Mantilla is a radio journalist, writer, and politician. He is owner and co-founder of the news radio station Radio Corporación. He also represents Nicaragua as deputy to the Central American Parliament and was President of that body in 2004–2005, as well as having been a member of its Commission of Education, Culture, Sports, Science, and Technology from 2007 onward.

Vice-President: Edmundo Jarquín Edmundo Jarquín was the Sandinista Renovation Movement (MRS) vice-presidential candidate in the 2006 general elections. He finished in fourth place, receiving 6.29% of the votes. Jarquín founded in 1974, together with Pedro Joaquín Chamorro Cardenal, editor of newspaper La Prensa, the Democratic Liberation Union (UDEL) in the struggle against the Anastasio Somoza Debayle regime. Jarquín was head of the Ministry of Foreign Cooperation between 1981–84 and ambassador to Mexico (1984–88) and to Spain (1988–1990). In the 1990 elections he gained a seat in the National Assembly. Jarquín worked as an Inter-American Development Bank (IDB) official from 1992 to 2005 when he resigned and joined the MRS electoral alliance.

=== Nicaraguan Liberal Alliance ===
President: Enrique Quiñonez

Vice-President: Diana Urbina

=== Sandinista National Liberation Front ===
President: Daniel Ortega Daniel Ortega, coordinator of the Junta of National Reconstruction (1979–1985), ascended to the presidency after the 1984 elections. Ortega, general secretary of the Sandinista National Liberation Front (FSLN), was President of Nicaragua from 1985 to 1990 and presidential candidate of the FSLN in 1990, 1996, 2001 and 2006. In the 2006 general elections, Ortega won with 37.99% of the votes. Daniel Ortega placed first in all major polling prior to the election. Ortega ran his campaign ran on an anti-poverty platform, pulling broad support from across the country. After 85.2% of the votes were counted, The Electoral Council said that Ortega had 62.69% of the vote and the Liberal Party's Fabio Gadea had 30.96%. They confirmed Ortega's victory on 8 November.

Vice-President: Omar Halleslevens

Omar Halleslevens, a former Sandinista guerilla fighter, founder of the Sandinista Popular Army in 1979 and head of the armed forces between 2005 and 2010 is the vice-presidential candidate of the FSLN. In a poll conducted by M&R in 2009, Hallesleven was the second most popular public figure in the country, only behind Aminta Granera, the head of the National Police. In the same poll, 73.3% of the public regarded the National Army as the most trustworthy public institution in the country.

== Contending parties and electoral alliances ==
=== Alliance for the Republic ===
The Alliance for the Republic (Spanish: Alianza por la República – APRE) is formed by dissidents of the Constitutionalist Liberal Party and the Conservative Party (PC). In the 2006 general elections, APRE contested the elections in alliance with the Nicaraguan Liberal Alliance, an election in which the Nicaraguan Liberal Alliance's candidate placed second. For the 2011 election, these two parties remained allied and it was rumoured that they were being financed by and working with the governing party.

=== Constitutionalist Liberal Party ===
The Constitutionalist Liberal Party (Spanish: Partido Liberal Constitucionalista – PLC) is leading the GANA PLC-PC alliance together with the members of the Conservative Party. The Constitutionalist Liberal Party is one of the two major parties in the Nicaraguan 2 party system, along with the FSLN. Other parties struggle to achieve electoral success against these two parties. The Constitutionalist Liberal Party emerged from the Liberal Party of Nicaragua, along with the FSLN. The PLC merged with other smaller liberal groups in order to form a strong enough opposition to the FSLN.

=== Independent Liberal Party ===
The Independent Liberal Party is leading the UNE alliance (Nicaraguan Unity for the Hope – Spanish: Unidad Nicaragüense por la Esperanza). The UNE is composed by the Sandinista Renovation Movement, the liberal Vamos con Eduardo and Liberales por un proyecto de nación movements, the Citizens Union for Democracy (an alliance of 14 local non-profits), a faction of the Nicaraguan Resistance Party, the Conservative Unity Movement (formed by dissidents of the Conservative Party) and the Alcaldes 9 de Noviembre movement (former allies of the Liberal Constitutionalist Party).

=== Nicaraguan Liberal Alliance ===
The Nicaraguan Liberal Alliance (Spanish: Alianza Liberal Nicaragüense – ALN) is formed by dissidents of the Constitutionalist Liberal Party and the Conservative Party (PC). The group was formed as a response to Arnoldo Alemán's leadership of the Constitutional Liberal Party after allegations of his corruption. Along with general disgust of Alemán, the party formed when the PLC publicly allied with Daniel Ortega. Under the leadership of Eduardo Montealegre, other smaller liberal parties formed an alliance with the Conservative Party.

=== Sandinista National Liberation Front ===
Headed by Daniel Ortega since 1978, the Sandinista National Liberation front was formed in order to overthrow the Samoza family dictatorship that had been running the country for 46 years. In 1979, Ortega's Third Tendencia, a political sect of the party, overthrew the dictatorship and the new government quickly disposed of the Samoza family's land holdings and made public the country's major industries, but allowed smaller and medium-sized businesses to stay private. Since then, the party has yielded much power and even since the establishment of elections, has still managed to make up the majority of seats in the National Assembly, have major influence over the Nicaraguan Supreme Court, and maintain a passionate support base that consistently has good election turnout, despite supporters only making up around 30% of the population. The success of the FSLN in elections can be attributed to combination of passionate support base (with good voter turnout) and relatively inactive and indifferent Independent voters in Nicaragua, who have notoriously weak turnout for elections.

After the break-up of the FSLN-Convergence alliance in 2005, the FSLN formed the United Nicaragua Triumphs alliance. The allied political forces of the FSLN are; Yapti Tasba Masraka Nanih Aslatakanka (YATAMA), the indigenous party from Nicaragua's Atlantic Coast, Christian Democratic Union (UDC), Christian Unity Movement (MUC), Popular Conservative Alliance (APC) and a few smaller organisations of dissidents from the Constitutionalist Liberal Party and the Conservative Party and a fraction of members from the Nicaraguan Resistance Party, including members of the PLN, Anastasio Somoza Debayle's Liberal Party. However, in years later, the YATAMA indigenous advocacy organization turned political party announced their opposition to the FSLN when they clashed on issues of demarcation of indigenous lands and violence towards indigenous people. In 2006, YATAMA decided to ally with the FSLN to get their leader, Brooklyn Rivera, into a government position to represent the party; Rivera was elected as an Assemblyman but broke with FSLN in 2014 when he accused the party of stealing regional elections.

== Opinion polls ==
=== President ===
Cid Gallup

Party	Candidate	January 2011	May 2011	September 2011	October 2011
FSLN	Daniel Ortega	36%	38%	44%	46%
PLI	Fabio Gadea Mantilla	17%	28%	32%	34%
PLC	Arnoldo Alemán	23%	14%	13%	10%
Other	Other parties	N/A	4%	1%	1%
N/A	No answer	24%	16%	10%	9%

Consultora Siglo Nuevo

Party	Candidate	August 2011	October 2011
FSLN	Daniel Ortega	57.1%	59.6%
PLI	Fabio Gadea Mantilla	15.8%	15.0%
PLC	Arnoldo Alemán	7.3%	13.1%
Other	Other parties	1.7%	0.8%
N/A	No answer	18.1%	11.5%

M&R Consultores

Party	Candidate	June 2011
FSLN	Daniel Ortega	56.5%
PLI	Fabio Gadea Mantilla	14.1%
PLC	Arnoldo Alemán	5.8%
Other	Other parties	1.2%
N/A	No answer	22.4%

== Controversy ==
In October 2009, the Supreme Court, which has a majority of Sandinista judges, overturned presidential term limits as set by the constitution. Previously, the constitution of Nicaragua specifically prohibited consecutive terms and limited presidents to holding office for two terms. Many opponents claim that the bid to overturn the term limits should have been taken to Congress, because it requires full constitutional reform. Ortega initially proposed a congressional referendum amending the constitution, but his plan never came to fruition.

The case was tried in the Constitutional Courtroom of the Supreme Court of Justice (or CSJ) as a case of amparo, a method through which citizens whose constitutional rights have been violated may approach the courts for compensation. The amparo framework functions as a redress of grievances, wherein the court's decision impacts only the plaintiff, or individual(s) bringing forth the complaint. The use of amparo to address electoral reform greatly narrows the impact of the decision: because the injunction was filed by Ortega and 109 Sandinista mayors, the topic in question was whether the Constitution's ban on re-election violated the political rights of that group specifically. As a result, the ruling on re-elections applied solely to Ortega and the FSLN mayors; any opposition candidates seeking exemption to the re-election limits would have to file their own petition.

The decision was made unanimously by six judges from the governing Sandinista party, including three who were summoned as replacements when opposition magistrates did not attend. One such magistrate, Sergio Cuarezma, a member of the court's constitutional chamber, claims he was never informed of the afternoon session that overturned the ban. Another magistrate also claimed they were not given enough time to meet, and the third magistrate was out of the country, leading to allegations that the court convened without establishing a legal quorum.

Critics said this constitutional change could set the stage for Ortega to have the presidency for life. Furthermore, with a commanding majority in the election he could also promote constitutional changes to allow for his re-election indefinitely.

The results of the election were widely protested and produced diverse reactions. Fabio Gadea, an opposition candidate, said that "We cannot accept these results, since they represent not the will of the Nicaraguan people but of the Supreme Electoral Council," which was also controlled by Ortega's Sandinistas. Several Nicaraguan groups were forbidden from monitoring the election, causing the leader of the group of observers from the EU to note that the fact that domestic observation groups were not accredited "represents a problem for the transparency of the whole exercise." Hagamos Democracia and Etica y Transparencia, the largest domestic election organizations, were also critical of the election. Etica y Transparencia— which was not granted observer accreditation by the Ortega administration— later released a statement saying that "We estimate that the electoral process does not meet with the required minimum universal guarantees for an election," and Hagamos Democracia reported that four people suffered gunshot wounds and 20 were arrested in the north of the country. The leader of the Organization of American States observers, Dante Caputo, claimed that his staff was blocked from ten polling stations midway through voting, and the EU team of observers said they faced "sometimes inexplicable obstacles" to access.

Additionally, complaints from international observers raised questions about the validity of Ortega's margin of victory. Observers from the United States and other countries claim that the 2011 elections were flawed, and were manipulated by Ortega to strengthen his control of national institutions. However, the Sandinistas are widely popular and have strong public support as a result of their social programs (which have improved the standards of living for many poor Nicaraguans), so many observers conceded that Ortega would most likely have won the elections regardless of whether or not he committed fraud.

Freedom of the press was another area of contention, as many Nicaraguan journalists felt that they lacked the ability to speak freely. In June 2011, Journalist Roberto Mora spoke about the fear felt by independent journalists and how many feel that this has led to their self-censorship, saying "In order to avoid problems with the government, independent journalists are forced to censor themselves and avoid covering any controversial issues that may arouse the ire of the government." The Ortega family owns TV and radio stations, giving him control over much of the mass media, which, as a result, rarely gave air time to the opposition.

After the polls closed, the Organisation of American States' observer mission, led by former Argentine foreign minister Dante Caputo, said that its job was hindered in 10 of 52 polling stations and was "worrying. If we had trouble in 10 out of 52 polling stations, that means that in 20 per cent of the sample on which we normally base our assessment, we haven't been able to work as we normally do. That means that we can't say that things went appropriately in 100 per cent of the polling stations."

== Results ==
=== President ===
Candidate	Running mate	Party	Votes	%
Daniel Ortega	Omar Halleslevens	Sandinista National Liberation Front	1,569,287	62.46
Fabio Gadea Mantilla	Edmundo Jarquín	Independent Liberal Party	778,889	31.00
Arnoldo Alemán	Francisco Aguirre	Constitutionalist Liberal Party	148,507	5.91
Édgar Enrique Quiñónez Tuckler	Diana Urbina	Nicaraguan Liberal Alliance	10,003	0.40
Róger Antonio Guevara Mena	Elizabeth Rojas	Alliance for the Republic	5,898	0.23
Total			2,512,584	100.00
Source: Supreme Electoral Council

==== By department ====
Department/ Autonomous region	Ortega		Gadea		Alemán		Quiñónez		Guevara	
Department/ Autonomous region	Votes	%	Votes	%	Votes	%	Votes	%	Votes	%
Boaco	18,163	46.14%	18,034	45.81%	3,063	7.78%	73	0.19%	32	0.08%
Carazo	43,784	67.70%	17,400	26.90%	3,182	4.92%	175	0.27%	136	0.21%
Chinandega	64,090	70.59%	23,889	26.31%	2,503	2.76%	191	0.21%	120	0.13%
Chontales	37,704	44.54%	35,783	42.27%	10,783	12.74%	253	0.30%	137	0.16%
Estelí	38,361	60.79%	22,932	36.34%	1,562	2.48%	120	0.19%	129	0.20%
Granada	32,413	61.80%	17,465	33.30%	2,220	4.23%	194	0.37%	159	0.30%
Jinotega	46,434	52.16%	39,014	43.83%	3,242	3.64%	197	0.22%	131	0.15%
León	99,477	74.30%	28,298	21.14%	5,110	3.82%	571	0.43%	424	0.32%
Madriz	38,382	60.33%	22,840	35.90%	2,258	3.55%	93	0.15%	49	0.08%
Managua	278,339	69.02%	95,797	23.75%	26,192	6.49%	1,858	0.46%	1,108	0.27%
Masaya	42,749	59.92%	25,075	35.15%	3,104	4.35%	276	0.39%	141	0.20%
Matagalpa	62,544	57.63%	39,054	35.99%	6,454	5.95%	351	0.32%	122	0.11%
Nueva Segovia	47,260	55.36%	33,179	38.87%	4,718	5.53%	103	0.12%	107	0.13%
Río San Juan	23,706	60.92%	12,668	32.56%	2,326	5.98%	138	0.35%	73	0.19%
Rivas	31,782	68.07%	12,445	26.66%	2,052	4.40%	269	0.58%	139	0.30%
North Caribbean Coast	36,458	53.10%	23,929	34.85%	7,790	11.35%	398	0.58%	82	0.12%
South Caribbean Coast	21,321	61.16%	7,324	21.01%	5,886	16.89%	260	0.75%	60	0.20%
Source: CSE

=== National Assembly ===
Party	National			Departmental			Total seats	±
Party	Votes	%	Seats	Votes	%	Seats	Total seats	±
Sandinista National Liberation Front	1,583,199	60.85	13	1,595,470	60.64	49	62	+11
Independent Liberal Party	822,023	31.59	6	824,180	31.33	20	26	New
Constitutionalist Liberal Party	167,639	6.44	1	173,306	6.59	1	2	–23
Nicaraguan Liberal Alliance	19,658	0.76	0	24,870	0.95	0	0	–22
Alliance for the Republic	9,317	0.36	0	13,063	0.50	0	0	New
Special members (Note: The runner-up in the presidential election (Fabio Gadea Mantilla of the PLI) and the outgoing president are special members of the National Assembly; as Ortega was re-elected, the outgoing Vice President (Jaime Morales Carazo of the FSLN), who was not Ortega's running mate in this election (having been replaced by Omar Halleslevens, took his seat.)							2	0
Total	2,601,836	100.00	20	2,630,889	100.00	70	92	0
Source: Supreme Electoral Council

=== Central American Parliament ===
Party	Votes	%	Seats
Sandinista National Liberation Front	1,578,375	60.94	13
Independent Liberal Party	818,041	31.58	6
Constitutionalist Liberal Party	167,121	6.45	1
Nicaraguan Liberal Alliance	17,738	0.68	0
Alliance for the Republic	8,876	0.34	0
Total	2,590,151	100.00	20
Source: Supreme Electoral Council

== Reactions ==
Reactions were diverse and not unified on the result of the election, both in Nicaragua and internationally.

To illustrate the disparity of opinions and statements, below are a series of deviating positions on the election:

Those who did not recognize the election results: Local Electoral Observers such as the "Hagamos Democracia" and "Etica and Transparencia" have rejected the electoral results.

The Episcopal Conference of Nicaragua considered the election not to be transparent. They claimed that the election results did not accurately represent the will of the people.

The European Union Electoral Observers stated that "the process was led by an electoral system that was not independent and that failed to fulfill its job of transparency and collaboration with all political parties."

The Higher Council of Private Enterprise (COSEP) called for a replacement for the CSE.

The main opposition candidate, Fabio Gadea of the Liberal Independent Party, has also denounced the election as "fraud". President Ortega has urged his opponents to accept the results several times. The president of Nicaragua's election authority, Roberto Rivas, stated that "a process is legitimate if the people's wishes were respected, and that is what we are experiencing here." Gadea said that the result was allegedly plagued with vices and "that we suspect that we are in the presence of fraud of unprecedented proportions;" he also added that members of his party should await instructions as "the struggle continues."

The United States coincided with European Union Observers "that the Supreme Electoral Council did not operate in a transparent and impartial manner".

There have been three notable post-election violent clashes. Three opposition supporters were killed by the National Police in San Jose de Cusmapa, while one activist was killed in Siuna. The government and opposition has also clashed several times in the capital, Managua, during weekly protests for fair and transparent elections. The demonstrators gathered every week in front of the Supreme Electoral Council in the center of Managua.

Those who did recognize the election results: The Organization of American States ratified, that the results of the Nicaraguan general elections of 2011, won by Daniel Ortega Saavedra with more than 62 percent of the vote, corresponded to the count realized by this and other organizations during their electoral observer mission in Nicaragua. While they recognize the results, their report noted that there were several irregularities during the election involving providing identification cards to vote, proper accreditation of the election observers, and an imbalance in political parties present at polling stations.

The Carter Center issued a statement in the election aftermath stating "We acknowledge the strong electoral support given to President Ortega in Sunday's election".

The head of accompanying mission of the European Union (EU), Luis Yáñez called the triumph of Daniel Ortega and the Sandinista Front in the Nicaraguan General Elections indubitable and ruled out any possibility of fraud during them.

Rosario Murillo, Ortega's wife and spokeswoman, said of the win that: "This is the victory of Christianity, socialism and solidarity;" she also repeated Ortega's campaign slogan – "Our promise is to keep building the common good." Ortega's flourishing social programs and improvements to the economy has made him increasingly popular with both the working class and the poor.
