= Neoliberal Party =

Nicaraguan political party

The Neoliberal Party (Partido Neo-Liberal - PALI) is a Nicaraguan neoliberal right-wing political party that split from the Independent Liberal Party (PLI) in 1986. After being initially rejected, PALI received legal status after appealing in 1989. PALI participated in several alliances across multiple elections, such as is in the 1990 general election as part of UNO, in the 1996 general election as part of the Alianza Liberal, in the 2006 general election as part of the Constitutionalist Liberal Party (PLC) alliance, and in the 2008 municipal elections as part of another liberal alliance.

== History ==
The Neoliberal party, or PALI, was formed in 1986 by Andrés Zúñiga and a few other followers after splitting from the Independent Liberal Party, or PLI. The split was as a result of internal disagreements within the party.

When applying for legal status for party recognition, they were initially denied by the National Council of Political Parties on May 17, 1989, on the basis that they were not sufficiently unique from existing political parties, especially their name. In addition, the leadership of the party included former officials of Somoza's regime, which was seen as a way of including "Somocista" elements and therefore violating a constitutional principle. They appealed to the Supreme Electoral Council, and the council overturned the ruling and granted them legal status later that year.

In the 1990 general election, they joined the National Opposition Union, or UNO, to run against the FSLN. Later in the 1996 general election, they joined the Alianza Liberal, or Liberal Alliance, alongside the Constitutionalist Liberal Party (PLC), the Independent Liberal Party for National Unity (PLIUN), and the Nationalist Liberal Party (PLN).

In the 2006 general election, PALI was a part of the Constitutionalist Liberal Party (PLC) alliance, an alliance between the party by the same name, the Multiethnic Indigenous Party (PIM), the Nicaraguan Party of the Christian Path (CCN), the Nationalist Liberal Party (PLN), and the Central American Unionist Party (PUCA).

In the 2008 municipal elections, they joined another liberal alliance between the Nicaraguan Liberal Alliance (ALN) and the Constitutionalist Liberal Party (PLC), as well as three other minority parties including the Independent Liberal Party (PLI), Nationalist Liberal Party (PLN), and the Conservative Party.
