= United Alliance Nicaragua Triumphs =

United Alliance Nicaragua Triumphs Alianza Unida Nicaragua Triunfa
- Leader: Daniel Ortega
- Founded: 2006
- Preceded by: National Convergence
- Ideology: Sandinismo; Factions: Christian democracy Liberalism (Nicaraguan); Nationalism; Indigenism
- Political position: Big tent
- National Assembly: 75 / 90
- Central American Parliament: 15 / 20

The United Alliance Nicaragua Triumphs (Spanish: Alianza Unida Nicaragua Triunfa) is an alliance of political parties in Nicaragua led by the Sandinista National Liberation Front of president Daniel Ortega. It includes former Contra groups.

== Member parties ==
Following parties were part of the alliance during the 2022 local elections:

Party	Main ideology	Leader
Sandinista National Liberation Front (FSLN)	Sandinismo	Daniel Ortega
Alternative for Change (AC)	Political Protestantism	Orlando Tardencilla
Christian Unity Party (PUC)	Political Protestantism	Guillermo Daniel Ortega Reyes
Nationalist Liberal Party (PLN)	Liberalism	Constatino Velázquez Zepeda
Autonomous Liberal Party (PAL)	Liberalism	René Margarito Bello Romero
Nicaraguan Resistance Party (PRN)	Nationalism	Julio Cesar Blandon
Multiethnic Indigenous Party (PIM)	Indigenism	Carla Evis White Hodgson
Yapti Tasba Masraka Raya Nani Movement (Myatamaran)	Indigenism	
Progressive Indigenous Movement Party of the Moskitia (Moskitia Pawanka)	Indigenism	

Former member parties include:

Party	Main ideology	Leader	Elections
Nicaraguan Christian Democratic Union (UDC)	Christian democracy		2006, 2011
Sons of Mother Earth (YATAMA)	Indigenism	Brooklyn Rivera	2006, 2011
Nicaraguan Party of the Christian Path (CCN)	Political Protestantism	Guillermo Osorno	2011, 2016

== Electoral history ==
=== Presidential elections ===
Election	Party candidate	Votes	%	Result
2006	Daniel Ortega	854.316	38.07%	Elected ✓
2011	Daniel Ortega	1,569,287	62.46%	Elected ✓
2016	Daniel Ortega	1,806,651	72.44%	Elected ✓
2021	Daniel Ortega	2,093,834	75.87%	Elected ✓

=== National Assembly elections ===
Election	Votes	%	Seats	+/–	Position
2006	840,851	37.59%	38 / 92	▼1	▲1st
2011	1,583,199	60.85%	63 / 92	▲25	1st
2016	1,590,316	65.86%	70 / 92	▲7	1st
2021	2,039,717	74.17%	75 / 90	▲5	1st

== See also ==
- Great Patriotic Pole – the ruling alliance in Venezuela
