= National Convergence (Nicaragua) =

Convergencia Nacional or the National Convergence alliance was a coalition of a number of Nicaraguan political organizations, formed in support of Daniel Ortega's bid in the presidential election of 2001. Despite losing the presidential election, the FSLN-led alliance made steady gains in the 2004 municipal elections, and Ortega was elected president in 2006 with the United Alliance Nicaragua Triumphs. The alliance included Ortega's FSLN, Nationalist Liberal Party (the former ruling party of the Somoza era), Popular Conservative Alliance, Marxist–Leninist Popular Action Movement, Nicaraguan Christian Democratic Union, Up with the Republic, as well as the Christian Unity Movement and dissident minority factions of the Sandinista Renovation Movement, Nicaraguan Resistance Party and YATAMA. Majority factions of the latter 6 organizations have joined the anti-Ortega coalition Alianza PLC founded in 2008.
