= Eduardo Montealegre =

Nicaraguan businessman and politician (born 1955)

Eduardo Montealegre Rivas
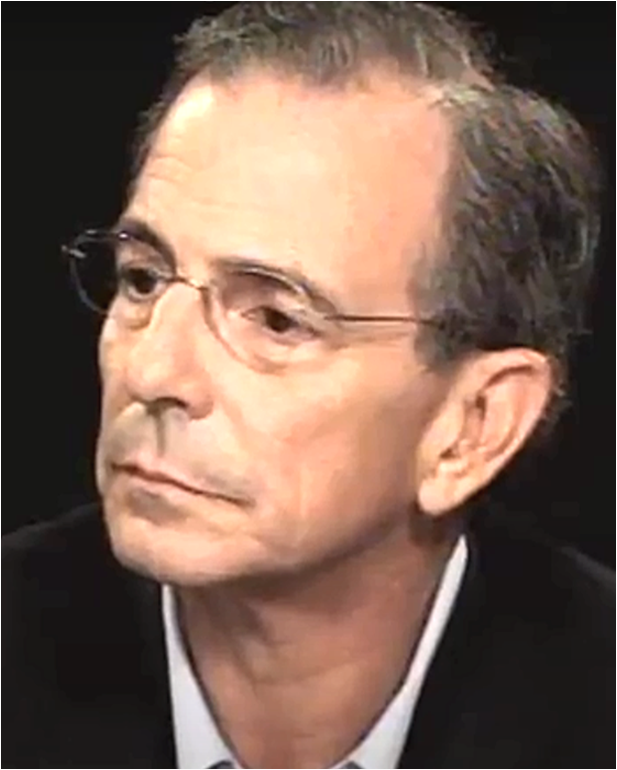
- Montealegre in 2014

Deputy to the National Assembly
- In office 9 January 2007 – 26 July 2016

Minister of Finance and Public Credit
- In office 2002–2003
- President: Enrique Bolaños

Minister of Foreign Affairs
- In office 1999–2000
- President: Arnoldo Alemán

Minister to the Presidency
- In office 1998–1999
- President: Arnoldo Alemán

Personal details
- Born: 9 May 1955 (age 71) Managua, Managua, Nicaragua
- Party: Independent Liberal Party (PLI)
- Spouse: Eliza McGregor Raskosky

Eduardo Montealegre Rivas (born 9 May 1955) is a Nicaraguan businessman and politician. He ran for president in the 2006 general election as the candidate of the Nicaraguan Liberal Alliance (ALN-PC) a split-off of the Constitutionalist Liberal Party (PLC) in alliance with other liberal parties and the Conservative Party. He finished in second place after Daniel Ortega, receiving 28.3% of the vote.

== Early life ==
Montealegre was born in Nicaragua's capital Managua, from a wealthy and prominent family in the banking sector, the direct descendant of Mariano Montealegre y Romero, founder of the city of Chinandega and co-signatory of the Montealegre-Jiménez Treaty with Costa Rica on the diversion of water from the Colorado River as well as the half-uncle of Costa Rican President José María Montealegre.. He received an Sc. B in Economics from Brown University in 1976 and an MBA with a focus in finance and strategic planning from Harvard University in 1980. He later became a businessman in Nicaragua.

== Political career ==
Montealegre served as minister to the presidency in 1998 under Arnoldo Alemán. He also served as foreign minister from 1999 to 2000 in the government of Arnoldo Alemán and as finance minister from 2002 to 2003 in the government of the next President Enrique Bolaños. Subsequently, he served as minister to the presidency of Enrique Bolaños. He announced his split from the PLC in protest of the control of the party by former President Alemán, who was imprisoned for misappropriation of funds. Montealegre objects to an alliance, referred to in the popular media as "El Pacto", between Arnoldo Alemán and Daniel Ortega, who ran as the candidate of the FSLN in 2006 for the fourth consecutive time since his 1985–1990 presidency, this time successfully. Because of Montealegre's stand against corruption of Arnoldo Alemán's PLC, and Daniel Ortega's Sandinista National Liberation Front, the U.S. ambassador in Managua openly endorsed his candidacy.

In 2006, a commission of Nicaragua's National Assembly threatened to criminally charge Montealegre, as well as a former head of the central bank and the former superintendent of banks. They allege that they abused their positions to enrich themselves by illegally issuing US$400 million in bonds in favor of banks that acquired several failed banks. Montealegre dismisses the charges, stating that he was no longer employed by the government when the bonds were emitted. In 2008, one of the members of the commission said the conclusions had been politically motivated and some of the facts invented under instructions from former President Arnoldo Alemán (1997–2002). In 2011, the charges have prescribed.

Montealegre was granted a seat in the Nicaraguan congress after the 2006 general elections, since a seat in Congress is guaranteed to the candidate who comes in second in presidential elections.

After losing control of the leadership of the ALN, Montealegre agreed to run for mayor of Managua in the November 2008 municipal elections as candidate of the alliance led by his former party, the PLC still ruled by Arnoldo Aleman. Montealegre lost the election to Alexis Argüello, but alleged that the election was rife with fraud. The municipal elections which were held in November 2008 were highly contested and were held without international observers due to the Sandinista government's reluctance to invite any observers. The supposed fraud of the municipal elections resulted in several days of protest mostly in but not limited to Managua.

== Election history ==
=== National Convention of the Constitutionalist Liberal Party (PLC) presidential primaries, 28 January 2001 ===
- Enrique Bolaños Geyer – 220 (54.6%)
- Eduardo Montealegre – 143 (35.5%)
- Iván Escobar Fornos – 38 (9.4%)
- Null – 2 (0.5%)

=== Presidential election results, 5 November 2006 ===
Candidate	Party/Alliance	Votes	%
Daniel Ortega	Sandinista National Liberation Front (FSLN)	930,862	38.00%
Eduardo Montealegre	Nicaraguan Liberal Alliance (ALN)	693,391	28.30%
José Rizo Castellón	Constitutionalist Liberal Party (PLC)	664,225	27.11%
Edmundo Jarquín	Sandinista Renovation Movement (MRS)	154,224	06.30%
Edén Pastora Gómez	Alternative for Change (AC)	7,200	0.29%
Total valid votes		2,449,902	100%

=== Elections for Mayor of Managua 2008, 9 November 2008 ===
Candidate	Party/Alliance	Votes	%
Alexis Arguello	Sandinista National Liberation Front (FSLN)	223,389	51.32%
Eduardo Montealegre	Constitutionalist Liberal Party (PLC)	202,752	46.58%
Others	3 Political Parties	9,104	02.09%
Total valid votes		100%	435,245

=== Summary of the 6 November 2011 Nicaraguan National Assembly election results ===
Parties	Votes	%	Seats
Sandinista National Liberation Front (Frente Sandinista de Liberación Nacional)	1,583,199	60.85	63*
Independent Liberal Party (Partido Liberal Independiente)	822,023	31.59	27*
Constitutionalist Liberal Party (Partido Liberal Constitucionalista)	167,639	6.44	2
Nicaraguan Liberal Alliance (Alianza Liberal Nicaragüense )	19,658	0.76	—
Alliance for the Republic (Alianza por la República)	9,317	0.36	—
Total votes	2,601,836	100.00	92
Source: CSE * The runner-up in the presidential election (Fabio Gadea Mantilla of the PLI) and the outgoing president are special members of the National Assembly; as Ortega was reelected, the outgoing Vice President (Jaime Morales Carazo of the FSLN), who was not Ortega's running mate in this election (having been replaced by Omar Halleslevens, will take up his seat. (AFP)
