= Liberalism in Nicaragua =

Overview of the political ideology in the Central American country

This article gives an overview of liberalism in Nicaragua. It is limited to liberal parties with substantial support, mainly proved by having had a representation in parliament. For inclusion in this scheme it is not necessary so that parties labeled themselves as a liberal party.

== Introduction ==
The liberal character of the Constitutional Liberal Party (Partido Liberal Constitucionalista, former member LI) is disputable.

== Liberal parties ==
=== Timeline ===
- 1838: The Democratic Party (Partido Democrático) was founded.
- 1893: PD was renamed to Liberal Party (Partido Liberal).
- 1936: PL merged into the authoritarian conservative ⇒ Nationalist Liberal Party.
- 1944: Dissidents of the PLN formed the Independent Liberal Party (Partido Liberal Independiente).
- 1968: Another dissident faction of PLN formed the Constitutionalist Liberal Movement (Movimiento Liberal Constitucionalista) which was later renamed to Constitutionalist Liberal Party (Partido Liberal Constitucionalista).
- 1984: The Independent Liberal Party for National Unity (Partido Liberal Independiente por la Unidad Nacional) split from PLI.
- 1986: The Neoliberal Party (Partido Neo-Liberal) split from PLI.
- 2004: Liberal dissidents of PLC and ⇒ PC formed the Alliance for the Republic (Alianza por la República).
- 2005: A PLC faction formed the Liberal Salvation Movement (Movimiento de Salvación Liberal).
- 2006: MSL was renamed to Nicaraguan Liberal Alliance (Alianza Liberal Nicaragüense).
- 2016: Liberal activists from PLC and PLI formed the Citizens for Freedom (Ciudadanos por la Libertad).
- 2021: The Supreme Electoral Council cancelled the legal status of the party Citizens for Freedom

== See also ==
- History of Nicaragua
- Politics of Nicaragua
- List of political parties in Nicaragua
