= 1990 Nicaraguan general election =

- 25 February 1990
- Presidential election
- Turnout: 86.23% (▲10.81pp)
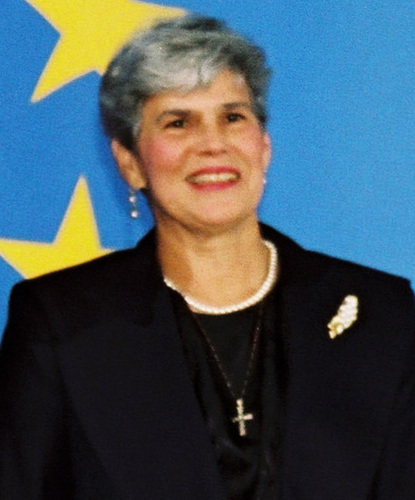

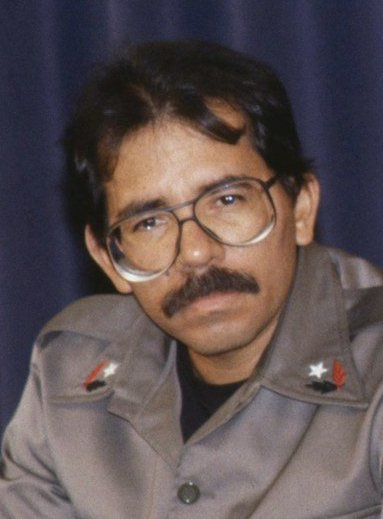
Candidate	Violeta Chamorro	Daniel Ortega
Party	UNO	FSLN
Running mate	Virgilio Godoy	Sergio Ramírez
Popular vote	777,552	579,886
Percentage	54.74%	40.82%
- Results by department
President before election
Daniel Ortega
FSLN
Elected President
Violeta Chamorro
UNO
- Parliamentary election
- 90 seats in the National Assembly; 46 seats needed for a majority
Party	Leader	Vote %	Seats	+/–
UNO	Violeta Chamorro	53.88	51	New
FSLN	Daniel Ortega	40.84	39	−22
PSC	Erick Ramírez	1.57	1	+1
MUR	Moisés Hassan	0.99	1	New
This lists parties that won seats. See the complete results below.
Results by constituency
President of the National Assembly before	President of the National Assembly after
Carlos Núñez; FSLN	Miriam Argüello; APC–UNO

General elections were held in Nicaragua on 25 February 1990 to elect the President and the members of the National Assembly. The result was a victory for the National Opposition Union (UNO), whose presidential candidate Violeta Chamorro surprisingly defeated incumbent president Daniel Ortega of the Sandinista National Liberation Front (FSLN).

== Background ==
Sandinistas had held power since the FSLN toppled the Somoza dictatorship in 1979. Daniel Ortega was elected President in 1984. Chamorro was the editor of the country's largest newspaper, La Prensa, which she took over after the assassination of her husband Pedro Joaquín Chamorro Cardenal in 1978. A vocal critic of the dictatorship, his murder galvanized support for the Sandinistas against the dictatorship. Following the revolution that overthrew Somoza, Violeta Chamorro initially supported the FSLN government, accepting an invitation to join the Junta of National Reconstruction. However she soon became disenchanted and resigned, returning to the newspaper and becoming a critic of the FSLN government. In 1989 the United States Congress approved $9 million for the promotion of democracy in Nicaragua, of which $2.5 million was set aside for the UNO, in addition to a $5 million grant for the opposition earlier that year. Beginning in early 1989 the government held a series of talks with the opposition about reforming electoral and media laws. In April 1989 the Electoral Law was reformed, giving the opposition a larger share of public campaign funds, increased access to state run media and permission to receive foreign financing.

== Campaign ==
With a diverse coalition of 14 opposition groups, the UNO mainly campaigned on a promise to end the decades of civil war and instability that wracked the country.

While the FSLN was mainly under controversy for their campaign due to their use of violence.

== Opinion polls ==
Opinion polls leading up to the elections divided along partisan lines, with 10 of 17 polls analyzed in a contemporary study predicting an UNO victory while 7 predicted the Sandinistas would retain power.

== Results ==
The election was organized by Mariano Fiallos Oyanguren, a law professor and Sandinista who was appointed by the FSLN in 1984 to head the Supreme Electoral Council. He faced party pressure to throw the race, specifically to announce at 19:00 on election night that the results of the first four precincts were four victories for the FSLN. Instead he chose to read the real results, which split the precincts, with two going to the FSLN and two to the ONU, which went on to win the election. Chamorro was elected with just under 55% of the vote.

Antonio Lacayo, a Sandinista supporter who voted for Ortega but ultimately served as a central figure in the Violeta Chamorro administration, said later: "Without Mariano Fiallos [Oyanguren] there would have been no democratic transition in 1990."

=== President ===
Candidate	Party	Votes	%
Violeta Chamorro	National Opposition Union	777,552	54.74
Daniel Ortega	Sandinista National Liberation Front	579,886	40.82
Erick Ramírez Beneventes	Social Christian Party	16,751	1.18
Moisés Hassán	Revolutionary Unity Movement	11,136	0.78
Bonifacio Miranda Bengoechea	Workers' Revolutionary Party	8,590	0.60
Isidro Téllez Toruño	Marxist–Leninist Popular Action Movement	8,115	0.57
Fernando Bernabé Agüero Rocha	Social Conservative Party	5,798	0.41
Blanca Rojas Echaverry	Central American Unionist Party	5,065	0.36
Eduardo Molina Palacios	Democratic Conservative Party	4,500	0.32
Rodolfo Robelo Herrera	Independent Liberal Party for National Unity	3,151	0.22
Total		1,420,544	100.00
Valid votes		1,420,544	94.02
Invalid/blank votes		90,294	5.98
Total votes		1,510,838	100.00
Registered voters/turnout		1,752,088	86.23
Source: Nohlen, Sarti

=== National Assembly ===
Party	Votes	%	Seats
National Opposition Union	764,748	53.88	51
Sandinista National Liberation Front	579,723	40.84	39
Social Christian Party	22,218	1.57	1
Revolutionary Unity Movement	13,995	0.99	1
Workers' Revolutionary Party	10,586	0.75	0
Marxist–Leninist Popular Action Movement	7,643	0.54	0
Social Conservative Party	6,308	0.44	0
Central American Unionist Party	5,565	0.39	0
Democratic Conservative Party	5,083	0.36	0
Independent Liberal Party for National Unity	3,515	0.25	0
Total	1,419,384	100.00	92
Valid votes	1,419,384	93.87	
Invalid/blank votes	92,723	6.13	
Total votes	1,512,107	100.00	
Registered voters/turnout	1,752,088	86.30	
Source: Nohlen

==== By region ====
Region	FSLN	UNO	Other
Boaco	24.04%	70.70%	5.26%
Carazo	51.62%	44.55%	3.84%
Chinandega	41.71%	54.26%	4.03%
Chontales	25.48%	70.31%	4.22%
Esteli	51.07%	44.45%	4.47%
Granada	37.52%	58.63%	3.85%
Jinotega	37.44%	54.81%	7.74%
Leon	45.67%	50.45%	3.87%
Madriz	40.90%	54.50%	4.59%
Managua	42.48%	53.35%	4.17%
Masaya	41.84%	54.65%	3.50%
Matagalpa	35.50%	59.27%	5.23%
Nueva Segovia	49.51%	46.60%	3.89%
RAAN	39.21%	17.02%	43.77%
RAAS	34.37%	58.70%	6.93%
Rio San Juan	57.72%	39.47%	2.81%
Rivas	45.09%	51.56%	3.34%
Source: Constituency Level Elections Archive

== Analysis ==
Daniel Ortega delivering a speech on February 26, 1990, at the Omar Torrijos Non-Aligned Movement Plaza in Managua, following the previous day's electoral defeat.

Possible explanations for the UNO victory include that the Nicaraguan people were disenchanted with the Ortega government, specifically discontentment with the management of the economy and the hostile posture toward the United States, believing the UNO was more likely to bring peace. Additionally, in November 1989, the White House had met with Chamorro on the subject of peace and democracy in Nicaragua and announced that the economic embargo against Nicaragua would end if Chamorro won. There are also reports of intimidation from the side of the Contras, with a Canadian observer mission claiming that 42 people were killed by the Contras in "election violence" in October 1989.
