= Coordinadora Democrática Nicaragüense =

The Coordinadora Democrática Nicaragüense (Democratic Coordinating Committee, CDN) was a coalition of three right-wing Nicaraguan parties which decided not to participate in the 1984 Nicaraguan general election and that won the 1990 Nicaraguan general election with more political parties and renamed as National Opposition Union. The parties were the Social Christians, the (right-wing) Social Democrats, and the Constitutional Liberal Party.

== See also ==
- National Opposition Union
- Arturo Cruz
