= Coordinadora Democrática =

Coordinadora Democrática (Democratic Coordinator) may refer to:

- Coordinadora Democrática Nicaragüense
- Coordinadora Democrática (Peru)
- Coordinadora Democrática (Venezuela)
