= Grand Liberal Union =

Right-wing Nicaraguan political party

The Great Liberal Union (Spanish: Gran Unión Liberal (GUL) is a right-wing Nicaraguan political party (never legally registered) formed by President Bolaños and other dissidents from the Constitutionalist Liberal Party (PLC) in 2004. After signing an electoral alliance with the Conservative Party, both organizations formed the Alliance for the Republic (APRE) in 2005. As of 2006, the GUL joined the Constitutionalist Liberal Party alliance.

== Sources ==
- Revista Envío
- La Prensa (in Spanish)
- El Nuevo Diario (in Spanish)
