= FJD =

FJD may refer to:

- Democratic Youth Front (Spanish: Frente de Juventudes Democráticas), a Peruvian political group
- Democratic Youth Front (Nicaragua) (Spanish: Frente Juvenil Democratico), the youth organization of the Independent Liberal Party
- Fijian dollar by ISO 4217 currency code
- Justice and Development Front (French: Front pour la justice et le développement), an Algerian political party
