= Partido Acción Nacional =

Partido Acción Nacional may refer to:

- National Action Party (El Salvador)
- National Action Party (Mexico)
- National Action Party (Nicaragua)
