= UNO-96 Alliance =

UNO-96 Alliance (Spanish: Alianza UNO-96), was a center-right Nicaraguan political alliance founded in 1996 by Alfredo César Aguirre, member of the National Opposition Union and campaign advisor to former president Violeta Barrios de Chamorro. The UNO-96 alliance obtained a seat in the National Assembly in the 1996 Nicaraguan general elections.
