= Alliance for the Republic =

Alliance for the Republic may refer to:

- Alliance for the Republic (Nicaragua)
- Alliance for the Republic (Senegal)
- Alliance for the Republic (Spain)
