= Conservative Alliance (Nicaragua) =

Political party in Nicaragua

The Conservative Alliance (Spanish: Alianza Conservadora, or ALCON) is a Nicaraguan political party founded in 2000 by conservatives loyal to the then President Arnoldo Alemán. The members of ALCON are erroneously referred to as "the purple ones", as the popular thought of mixing the green (conservative) and red (liberal) colors gives purple. As of 2006, ALCON is in the Constitutionalist Liberal Party electoral alliance.

Its registry was canceled in October 2005.
