= Unity Alliance =

The Unity Alliance (Spanish: Alianza Unidad - AU) was a Nicaraguan electoral alliance of three center left and right parties in the Nicaraguan 1996 elections. Members of the coalition were:

- Social Christian Party (PSC)
- Social Democratic Party (PSD)
- Revolutionary Unity Movement (MUR)

The presidential candidate of the Unity Alliance was Alejandro Serrano Caldera who pulled 5,207 out of 1,773,401 valid votes. In the legislative election they received 0.82% of the vote, which resulted in 1 seat.
