= Maximino Rodríguez =

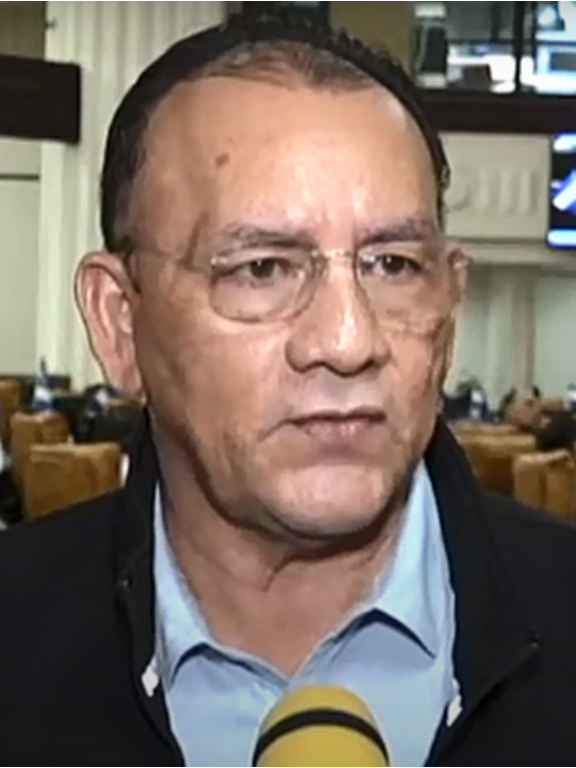
- Rodríguez in October 2019

Member of the National Assembly of Nicaragua
- In office 9 January 2017 – 8 January 2022
- In office 1997–2012

Personal details
- Born: Maximino Rodríguez Martínez; April 19, 1961 (age 65) León, Nicaragua
- Citizenship: Nicaraguan
- Party: PLC
- Occupation: Politician, lawyer, rancher

Maximino Rodríguez Martínez (born 19 April 1961) is a Nicaraguan politician, lawyer, and rancher. He is a long-time member of the Constitutional Liberal Party (PLC) and served multiple terms as a deputy in the National Assembly of Nicaragua. He was the PLC’s presidential candidate in the 2016 general election.

== Early life and Contra years ==
Rodríguez was born in 1961 in León (specifically associated with Malpaisillo). During the 1980s, as a teenager, he joined the Nicaraguan Resistance (the Contras) fighting against the Sandinista government. He used the nom de guerre “Comandante Wilmer” and rose to a command position. He was wounded multiple times in combat, including a gunshot to the head, and carries the lasting effects of those injuries.

After the war ended in 1990 he demobilized, returned to civilian life, studied law (with postgraduate work in social security and labor law), and became a cattle rancher and producer, mainly based in the Matagalpa region.

== Political career ==
Rodríguez entered formal politics in the mid-1990s. In 1996 he was elected deputy for Matagalpa on the ticket of the Party of the Nicaraguan Resistance (in alliance with the PLC). He later fully joined the PLC and was re-elected as a deputy in subsequent terms, serving continuously from the late 1990s until 2012 and again from 2017 to 2022.

He held leadership positions within the PLC, including departmental president in Matagalpa (twice) and at times served as head of the PLC bench in the National Assembly.

In 2016, after internal party tensions with Arnoldo Alemán, he was proclaimed the PLC’s presidential candidate (running mate: Martha McCoy). He finished second in the November 2016 election with approximately 15% of the vote.

He later expressed disappointment with the PLC leadership under María Haydée Osuna and largely withdrew from active politics after his last term in the Assembly.
