= National Opposition Union (Nicaragua, 1990) =

Coalition of political parties which contested the 1990 Nicaraguan general election

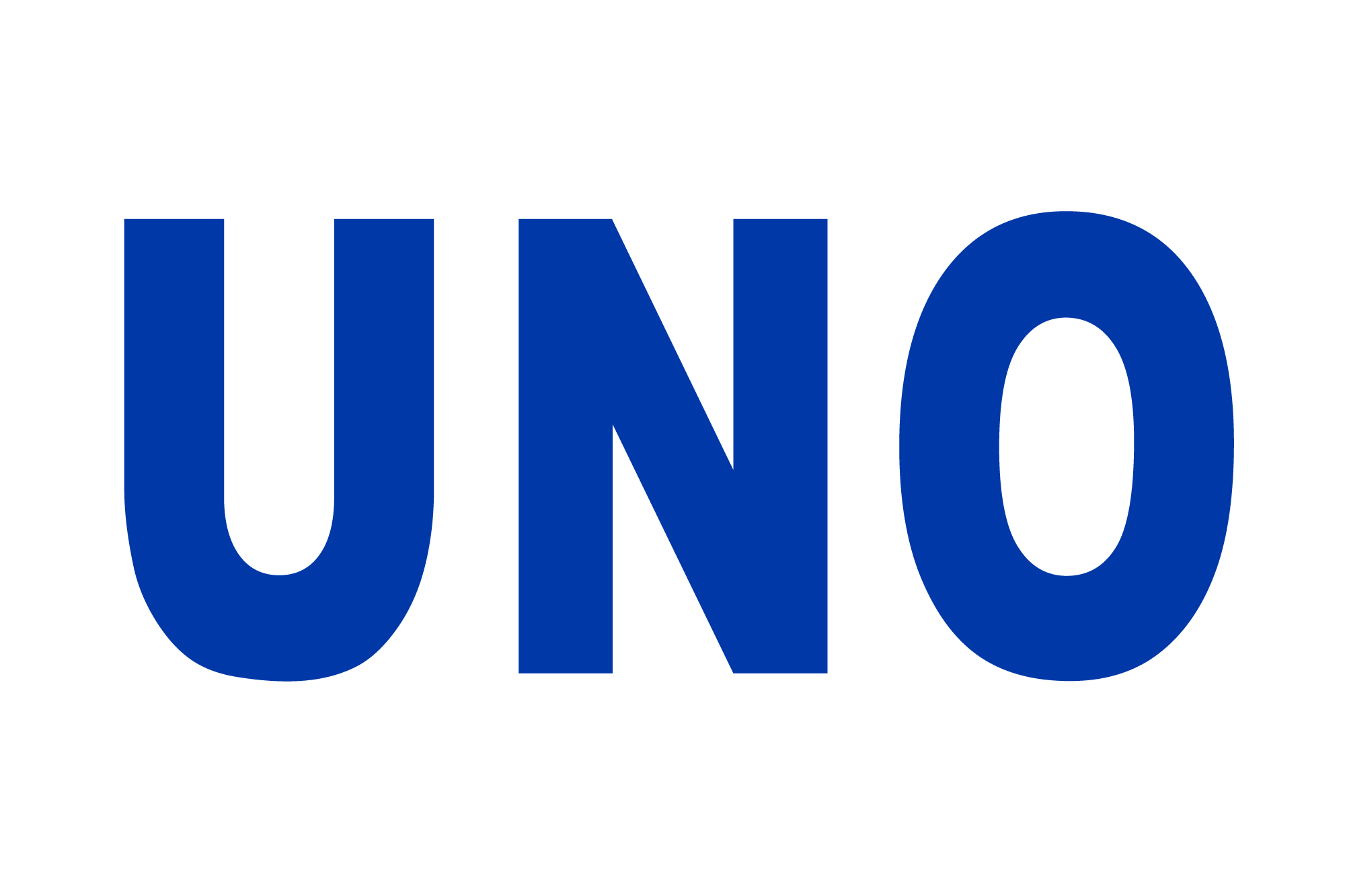
- Leader: Violeta Chamorro
- President: Joaquín Chamorro
- Founded: 1990
- Dissolved: 1995
- Headquarters: Managua
- Ideology: Anti-Sandinismo

National Opposition Union (Spanish: Unión Nacional Opositora, UNO) was a Nicaraguan wide-range coalition of opposition parties formed to oppose president Daniel Ortega's Sandinista National Liberation Front (FSLN) in the 1990 election. Its candidate Violeta Chamorro eventually won the race. UNO traced its origins back to the Nicaraguan Democratic Coordinating Group (Coordinadora Democrática Nicaragüense—CDN), which was formed in 1982 by different opposition groups. At the time of the election, of the UNO coalition's fourteen political parties, four were considered conservative, seven could be characterised as centrist parties, and three – including Nicaragua's Communists – had traditionally been on the far left of the political spectrum.

Despite the internal struggle, the UNO coalition under Violeta Chamorro succeeded in its campaign centered on the economic downfall and promises of peace. Chamorro promised to end the military draft, initiate democratic reconciliation, and restore economic growth. Many Nicaraguans felt that the contra war and bad economy would continue if the FSLN remained in power, because of the strong United States opposition to the FSLN (in November 1989, the White House had announced that the economic embargo against Nicaragua would end if Violeta Chamorro won.).

Meanwhile, resources and organisational help were given to the UNO by the United States government's National Endowment for Democracy (NED), which in June 1989 had received $2 million from U.S. Congress, which had also approved in April 1989 a package of $49.75 million in 'nonlethal' aid to the Contras, which funded their pro-UNO propaganda campaign. Some villages reported threats of murder from the Contras if they voted for the FSLN in the elections.

Chamorro election poster

In the presidential election held on 25 February 1990, Violeta Barrios de Chamorro won 55% of the popular vote against Daniel Ortega's 41%.

The UNO disbanded in the mid-1990s, after a very fractious rule during which little progress was made. The most positive consequence of their electoral victory was the end of the Contra War and the US economic embargo.

== Member parties ==
Political party	Orientation	Leader
Alianza Popular Conservadora (Popular Conservative Alliance)	Right-wing	Miriam Argüello Morales
Nicaraguan Democratic Movement (Nicaraguan Democratic Movement)	Centre-left	Roberto Urroz Castillo
Partido de Acción Nacional (National Action Party)	Centre	Eduardo Rivas Gasteazoro
Partido de Acción Nacional Conservadora (Conservative National Action Party)	Right-wing	Hernaldo Zúñiga Montenegro
Partido Comunista de Nicaragua (Communist Party of Nicaragua)	Left-wing	Elí Altamirano
Partido Conservador Nacional (National Conservative Party)	Right-wing	Silviano Matamoros Lacayo
Partido Demócrata de Confianza Nacional (Democratic Party of National Confidence)	Centre	Agustín Jarquín Anaya
Partido Integracionalista Centroamericano (Central American Integrationist Party)	Centre	Alejandro Pérez Arévalo
Partido Neoliberal (Neoliberal Party)	Right-wing	Andrés Zúñiga Mercado
Partido Liberal Constitucionalista (Liberal Constitutionalist Party)	Right-wing	José Somarriba
Partido Liberal Independiente (Independent Liberal Party)	Centre	Virgilio Godoy Reyes
Partido Popular Social Cristiano (Social Christian Popular Party)	Centre-left	Luis Humberto Guzmán
Partido Social Demócrata (Social Democratic Party)	Centre-right	Guillermo Potoy
Partido Socialista Nicaragüense (Nicaraguan Socialist Party)	Left-wing	Gustavo Tablada Zelaya
Source: Encyclopedia of the Nations

The APC, PANC, and PCN announced in 1992 that they would merge as the National Conservative Party (Partido Conservador Nationalista—PCN) for the 1996 elections.
