= Guillermo Daniel Ortega Reyes =

Nicaraguan politician

Guillermo Daniel Ortega Reyes is and politician from Nicaragua who served as President of the Central American Parliament from 28 October 2021 to October 2022. He is also an evangelical pastor and leader of the Christian Unity Party, a member of the ruling United Alliance Nicaragua Triumphs.
