= Citizens' Action Party (Nicaragua) =

Political party in Nicaragua

The Citizens' Action Party (Spanish: Partido Acción Ciudadana - PAC) is a Nicaraguan political party founded by the former legislative representative of the Sandinista Renovation Movement (MRS) in the National Assembly (1997-2001), Jorge Samper. After an ephemeral alliance with Alliance for the Republic (APRE) in 2005, the PAC is, as of 2006, part of the MRS Alliance.
