= Carlos Carrión Cruz =

Nicaraguan politician

Carlos Carrión Cruz is a Nicaraguan politician and civil engineer. From 1979 to 1985 he was head of the Sandinista Youth (JS), the founding national coordinator for the group. He was Mayor of Managua from 1988 to 1990, and also a member of the Sandinista National Liberation Front (FSLN).

== Family ==
Many of Carrión Cruz's relatives have also been involved in Nicaraguan politics. His siblings are Luis Carrión Cruz, one of the nine members of the FSLN National Directorate, and Gloria Carrión Cruz, General Secretary of AMNLAE, the Sandinista women's organization. He is a nephew of Arturo Cruz and a cousin of Arturo Cruz, Jr., as well as a cousin of Javier Carrión McDonough.
