= National Unity Movement (Nicaragua) =

The National Unity Movement (Spanish: Movimiento de Unidad Nacional - MUN) is a Nicaraguan political party founded in 2000 by retired army chief and Sandinista dissident Joaquín Cuadra. In the 2004 Municipal Elections, the MUN contested in alliance with Alliance for the Republic (APRE). As of 2006, the MUN is part of the Sandinista Renovation Movement (MRS) electoral alliance. The party embraces the Third Way.

== Sources ==
- Revista Envío
- (in Spanish) La Prensa
- (in Spanish) El Nuevo Diario
