= Independent Liberal Party (Nicaragua) =

Independent Liberal Party Partido Liberal Independiente
- Leader: José del Carmen Alvarado
- Founded: 1944
- Split from: Nationalist Liberal Party
- Headquarters: Managua, Nicaragua
- Ideology: Liberalism (Nicaraguan)
- Political position: Centre-right
- Regional affiliation: Center-Democratic Integration Group
- International affiliation: Liberal International (observer)
- Colors: Red, white and blue
- Seats in the National Assembly: 2 / 92

Party flag

Website
- www.plinicaragua.org

The Independent Liberal Party (Spanish: Partido Liberal Independiente - PLI) is a Nicaraguan political party, which separated from Somoza's Nationalist Liberal Party (PLN) in 1944 and took part in the probably fraudulent election of 1947, won by Somoza's favored candidate. The PLI participated in the 1984 election, winning 9.6% of vote for President with its candidate Virgilio Godoy. In 1990 it was part of the National Opposition Union (UNO) - a broad alliance of Sandinista regime opponents - with Virgilio Godoy running as the vice-presidential candidate. UNO won the elections with 54% of the vote. The UNO alliance split in 1993, and in the 1996 elections the PLI, under the candidature of Virgilio Godoy, suffered its worst electoral debacle, receiving only 0.32% of the vote. It joined with Enrique Bolaños' PLC for the 2001 elections, and was part of Montealegre's Nicaraguan Liberal Alliance in the 2006 elections.

During the 2011 presidential election, the party participated as part of an alliance against the ruling FSLN that also included the Movimiento vamos con Eduardo, a faction led by former PLC member Eduardo Montealegre, the Sandinista Renovation Movement, PAC, Partido Multiétnico por la Unidad Costeña, dissident Conservatives, Sociedad Civil and independents. The candidate for presidency was the veteran journalist and writer Fabio Gadea Mantilla. The election was eventually won by incumbent president Daniel Ortega with Gadea finishing second.

After many years of infighting between different factions, and five months before the 2016 general election, the Nicaraguan Supreme Electoral Court removed disputed PLI leader Eduardo Montealegre, replacing him with Pedro Reyes. Reyes, a little known figure in Nicaraguan politics, despite having been the PLI vice-presidential candidate in 1996 and PLI Secretary General from 1995-2005, was elected vice-president of the PLI, behind Rollin Tobie, in February 2011 at a disputed party convention, and claimed the presidency after Tobie's death in November 2011. After PLI and allied Sandinista Renovation Movement deputies objected, Nicaragua's Supreme Electoral Council ordered them removed from the National Assembly and empowered Reyes to select their replacements.

== See also ==
- Democratic Youth Front (Nicaragua)
