= Democratic Youth Front (Nicaragua) =

Political youth organization in Nicaragua

Democratic Youth Front (in Spanish: Frente Juvenil Democratico) was the youth organization of the Independent Liberal Party in Nicaragua. In the 1950s the FJD played an important political role in northern Nicaragua. FJD published Vanguardia Juvenil. Radical sections of FJD later joined the FSLN.
