= Multiethnic Indigenous Party =

The Multiethnic Indigenous Party (Spanish: Partido Indígena Multiétnico - PIM) is a regional Nicaraguan political party founded in 1998 by the PLC dissident and Maranatha pastor Rayfield Hodgson, governor of the South Atlantic Autonomous Region from 1994 to 1998. The PIM contested the 1998 Atlantic Coast Regional Elections and won 7 of the 45 seats on the RAAS Regional Council.
