= Sandinista ideology =

Left-wing political ideology

Sandinista ideology or Sandinismo is a series of political and economic philosophies instituted by the Nicaraguan Sandinista National Liberation Front throughout the late twentieth century. The ideology and movement acquired its name, image and its military style from Augusto César Sandino, a Nicaraguan revolutionary leader who waged a guerrilla war against the United States Marines and the conservative Somoza National Guards in the early twentieth century. The principals of modern Sandinista ideology were mainly developed by Carlos Fonseca, inspired by the leaders of the Cuban Revolution in the 1950s. It sought to inspire socialist populism among Nicaragua's peasant population. One of these main philosophies involved the institution of an educational system that would free the population from the perceived historical fallacies spread by the ruling Somoza family. By awakening political thought among the people, proponents of Sandinista ideology believed that human resources would be available to not only execute a guerrilla war against the Somoza regime but also build a society resistant to economic and military intervention imposed by foreign entities.

In Sandinismo, there is an emphasis that revolution begins in rural regions and people among Nicaragua's oppressed peasant class. Sandinista ideas are rooted in the symbols of Augusto César Sandino and there is an effort to develop conscious growth through education.

== History of the implementation of Sandinism ==
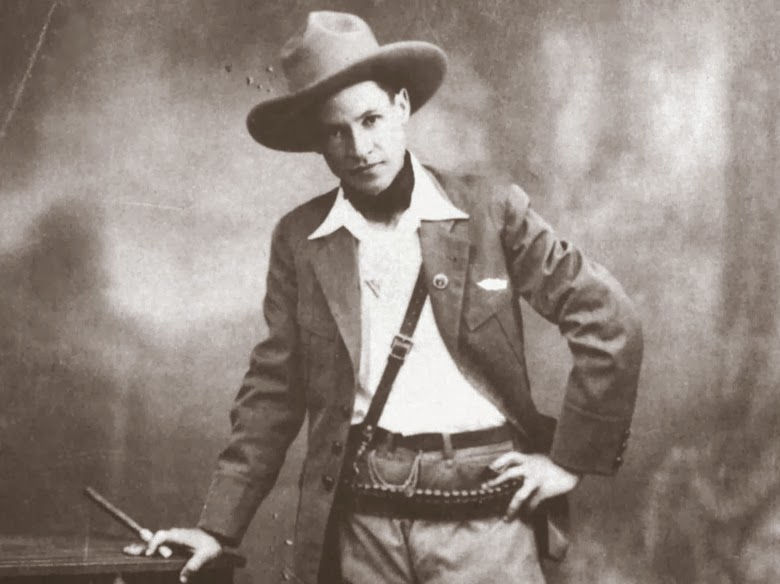
Augusto César Sandino.

Through the transformation of the Movement for a New Nicaragua (MNN) to the Sandinista National Liberation Front (FSLN) in 1961, Carlos Fonseca and his fellow revolutionary leaders adopted the image of 1930s guerrilla fighter, Augusto César Sandino to gain popular support across Nicaragua. Prior to the 1970s, the FSLN competed for peasant and worker support with other Somoza opposition groups such as the Partido Socialista de Nicaragua (PSN). The PSN claimed to be a pure Marxist group, committed to fostering mass support of the proletariat and participating in elections before agreeing to any type of revolution. Aligned at first, the alliance between FSLN and PSN broke due to the PSN refusing to take on Sandino's image for he had originally refused to embrace Marxism, and the FSLN leaders disagreeing with the PSN and Conservative association.

In the mid-1960s, the FSLN failed at their revolutionary attempts by using Che Guevara's foco model, stating that under the correct repressive and alienating economic and political conditions of the rural population, a small armed movement would be able to gain followers throughout rural and urban populations. While many FSLN members were exterminated, the decade Fonseca spent underground allowed him to research Sandino and come up with a more concrete ideological framework and an appropriate time to resurface on the Nicaraguan scene.

This opportunity emerged in the 1970s, when the Somoza government confiscated relief funds for personal gain instead of giving aid to individuals and families after the 1972 Managua earthquake. Fonseca stated that the persistent problems that existed in Nicaragua could not be solved through legal activities and elections. Instead, Fonseca drew from the success of the Cuban Revolution and the life of Sandino to persuade students, workers, and peasants to gain power through the revolutionary force of the FSLN.

Sandino, who had fought a six-year guerrilla war against the Conservatives and the United States Marines in Nicaragua from 1927 to 1933, was generally viewed as a popular war hero prior to his death. While student movements had used his name in brief struggles, Sandino's assassination in 1934 and the censorship of his name by the Somoza regime and the United States backed Guardia Nacional resulted in the meaning of his struggle being lost through the generations. The only book that was publicly available domestically to Nicaraguans was an account of Sandino that portrayed him as a bandit and communist, written by Somoza.

Fonseca revived Sandino's image by writing five texts: Proletarian Guerrilla, Tricontinental, The Political Ideology of General Sandino, Chronology of Sandinista Resistance and Secret Chronicle: Augusto César Sandino Confronts His Betrayers. Sandinistas value Sandino as a hero but also recognize his failure to fulfill his mission due to the lack of class-consciousness that existed during the 1930s. Fonseca explained, "It was to the glory of the people of Nicaragua that the most humble class responded for the stained honor of the nation. At the same time, it was a tragedy because we are speaking of a peasantry without any political awareness. The result was that once Sandino was assassinated, his movement was incapable of continuity." Due to Sandino's ambiguous writings, such as those indicating his years as a Liberal and his friendship and break with Augustín Farabundo Marti, a communist, it is difficult to ascertain how Fonseca reconstructed Sandino's image. However, the result focused on Sandino's anti-imperialist struggle as a path that failed but would succeed under the correct path, making use of the masses.

Carlos Fonseca adopted many of the Sandinista military goals from Che Guevara in 1959. Just as Guevara had implemented his guerrilla foco in the Sierra Maestra mountains of the Oriente province, Fonseca believed Nicaragua's Revolution would begin with mass insurgency in the Nicaraguan countryside.

== Populism and guerrilla warfare ==
Carlos Fonseca is considered the principal ideologue of the Sandinistas because he established the fundamental ideas of Sandinismo.

Many aspects of Sandinismo are similar to tendencies in other forms of political thought in Latin America like its appeal to the largest mass of the population and its anti-imperialist rhetoric. The most important attributes of the ideology make it solely a Nicaraguan creation. In Sandinismo, there is an emphasis that revolution begins in rural regions among Nicaragua's oppressed peasantry, Sandinista ideas are rooted in the symbols of Augusto César Sandino and there is an effort to develop conscious growth through education.

Carlos Fonseca adopted many of the Sandinista military goals from the Cuban Revolutionary experience led by Fidel Castro and Che Guevara in 1959. Just as Guevara had implemented his guerrilla foco in the Sierra Maestra mountains of the Oriente province, Fonseca believed Nicaragua's Revolution would begin with mass insurgence in the countryside. However, Ernesto 'Che' Guevara and Fidel Castro had themselves studied Sandino's war against the American Marines in Nicaragua during the late 1950s.

Fonseca's early experiences with student activism led him to declare himself a Marxist in 1954. In the 1950s at the National University of Nicaragua in Leon, Fonseca began developing his radical ideology by studying the Marxist classics. As a student in the 1960s, Fonseca split from the Pro-Moscow Communist Party of which he was a member of due to their unwillingness to commit to armed warfare. This began Fonseca's ideological move toward scientific socialism and revolutionary nationalism following the foot steps of Che and Fidel. Fonseca's own writings began mentioning Sandino in 1959 and in the context of the Cuban Revolution during his stay in Havana. In Cuba, where he found a biography called "Sandino: General of Free Men", Fonseca was able to study Sandino freely and to begin constructing what he saw as a uniquely Nicaraguan revolutionary ideology. Fonseca's biographer, Matilde Zimmermann, argues that the year 1958 to 1960 were crucial years in the development of Sandinismo as they marked a turning point in Fonseca's political thought, shifting from Stalin to Sandino as the banner of revolutionary struggle. In the 1961–1962 debates in Havana over the creation of a Nicaraguan revolutionary front, it was Fonseca who persuaded his Nicaraguan student counterparts that Sandino's name should be incorporated in their party. It was in 1961 when the Sandinista Front would be created in Honduras.

Fonseca's ideological tendency was entitled the "Protracted People's War" because of its mass support among the peasantry and its reliance on guerrilla tactics. The gradual approach in the countryside involved isolating portions of the highly trained National Guard into weaker portions, and eliminating these smaller segments one by one. Popular support from the rural masses was needed to take on the Somoza forces. These peasants that were taking part in guerrilla activities had to have developed a new revolutionary consciousness for them to risk their lives to attain freedom.

== Education ==
Sandinistas, like many Marxists, believe that education is a manifestation of the beliefs of the ruling government, so the regime's ideological tendencies are passed down to the youth. Under the Somozas there was a lack of properly funded schools in the countryside, most peasant children received no lessons and their parents were illiterate as well. In Somoza's state, he wanted: "… uneducated people, little more than beasts of burden." When assessing the democratic practices in Costa Rica, Somoza stated: "I want oxen, not men, in my country."

Fonseca's Sandinistas were bent on "freeing the minds" of the peasantry by instilling an 'official' understanding of history that places struggle against imperialism and the abundance of the national heroes the peasants at the center of a Marxist historical interpretation of Nicaragua. Nationalism and class solidarity were developed through the growth of consciousness, and as time went by, the realization that the use of arms would be required was also fostered.

In Sandinismo, nationalism and sovereign independence were key motivators. The sometimes mythic tales of Sandino tapped into the artistic imaginations of the peasants who needed to be convinced, and political passion was given a more concrete form. As with any populist movement, to go along with its abstract ideas an excellent leader was required to march in front of the masses.

== Tendencies ==
Sandinismo had several doctrinal strands during the years of insurgency and throughout the revolutionary period. These factions, or tendencies, grew out of ideological and strategic differences from FSLN leaders – disjunctions which were encouraged by Somoza’s counter-insurgency tactics. The Guerra Popular Prolongada, Tendencia Proletaria, and Tendencia Insurreccional (Terceristas) officially separated in late 1975.

The Guerra Popular Prolongada (Prolonged Peoples’ War) was based in Maoist ideology and stressed a guerrilla approach, gaining this tendency a foothold in the countryside. Meanwhile, the Tendencia Proletaria (Proletariat Tendency) resonated with urban audiences as a more class conscious group that emphasized the proletariat over the peasantry. The Terceristas (Third Way), led by Daniel and Humberto Ortega, gained preponderance over their more doctrinaire rivals during the revolutionary years.

The Terceristas identified capitalism as 'the main obstacle to social progress,' but championed a gradual transformation of society towards Socialism. They believed Nicaragua would have to go through a transitional popular-democratic revolutionary phase that would not be explicitly Marxist-Leninist until it reached a socialist society. The Sandinismo of the Terceristas called for 'Marxist ideological clarity' only among its top ranks and not among the masses in fear of Nicaraguans' reaction to such policies. What differentiated Tercerista ideology from other Sandinismo strains is the willingness to have tactical alliances with bourgeois sectors of society. These included alliances with non-revolutionary and non-socialist organizations and individuals. The Terceristas’ relationship with Los Doce was indicative of the nature of many of these alliances and gained vital national and international support for the FSLN. Ultimately, these ideologies allowed them to capture young Sandinistas from traditional families that were isolated from the GPP, urban elites left out of the TP’s platform, and moderate parties that opposed the Somoza dictatorship.

While the Terceristas did not escape controversy over the preservation of a pure Marxist analysis, their appeals for tactical and temporary broad alliances resonated with the people of Nicaragua. This broad appeal made the Tendencia Insurreccional uniquely situated to mediate between the other two splinter groups following Fonseca’s death in 1977, and led to the eventual reunification of the FSLN in March of 1979. However, strong ideological differences between former factions would remain, and go on to weaken a Sandinismo government after the ousting of Somoza’s regime.

Ultimately, the Terceristas’ unique approach, which acknowledged that experiences and circumstances in Nicaragua were different than in Europe and the Soviet Union, molded the revolution and socialist ideology. For instance, the Sandinista government ratified the 1951 UN Convention on Refugees and its 1967 Protocol in 1980, welcoming Salvadorans fleeing from U.S.-backed violence perpetrated by the Salvadoran government. Conversely, the Soviet Union never supported these protocols, citing an overly-western influence in the convention. This, among many other distinct policies and practices, contributed to a distinct branch of Latin American Socialism.

== Symbolism ==
Fonseca was highly influenced by Nicaraguan hero Augusto Sandino, whose history he was introduced to by Cuban revolutionaries. Sandino led a peasant insurgence against the first Somoza government in the 1930s under the Liberal Party banner.

When the Somoza dictatorship was in power they had failed to develop proper educational institutions. To the dismay of Sandinistas, in school classes Sandino was described as a bandit and an enemy of good government. In the 1970s, Fonseca brought a new interpretation of Sandino to the Sandinista party members wishing to dispense upon the masses: his quest to attain the sovereign-independence of Nicaragua had not been accomplished generations after his assassination. Sandino wished to remove the foreign influences that were dominant in the country, and prevented the government from conducting business for the well-being of the Nicaraguan people. Fonseca wished to use his newly developed history of Nicaragua to unite the rural peasants to instill a greater sense of pride, to encourage men to take part in the anti-imperial struggle and to increase revolutionary solidarity.

Unlike Fonseca, Sandino was not a Marxist-Leninist. The Nicaraguan people's struggle against William Walker and Sandino's struggle against the Somoza forces was not directed at a socialist telos. Like Sandino, Fonseca wished to ignite the consciousness of the peasantry, and they were a collective force that Fonseca showed could be in control of their own futures. Fonseca believed that the first liberty that the masses should have was the ownership of the land where they labored. Economic sovereignty in the majority of Nicaragua's economic sectors would allow growth to remain in the state, as well as reward the people who rightfully deserved some profit.

In some ways, Sandino's mission had been a failure since he did not remove the dictator who was in power, but Fonseca was able to retain the strong legacy of Sandino's spirit in his contemporary military approach. Sandino's guerrilla experience showed Fonseca that revolutionary processes could be developed among the peasantry. Fonseca also learned from Sandino's endeavors that revolutionaries had to learn from past errors, there was a need for theory to guide action, and the collective sharing of knowledge was essential.

While rejecting teleological visions, Fonseca still believed that the formation of revolutionary consciousness was making peasants into 'complete human beings'. The idea of consciousness was borrowed from Sandino, and also from the Cuban revolutionaries. As the peasants were taught to read and write they developed a conscious awareness of their reality and were able to see the exploitation they endured under the Somoza regime.

The message Fonseca and Sandino left was to teach the peasants to read and write. This did not occur too often in the 1930s. But for Sandinistas, education was a major function of the movement. Conscious people were committed to the revolution, even with the fatal risks involved.

== Modern caudillo ==
Fonseca made himself a modern Sandino; at times he overlooked the importance of obtaining support from the urban revolutionaries (Humberto Ortega). Fonseca envisioned himself as a patriot of the true indigenous Nicaragua. His supporters saw him as a respectful leader, inspirational, imaginative, determined, self-confident, displayed personal-magnetism and had absolute integrity. Where Fonseca distinguished himself from Sandino was in his emphasis on education for the peasantry. When Sandino was assassinated his revolutionary thoughts died with him. In the case of Fonseca, he had put so much work into making a "collective will" and consciousness among the peasantry that the Sandinista Revolution was able to survive and thrive after Fonseca's death in battle. The Sandinista political thought was so deeply enshrined in the peasants that the Somoza forces could not bring an end to the revolt by simply killing any revolutionary leaders.

== See also ==
- Sandinista National Liberation Front
- Sandinista Renovation Movement

== Bibliography ==
- Gambone, Michael D. Capturing the Revolution: the United States, Central America and Nicaragua, 1961–1972. Praeger Publishers. New York; 2001.
- Macaulay, Neil. The Sandino Affair. Quadrangle Books. USA; 1967.
- Walker, Thomas. Nicaragua, the Land of Sandino. Westview Press. USA; 1991.
