= Central American Unionist Party =

The Central American Unionist Party (Spanish: Partido Unionista Centroamericano - PUCA) is a center-right Nicaraguan political party.

PUCA was originally established as a cultural grouping advocating 'Central Americanization' in 1904. Renamed the Committee of State in 1944, it began to act as a political party after the Sandanistas gained power in 1979. PUCA received legal status after the 1984 elections. As of 2006, PUCA is in the Constitutionalist Liberal Party electoral alliance.

== See also ==
- Nicaraguan Revolution
