= Alfredo César Aguirre =

Nicaraguan politician (born 1951)

President of the National Assembly of Nicaragua
- In office January 1991 – January 1993
- President: Violeta Chamorro
- Preceded by: Miriam Argüello
- Succeeded by: Gustavo Tablada Zelaya

Personal details
- Born: April 24, 1951 (age 75) Granada

Alfredo César Aguirre is a Nicaraguan politician and former President of the National Assembly.

César was born on 24 April 1951 in Granada as a son of Alfredo César Chamorro, who was an anti-Somoza activist.

César is an industrial engineer by profession, and graduated from University of Texas at Austin in 1972, and he got a master's degree in finance from Stanford University in 1976. Then he returned to Nicaragua and worked in private sector. He joined the anti-Somoza revolution in 1978, however, he was captured, and in December 1978 released due to pressure from Carter administration. He then left into exile to Costa Rica.

After Somoza fled the country in 1979, César became the general secretary of the first Junta of National Reconstruction, established in Costa Rica in 1979. He was appointed as Minister National Reconstruction, and in that role he reorganized the recently nationalized banking system and renegotiated Nicaragua's foreign debt in 1980. He served as the President of Central Bank of Nicaragua from June 1981 to May 1982. He resigned from the central bank in May 1982 due to disagreements with Daniel Ortega, the coordinator of the governing junta.

César then went to exile to Costa Rica for a second time. He was hired as a financial advisor by President Luis Alberto Monge. He was a member of the executive committee of the Southern Opposition Bloc.

After the elections of 1990, César was elected to the National Assembly. Violeta Barrios de Chamorro supported his candidacy to President of the National Assembly in 1990, but he failed to win those elections until 1991. He was President of the National Assembly from January 1991 to January 1993. He was an unsuccessful candidate in the 1996 presidential elections. He then returned to work in private sector.

In 2013, César was elected as the leader of the Conservative Party. He was elected as a deputy to the National Assembly in the 2016 elections. He resigned his seat as a protest to Ortega policies in December 2019.
