= Virgilio Godoy =

Nicaraguan politician

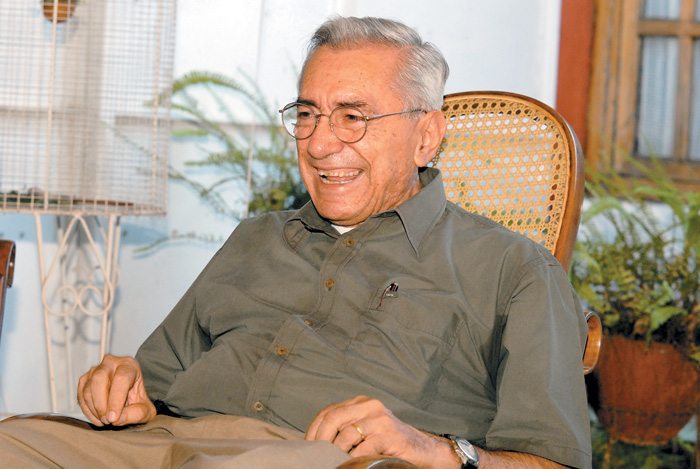

Vice President of Nicaragua
- In office 25 April 1990 – 23 October 1995
- President: Violeta Chamorro
- Preceded by: Sergio Ramírez
- Succeeded by: Julia Mena

Personal details
- Born: 1 May 1934 León, Nicaragua
- Died: 17 November 2016 (aged 82) Managua, Nicaragua
- Party: Independent Liberal Party
- Education: Central University of Ecuador, National Autonomous University of Mexico

Virgilio Abelardo Godoy Reyes (1 May 1934 in León – 17 November 2016 in Managua) was a Nicaraguan politician who served as the vice president of his respective Central American nation from 25 April 1990 until he resigned in October 1995 to run for president in the 1996 presidential election.

Godoy was one of the founding members of PLI in 1970s. He represented his party within the opposition coalition against the government of Anastasio Somoza Debayle. Upon the triumph of the Sandinista Revolution, he was appointed as minister of labor by the ruling junta. Later he opposed the Sandinista government. He was elected in the 1990 presidential ticket of National Opposition Union as running mate of Violeta Barrios de Chamorro.

Godoy was twice an unsuccessful candidate for president – in the 1984 Nicaraguan general election and in the 1996 Nicaraguan general election.

He worked as professor in National Autonomous University of Nicaragua–León.
