= Up with the Republic =

Political party in Nicaragua

Up with the Republic (Spanish: Arriba la República), formerly known as Up with Nicaragua (Arriba Nicaragua), was a neo-populist Nicaraguan political party founded in 1996 by banker Álvaro Robelo.

In year 2000, Robelo joined forces with another banker, Haroldo Montealegre, under the banner of Up with the Republic. They proposed dollarizing the economy, establishing a flat tax and shrinking the size of government.
