= Christian Unity Movement =

Christian Unity Movement (Spanish: Movimiento de Unidad Cristiana - MUC) was founded by dissidents from the Nicaraguan Party of the Christian Path (CCN) in year 2000. As of 2006, MUC is part of the Sandinista National Liberation Front alliance United Alliance Nicaragua Triumphs.

== See also ==
- Nicaraguan Revolution
- Sandinista National Liberation Front
