= National Project =

The National Project (Spanish: Proyecto Nacional - PRONAL) was a Nicaraguan political party founded in 1995 by Antonio Lacayo, son-in-law of Violeta Barrios de Chamorro. Lacayo was prohibited from running in the 1996 elections by the Supreme Electoral Council (CSE) due to his family ties with President Chamorro. PRONAL ran instead with presidential candidate Benjamín Lanzas who pulled 0.53% (9,323 valid votes).
