= Miriam Argüello =

Nicaraguan politician and lawyer (1927–2019)

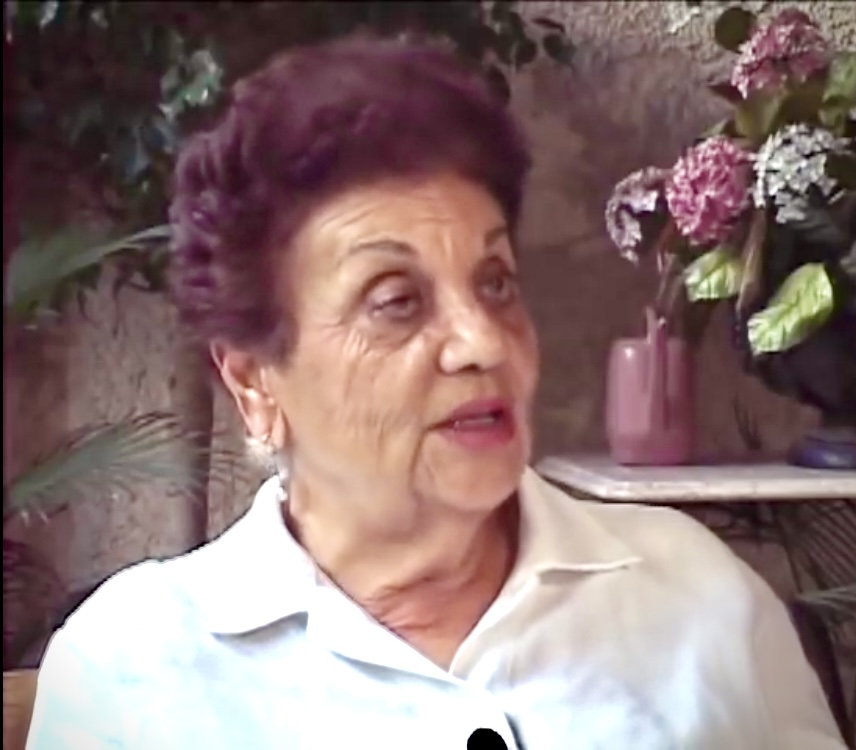
- Argüello in 2005

President of the National Assembly
- In office April 1990 – January 1991
- President: Violeta Chamorro
- Preceded by: Carlos Núñez Téllez
- Succeeded by: Alfredo César Aguirre

Deputy to the National Assembly

Personal details
- Born: February 22, 1927
- Died: February 7, 2019 (aged 91)
- Party: National Opposition Union
- Occupation: Lawyer; Deputy
- Known for: First woman elected president of the National Assembly

Miriam Argüello Morales (February 22, 1927 – February 7, 2019) was a politician from Nicaragua. A lawyer by training, she was the first woman to become president of the National Assembly of Nicaragua, where she served as a deputy for 22 years. She was elected Assembly president in 1990, defeating Alfredo César Aguirre though he had the support of Nicaraguan President Violeta Chamorro. However, César prevailed the following year, replacing Argüello in 1991.

In 1996, Argüello ran for President of Nicaragua as a member of the Popular Conservative Alliance (APC). Though in the previous term, both the Presidency and Vice-Presidency had been held by women—Chamorro and Julia Mena Rivera, respectively—few other women served in the Chamorro administration and in 1996 Argüello was the lone woman among 23 presidential candidates.

In 2007, Argüello allied with the Sandinista National Liberation Front (FSLN), but broke again with the ruling party in 2012 over the re-election of FSLN leader Daniel Ortega as President, saying the Supreme Court's ruling allowing Ortega a third term violated the Nicaraguan Constitution as well as legal precedent barring anyone from serving three terms as President or serving for two consecutive terms.
