= Revolutionary Unity Movement =

Nicaraguan political party

MUR symbol

MUR election poster

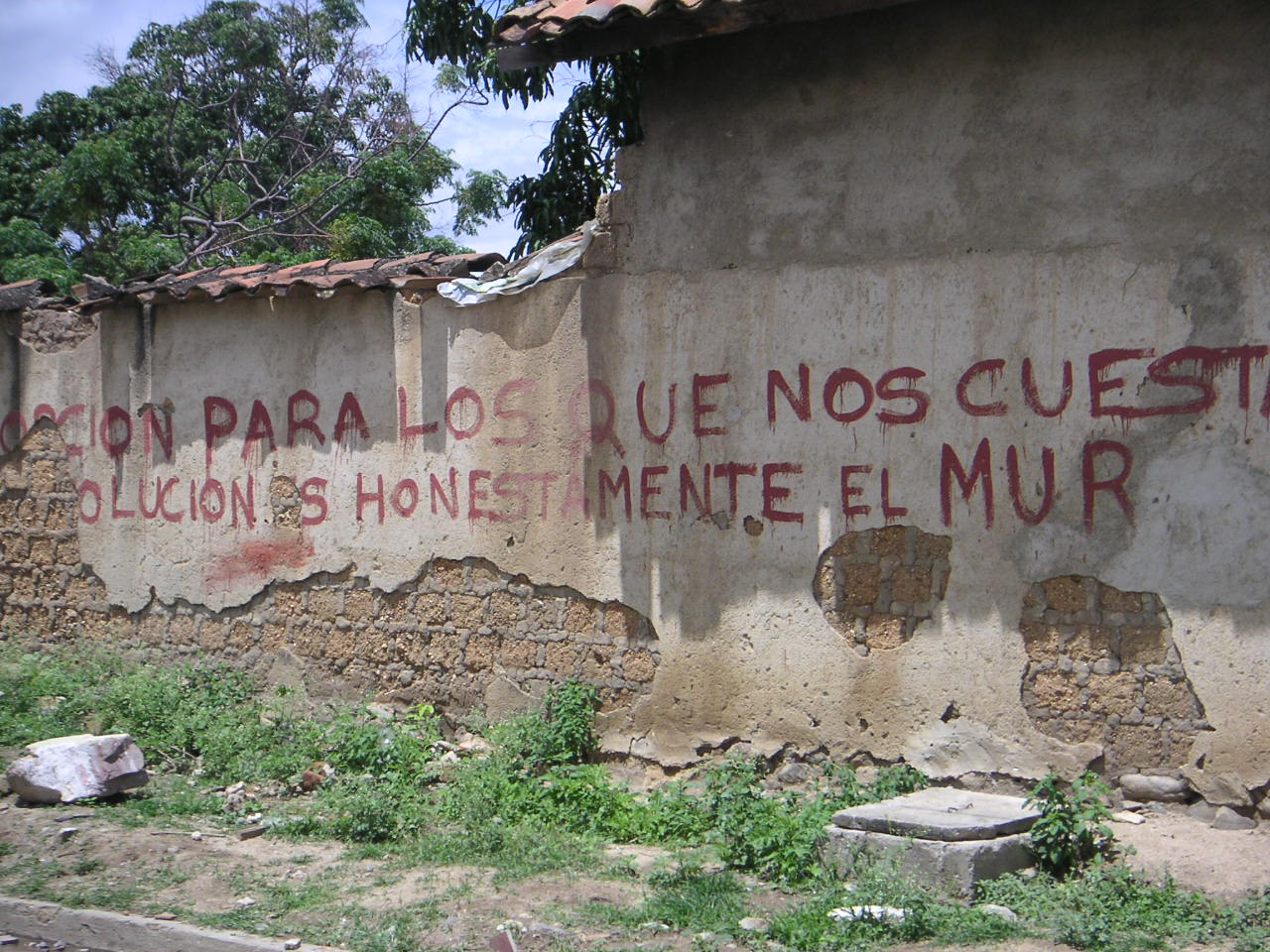
MUR mural in Ocotal

The Revolutionary Unity Movement (In Spanish: Movimiento de Unidad Revolucionaria - MUR) is a Nicaraguan political party, founded in 1988 as a new Marxist party by defectors from the Marxist-Leninist Party of Nicaragua (PMLN), Nicaraguan Communist Party (PCdeN), and the Sandinista National Liberation Front (FSLN). Ex-FSLN member, Moisés Hassán, Managua's former Sandinista major, was the leader of the organization. MUR participated in the 1990 Nicaraguan Presidential Elections (with Hassan as its presidential candidate) and won one seat (out of 110) in the National Assembly.

The president of MUR (as of 2004) is Francisco Samper.
