= National Conservative Action =

The National Conservative Action (Spanish: Acción Nacional Conservadora - ANC) was a right-wing conservative Nicaraguan political party founded in 1956. The ANC was part of the National Opposition Union (UNO) coalition in the 1990 elections and got two representatives in the National Assembly, out of UNO's 51. The ANC attended alone in the 1996 elections and won an assembly representative in the North Atlantic Autonomous Region (RAAN), even though it got only 0.64% of that region's votes; 311 valid votes.

The ANC lost its legal status together with 15 other parties in 2005.

== Sources ==
- Election data 1990
- How Nicaraguans Voted
- (in Spanish) Regulación Jurídica de...
