= Independent Liberal Party for National Unity =

The Independent Liberal Party for National Unity (Partido Liberal Independiente por la Unidad Nacional) (PLIUN) is a Nicaraguan centre-right party that split from the Independent Liberal Party in 1984 as a consequence of PLI's decision to participate in the 1984 elections. PLIUN received legal status in 1989. As of 2006, PLIUN is part of the Constitutionalist Liberal Party electoral alliance in the 2006 Nicaraguan general election.
