= National Action Party (Nicaragua) =

Political party in Nicaragua

The National Action Party (Partido Acción Nacional - PAN) is a Nicaraguan Christian democratic political party founded by Eduardo Rivas Gasteazoro in 1985 as a split from the Social Christian Party (PSC) in 1985. The PAN received legal status on appeal in 1989. PAN was part of the National Opposition Union (UNO) coalition and won 3 seats (out of UNO's 51) in the National Assembly in 1990.
