= Fabio Gadea Mantilla =

Nicaraguan politician and journalist

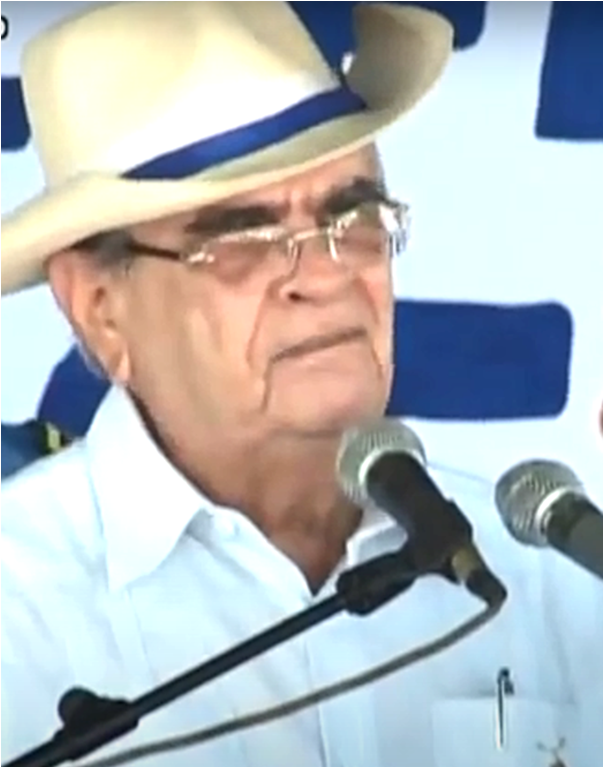

Fabio Gadea Mantilla (born November 9, 1931, in Ocotal, Nueva Segovia) is a Nicaraguan radio journalist, writer, and politician. He is owner and co-founder of the news radio station Radio Corporación. He also represents Nicaragua as deputy to the Central American Parliament and was President of that body in 2004–2005, as well as having been a member of its Commission of Education, Culture, Sports, Science, and Technology from 2007 onward.

In 2010, he was nominated to run as a candidate for President of Nicaragua in the November 2011 general election.

In November 2011 he lost the election to Daniel Ortega of the FSLN.
