= Nicaraguan Socialist Party =

- Founded: 1944
- Ideology: Communism
- Political position: Left-wing

PSN election poster

The Nicaraguan Socialist Party (Partido Socialista Nicaragüense) is a political party in Nicaragua. Founded in July 1944 by Dr. Mario Flores Ortiz. PSN operated as the official communist party in the country. At the time of its foundation, PSN supported the regime of Anastasio Somoza García. PSN considered that Somoza (nominally a liberal) was an anti-fascist ally.

== History ==
In the mid-1960s the U.S. State Department estimated the party membership to be approximately 250. After the surge of the FSLN (which had its origins in PSN), PSN was gradually side-lined.

In 1967 a group of radicals who opted for armed struggle were expelled. They formed the Socialist Workers Party.

In 1974 PSN joined UDEL.

From 1976 onwards there was a PSN breakaway group, called the Nicaraguan Socialist Party (de los Sánchez).

Towards the end of the Somoza regime, the PSN established the Organización Militar del Pueblo (Military Organization of the People). The OMP conducted a few attacks against the regime.

In 1990 PSN joined hands with right-wing forces in the National Opposition Union to topple the Sandinista government. PSN still exists, but is no longer a communist party per se.

PSN publishes El Popular.

For the 2006 Nicaraguan general election, it joined with the Sandinista Renovation Movement.
