= Social Democratic Party (Nicaragua) =

The Social Democratic Party (Spanish: Partido Social Demócrata, abbreviated PSD) is a center-left Nicaraguan political party that split from Conservatives in 1979. The party sought affiliation to the Socialist International, but its application was rejected.

The PSD abstained from 1984 elections. As of 2006, the PSD was in an electoral alliance with the Constitutionalist Liberal Party (PLC).
