= Nicaraguan Liberal Alliance =

Nicaraguan Liberal Alliance Alianza Liberal Nicaragüense
- Leader: Saturnino Mirando Cerrato Hogdson
- Founded: 2005
- Split from: Constitutionalist Liberal Party
- Headquarters: Managua, Nicaragua
- Ideology: Liberalism (Nicaraguan); Liberal conservatism Conservatism
- Political position: Centre-right
- Colors: Red
- National Assembly: 2 / 92

The Nicaraguan Liberal Alliance (Spanish: Alianza Liberal Nicaragüense – ALN) is a political coalition in Nicaragua. It was started in 2005 by Eduardo Montealegre and other members of the Constitutional Liberal Party (Partido Liberal Constitucionalista – PLC) who opposed former President of the country Arnoldo Alemán's continued control of the PLC even after he had been found guilty of misuse of public funds, and was sentenced to 20 years in prison. Montealegre also opposed the political alliance, commonly referred to as 'El Pacto', between Alemán as head of the PLC and Daniel Ortega, head of the Sandinist National Liberation Front (Frente Sandinista de Liberación Nacional – FSLN).

In addition to bringing in other liberal groups such as the Independent Liberal Party and the New Liberal Party, the ALN formed an alliance with the Conservative Party of Nicaragua (Partido Conservador – PC), a minor party in terms of political strength, but historically an important one. The Nicaraguan Liberal Alliance is now recognized by the acronym ALN-PC. The vice-presidential candidate for the ALN-PC was Fabricio Cajina, formerly a member of the FSLN.

The ALN was known as the Liberal Salvation Movement (Spanish: Movimiento de Salvación Liberal - MSL) until 2006. During the election campaign, several more parties joined the Nicaraguan Liberal Alliance, including the Nicaraguan Democratic Movement, the Social Conservative Party, and the movement that those parties had been part of, the Alliance for the Republic.

At the 2006 elections, the ALN-PC candidate Eduardo Montealegre came in second place with 28% of the vote, too far behind the winner, FSLN candidate Daniel Ortega, to qualify for a runoff under the Nicaraguan election system. In the congressional elections, the ALN came in third place, gaining about 23 of the 92 seats. In the 2011 elections, the party garnered less than 1% of the vote in the Presidential and Parliamentary vote.
