= Moisés Hassan =

Nicaraguan politician

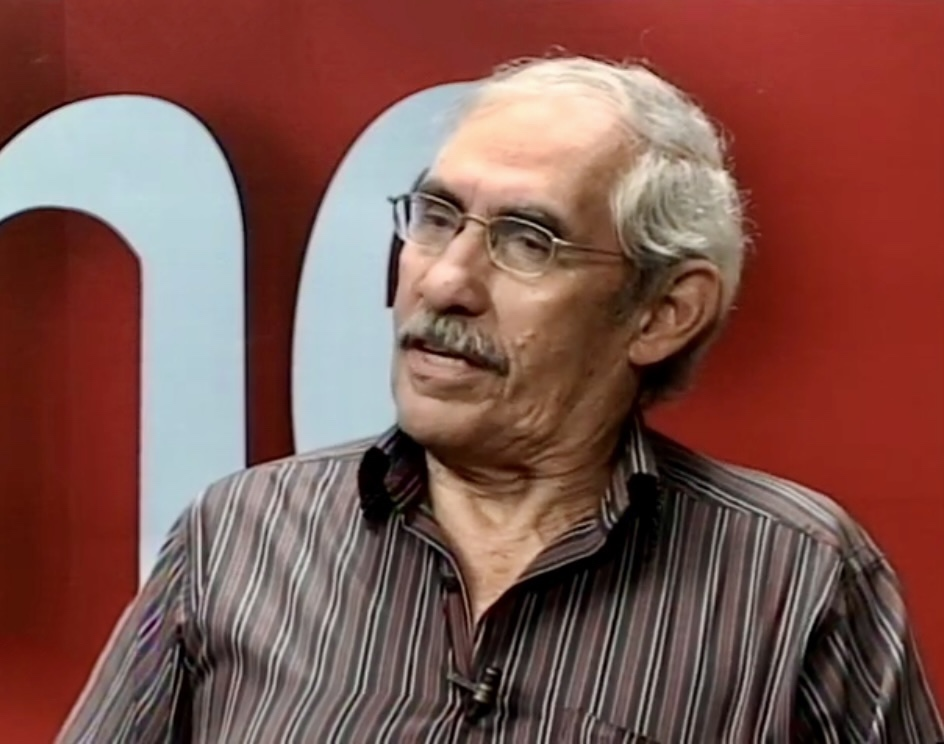
- Hassan in 2016
- Born: May 4, 1942 (age 84); Managua, Nicaragua
- Education: National Autonomous University of Nicaragua; North Carolina State University
- Spouse: Rosario Murillo (m. 1968; div. 1972)
- Children: 1

Moisés Hassan Morales (born 4 May 1942) is a Nicaraguan politician. He was one of five members of the Junta of National Reconstruction that ruled the country from 1979 to 1984, following the fall of the Somoza regime.

== Early life ==
Born in Managua on May 4, 1942, to a Nicaraguan mother and Palestinian father from Gaza (then part of Mandatory Palestine), Hassan studied engineering at the National Autonomous University of Nicaragua (UNAN). In 1968, he earned a PhD in physics from North Carolina State University in Raleigh, North Carolina.

== Career and militancy ==
Hassan was a long-time dissident and early FSLN member. He attended his first protest against the Somoza dictatorship in 1958 and was jailed several times for his continued dissidence. He joined the FSLN in its infancy in the 1960s and was a key figure in the organization by the time the uprising came to a head in the late '70s, having built a network of subversives in Managua’s slums.

He was the dean of the UNAN's College of Science and Letters until he joined the anti-Somozas effort in 1978. He was head of the activist National Association of Professors and became its delegate to the United People's Movement, a coalition of civic groups supporting the Sandinistas, which he founded in 1978.

He led the September 1978 uprising against the regime.

In 1979, he joined the five-member Junta of National Reconstruction (RN), alongside fellow Sandinistas, intellectual Sergio Ramírez and commander Daniel Ortega, as well as Violeta Chamorro, widow of La Prensa publisher Pedro Joaquín Chamorro Cardenal; and prominent businessman Alfonso Robelo. Hassan left the RN in March 1981.

Hassan served as Minister of Construction until he became Vice-Minister of the Interior in May 1983. From 1984 to 1988, he was Mayor of Managua. His technical skills made him valuable in that capacity, dealing with persistent flooding in the capital.

Hassan split with the FSLN in 1988. He was removed from his post as Mayor for failure to follow orders from the nine-member FSLN National Directorate, at times at odds with ideological hardline members Tomás Borge and Bayardo Arce. Hassan resigned the party shortly thereafter.

On December 16, 2009, he published La maldición de Güegüense.

His papers are held at the Hoover Institution Library and Archives at Stanford University, acquired in 2002.
