= Nicaraguan Democratic Movement =

The Nicaraguan Democratic Movement (Movimiento Democrático Nicaragüense - MDN) is a right-wing Nicaraguan political party with social democratic ideology. The MDN was formed in 1978 and re-registered in 1989. MDN was the first Contra party given legal status in Nicaragua. After receiving a small number of votes, the MDN lost its legal status in the 2004 municipal elections. After an ephemeral alliance with Alliance for the Republic (APRE), the MDN is, as of 2006, in an electoral alliance with the Nicaraguan Liberal Alliance (ALN).
