= Nicaraguan Party of the Christian Path =

Nicaraguan Party of the Christian Path Partido Camino Cristiano Nicaragüense
- Abbreviation: CCN
- Leader: Guillermo Osorno
- Founder: Guillermo Osorno
- Founded: 1995
- Dissolved: unknown
- Ideology: Christian fundamentalism Evangelicalism
- Political position: Right-wing
- Religion: Pentecostalism (Assemblies of God)
- National affiliation: United Alliance Nicaragua Triumphs (formerly)
- Colours: Light blue
- National Assembly: 1 / 92

Website
- Facebook Page

The Nicaraguan Party of the Christian Path (Spanish: Partido Camino Cristiano Nicaragüense, CCN) was a Nicaraguan political party founded in 1995 by the Assemblies of God pastor and radio evangelist Guillermo Osorno. CCN participated for the first time in the Nicaraguan general elections in 1996 where they got 4.10% of the votes and 4 seats in the National Assembly.

In the 2001 nation election the party formed an alliance with the Constitutionalist Liberal Party and Nicaraguan Resistance Party. The coalition running under the name of the Constitutionalist Liberal Party won government with a majority of the votes.
