= Social Christian Party (Nicaragua) =

Nicaraguan political party

The Social Christian Party (Partido Social Cristiano – PSC) is a Nicaraguan political party with Christian democrat ideology founded in 1957. As of 2006, the PSC was part of the Sandinista Renovation Movement alliance in the 2006 Nicaraguan general election.
