= Popular Conservative Alliance =

Nicaraguan political party

APC election poster for mayoral election of Managua

The Popular Conservative Alliance (Spanish: Alianza Popular Conservadora - APC) is a right-wing conservative Nicaraguan political party. The APC split from the Democratic Conservative Party (PCD) in 1984 when Miriam Argüello led a group opposed to the PCD's position on whether to participate in elections.

In the 1990 elections the party won five seats as part of the National Opposition Union, and joined the government after the UNO was elected. As of 2006, the APC and its leader, Miriam Argüello, were in alliance with the Sandinista National Liberation Front.
