= Alliance for the Republic (Nicaragua) =

Alliance for the Republic Alianza por la República
- Leader: Carlos José Canales
- Founded: 2004
- Split from: Constitutionalist Liberal Party
- Headquarters: Managua, Nicaragua
- Ideology: Liberal conservatism
- Political position: Centre-right
- National affiliation: Nicaraguan Liberal Alliance
- Colors: Purple
- Seats in the National Assembly: 1 / 92

Party flag

The Alliance for the Republic (Spanish: Alianza por la República - APRE) is a centre-right liberal-conservative Nicaraguan political party founded in 2004 by dissident liberals from the Constitutional Liberal Party (PLC) and the Conservative Party (PC) including Enrique Bolaños, who was President of Nicaragua at the time (10 January 2002 to 10 January 2007).

APRE won 3 major offices (out of 152) in the 2004 municipal elections. For the 2006 Autonomous elections on the Caribbean Coast APRE lost four of its allies; the Conservative Party (PC), the Nicaraguan Democratic Movement (MDN) and the Social Conservative Party (PSC) to the Nicaraguan Liberal Alliance (ALN) and the National Unity Movement (MUN) to the Sandinista Renovation Movement (MRS).

APRE didn't pull enough votes to win a seat in the Regional Council and shortly after the elections, the two remaining allies of APRE abandoned the alliance; the Nicaraguan Party of the Christian Path (CCN) went to support the Constitutionalist Liberal Party (PLC) in the upcoming elections and the Party for Citizen Action (PAC) joined the Sandinista Renovation Movement (MRS) alliance.

As of 2006, APRE is part of the Nicaraguan Liberal Alliance (ALN).

== Controversy ==
APRE was created and backed up by the presidential offices as the official government party, the Constitutional Liberal Party (PLC), declared itself in opposition to the Bolaños government in February 2003. The party enjoyed the resources of incumbency until the end of President Bolaños’s term in January 2007 and is also backed by some of the country’s most affluent capitalists.

Bolaños became a member of the National Assembly after his presidency.
