= Constitutionalist Liberal Party =

Constitutionalist Liberal Party Partido Liberal Constitucionalista
- President: María Haydeé Osuna
- Founded: 1968; 58 years ago
- Split from: Nationalist Liberal Party
- Headquarters: Barrio 3-80, Pista de La Resistencia, Managua
- Ideology: Liberalism (Nicaraguan); Conservatism; Neoliberalism
- Political position: Centre-right to right-wing
- Regional affiliation: Center-Democratic Integration Group
- Colors: Red
- Slogan: "Unidos y Organizados el Triunfo es Garantizado!"
- National Assembly: 9 / 92

Party flag

Website
- www.PLC.org.ni

The Constitutionalist Liberal Party (Spanish: Partido Liberal Constitucionalista, PLC) is a political party in Nicaragua.

== History ==
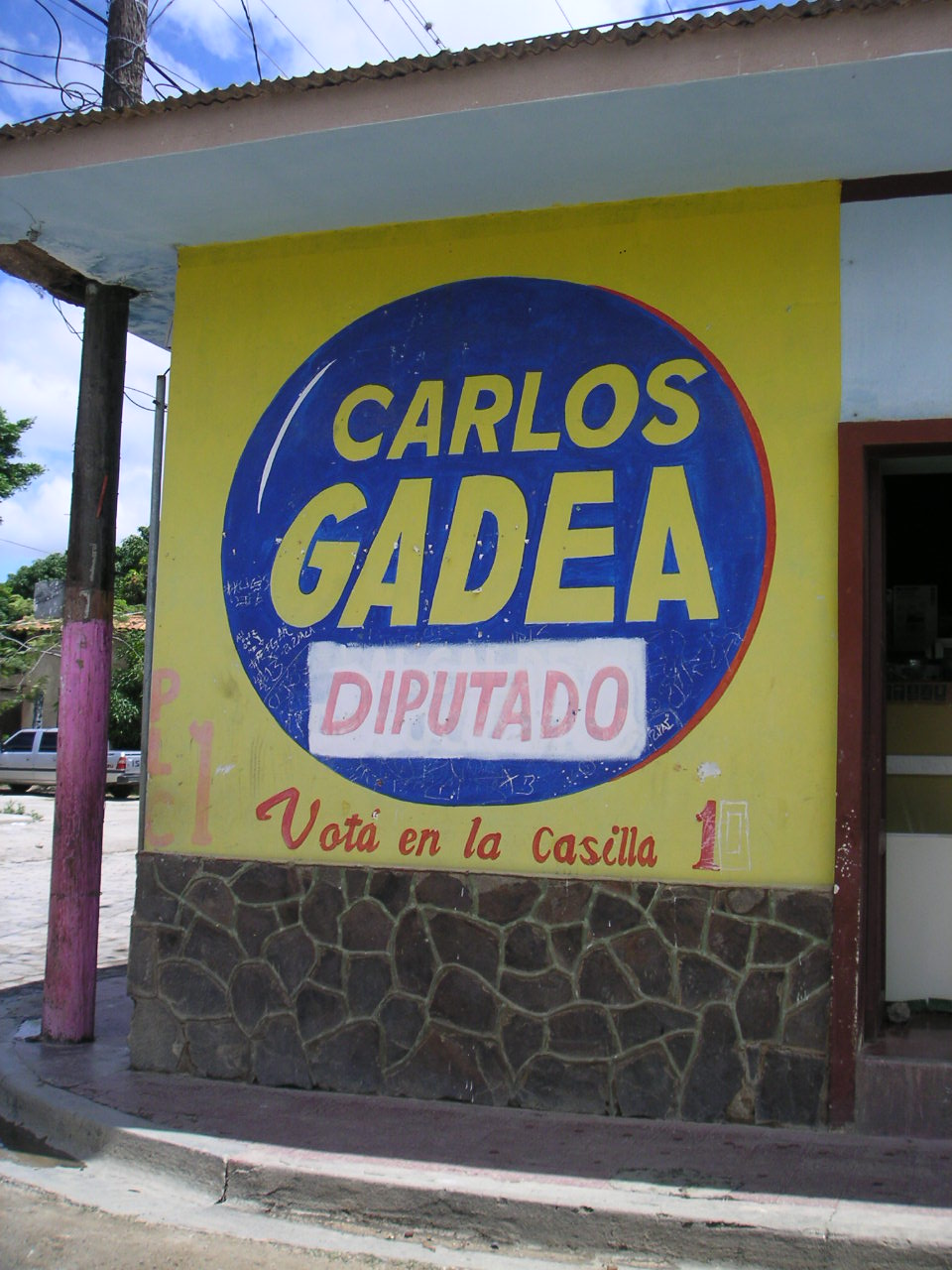
PLC mural in Ocotal

The Constitutionalist Liberal Party is the political successor of the Democratic Party, a faction which has existed since Nicaragua became independent during the 1830s. After being defeated by the Legitimists (future members of the Conservative Party) in a civil war in the 1850s, the Democratic Party returned to power in 1893 under President José Santos Zelaya, who lost power in 1909.

Under pressure from American troops who had occupied Nicaragua, the Democrats lost power the following year, and remained out of power until 1926 when, following another revolt, they forced the Conservatives into a coalition government. Some factions of the Democratic Party, along with some factions of the Conservative Party, supported Anastasio Somoza García, who gained power in the 1930s, defeating another Democratic faction led by Augusto Sandino, who continued fighting after the 1926 coalition agreement. The Democrats and Conservatives were both marginalized by the Somoza family, who formed the Nationalist Liberal Party, and continued to be out of power when the Somozas were overthrown by the Sandinista National Liberation Front in 1979.

In 1968, Ramiro Sacasa Guerro, a relative of the Somozas and education minister, opposed Anastasio Somoza Debayle's re-election bid and formed the Constitutionalist Liberal Movement (MLC) faction within the Nationalist Liberal Party. The formation of this faction, which believed in opposing Somoza by political means instead of through armed struggle, led to Somoza dismissing Sacasa from his position. After the Sandinista victory in 1979, the MLC earned a seat on the Council of State which was founded following the end of Somoza's rule, but that seat was soon revoked following the FSLN's accusations of the MLC's lack of representation. After Sacasa's death in a car accident, the MLC became a political party in 1983, and again gained a seat in the Council of State, occupied by Public Prosecutor Julio Centeno.

The Democratic Party had by this time split into many Liberal groups, many of whom supported the National Opposition Union (UNO) which successfully opposed the Sandinistas in the 1990 elections. By the late 1990s, led by Arnoldo Alemán, most of the Democratic/Liberal groups consolidated to form the Constitutionalist Liberal Party, which was at first known as the Liberal Alliance. In 1996 Alemán won the presidential election and served as president until 2002, while the party won 42 of the 93 seats in the 1996 congressional elections, more than any other party. At the November 2001 elections, the party gained a majority in Congress, winning 47 of 92 seats. The same day, its candidate Enrique Bolaños won the presidential elections.

Though still a strong force in Nicaragua, there have been many disputes within it since 2001 which, by 2006, had caused it to lose its majority in Congress and the presidency. Bolaños broke with the PLC to form the Alliance for the Republic. José Rizo was nominated as the presidential candidate and José Antonio Alvarado was nominated as the vice-presidential candidate for the November 2006 elections. Eduardo Montealegre, another presidential candidate for the elections, was a former member of the Constitutionalist Liberal Party and formed the Nicaraguan Liberal Alliance which includes other former PLC members. Montealegre and Rizo were both defeated, as Sandinista Daniel Ortega finished far enough ahead of both of them to avoid a runoff. Rizo came in third place with 26% of the vote. The party came in second place in the congressional elections, winning 25 of 92 seats in the National Assembly.

The party was a member of the Liberal International, but left that organization in 2005.

For the 2011 Nicaraguan general election, the PLC nominated Arnoldo Alemán for president again, who had been acquitted for fraud and corruption charges, after nobody else ran in the party's primaries. Alemán was able to collect 80,000 signatures in support of his candidacy. With Alemán as the PLC's candidate for president, the party went on to have its worst electoral result ever since it started participating in elections in 1990, ending up with slightly under 6% of the votes. In the National Assembly, the party lost 23 seats.

For the 2016 Nicaraguan general election, the party nominated congressman Maximino Rodríguez for the presidency, who distanced himself from former president Alemán. Rodríguez had said that "there were no conditions to hold elections", but ultimately decided to participate in the elections anyway. The party had a better showing in these elections, winning slightly over 15% of the votes.

In the lead-up to the 2021 Nicaraguan general election, the party registered Walter Espinoza as its presidential candidate, following a controversial series of events. Espinoza had been involved with the PLC ever since the 1990s, starting in the party's youth wing. Initially, Espinoza participated in the party's primary elections but later withdrew his nomination. Subsequently, he supported PLC leader María Haydée Osuna in requesting the cancellation of the Citizens for Liberty party's legal status, a move that effectively eliminated Nicaragua's only significant opposition party. This led to the resignation of the PLC's original candidate, Milton Arcia, in protest, after which Espinoza was registered as the new candidate. Espinoza ultimately received over 14% of the votes, in an election that was regarded by international observers as a sham.

== Electoral history ==
=== Presidential elections ===
Election	Party candidate	Votes	%	Result
1990	Violeta Chamorro	777,552	54.74%	Elected ✓
1996	Arnoldo Alemán	896,207	50.99%	Elected ✓
2001	Enrique Bolaños	1,228,412	56.31%	Elected ✓
2006	José Rizo Castellón	588,304	26.21%	Lost ✗
2011	Arnoldo Alemán	148,507	5.91%	Lost ✗
2016	Maximino Rodríguez	374,898	15.03%	Lost ✗
2021	Walter Espinoza	395,406	14.33%	Lost ✗

== See also ==
- List of major liberal parties considered right
