= Nicaraguan Revolution =

1961–1990 anti-Somoza revolution and Sandinista rule

- Part of the Central American crisis and the Cold War in Latin America
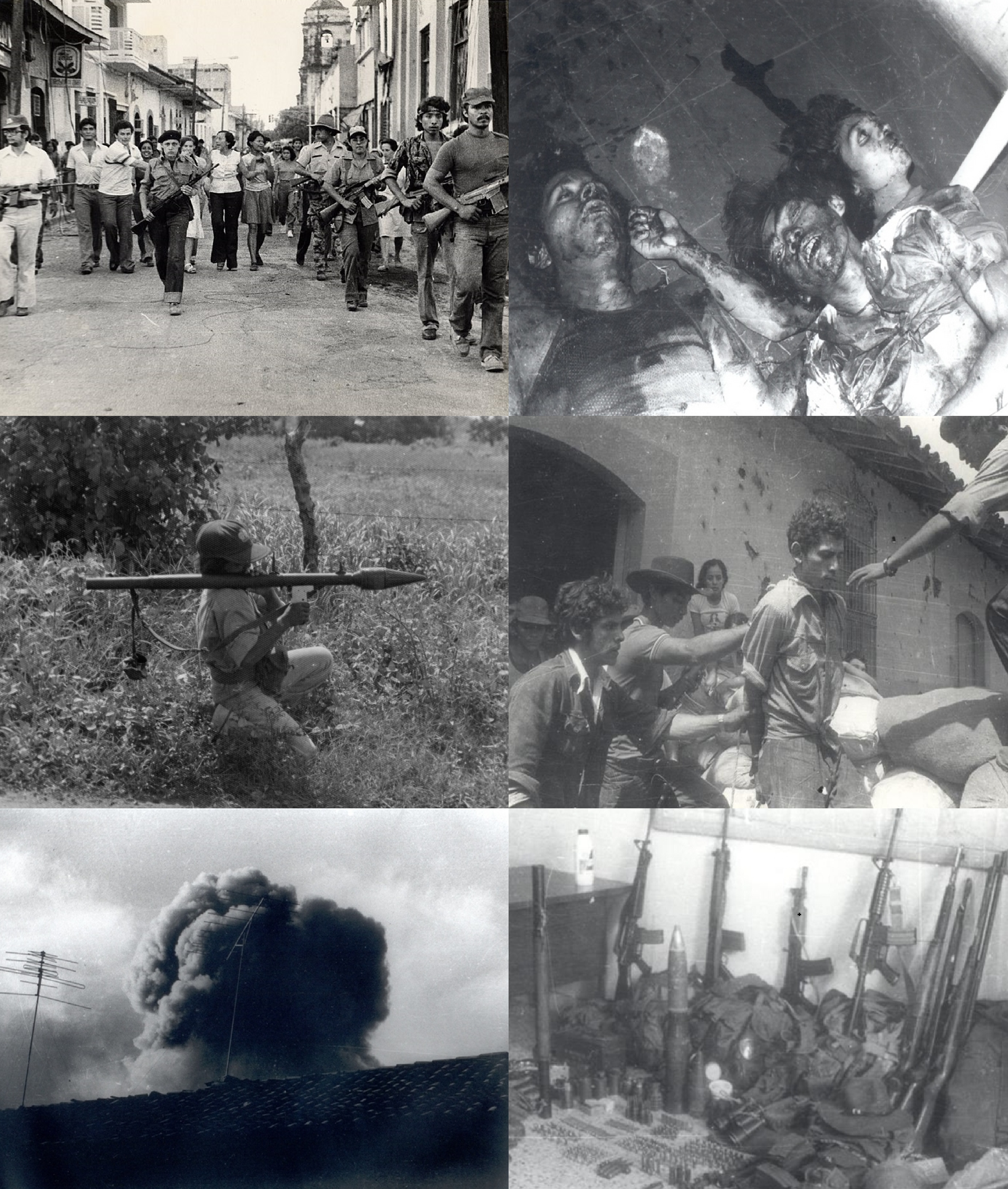
- From top to bottom and left to right: Sandinistas entering León in June 1979; Executions carried out in Fortín de Acosasco; A combatant aiming an RPG-2; A government spy captured by rebels; Aerial bombing by the National Guard; Weapons seized by guerrilla forces
Date	19 July 1961 – 25 April 1990 19 July 1961 – 17 July 1979 (first phase: FSLN rebellion) 17 July 1979 – 25 April 1990 (second phase: Contra insurgency)
Location	Nicaragua
Result	Anastasio Somoza Debayle resigns and flees to the United States in July 1979, relinquishing control of the government.; A five-member provisional government takes its place.; The right-wing Contras begin an armed insurgency against the Sandinistas in 1981 which continues until 1990.; The Tela Accord is signed in 1989 and the Sandinista party is defeated in the 1990 election, bringing the armed revolution to an end.; Sandinistas led by Daniel Ortega are re-elected in 2006 and remain in power until today.

Belligerents
(Nicaragua) Somoza regime (1961–1979): National Guard; Contras (1981–1990): FDN; UDN; ARDE; MILPAS; Fifteenth of September Legion; KISAN/YATAMA; Supported by: United States: CIA; Honduras (from 1981) Other supporters: El Salvador; Guatemala (from 1983); Costa Rica (1982–1986); Panama (1981–1987, under Manuel Noriega); Chile (from 1973); Argentina (1976–1983); Israel; Saudi Arabia; Imperial State of Iran (until 1979); Islamic Republic of Iran (from 1979, indirectly); China (allegedly); Poland (allegedly); Romania; Taiwan; Colombia; Brazil; Portugal; Brunei	Sandinista National Liberation Front: Junta of National Reconstruction/Nicaraguan Government (from 1979); Sandinista Popular Army; MAP-ML (1978–1979); MILPAS; Panama (1978–1979, under Omar Torrijos) Supported by: Cuba: Dirección de Inteligencia; Soviet Union Other supporters: East Germany (until 1989); Yugoslavia; Hungary (until 1989); Libya; North Korea; Bulgaria; Czechoslovakia (until 1989); Palestine Liberation Organization; Poland (until 1989); Algeria; France; Costa Rica (1978–1982); Mexico; Sweden (medical support); Canada (1984–1990, developmental aid); Venezuela (1978–1979); Chile (1970-1973)

Commanders and leaders
(Nicaragua) Anastasio Somoza Debayle X; Luis Somoza Debayle #; Anastasio Somoza Portocarrero; Enrique Bermúdez X; Edén Pastora (1982–1986); Édgar Chamorro; Alfonso Robelo (1982–1988); Fernando Chamorro (1981–1987); Adolfo Calero; Aristides Sánchez	Daniel Ortega; Bayardo Arce; Carlos Fonseca Amador †; Edén Pastora; Dora María Téllez; Tomás Borge; Humberto Ortega; Joaquín Cuadra; Henry Ruiz; (Panama) Hugo Spadafora X

Strength
1978–1979: 15,000 1981–1990: 16,500: 10,000–15,000 FDN	1978–1979: 20,000: 5,000 guerrillas; 15,000 militia; 1981–1990: 60,000: 40,000 EPS; 20,000 militia; (Cuba) 3,000 military advisors More: 340 tanks and armored fighting vehicles; 70 Soviet howitzers and rocket launchers; 30 helicopters (including Soviet Mi-24 gunships); 15 patrol boats

Casualties and losses
1978–1979: 425–1,200 National Guard dead; 1981–1990: 16,800–18,500 Contras dead; 5,900 wounded and captured	1978–1979: 2,000–6,000 FSLN dead; 500–1,000 POWs killed; 1981–1990: 2,500–6,500 FSLN dead; 6,500 wounded; 950 captured
- 1978–1979 offensive: 10,000–50,000 killed (up to 7,000 civilians) 1981–1990: 32,000–43,000 killed (3,800 civilians reported dead) Total: 42,000–78,000 killed (incl. 4,000–22,000 civilians)
- More than 600,000 left homeless and 150,000 refugees fled to Costa Rica, Honduras, and the United States.

The Nicaraguan Revolution (Spanish: Revolución nicaragüense), or Sandinista Revolution (Revolución popular sandinista, 'Sandinista People's Revolution') was an armed conflict that took place in the Central American country of Nicaragua between 1961 and 1990.

It began with rising opposition to the Somoza dictatorship in the 1960s and 1970s, the overthrow of the dictatorship in 1978–1979, and fighting between the new government and the Contras from 1981 to 1990. The revolution revealed the country as one of the major proxy war battlegrounds of the Cold War.

The initial overthrow of the Somoza dictatorial regime in 1978–79 cost thousands of lives, with major battles and insurrections taking place in Managua, León, Estelí, and Masaya. The Contra War of the 1980s that followed took tens of thousands more and was the subject of fierce international debate.

Because of the political turmoil, failing economy, and limited influence of the new socialist government, both the Sandinista Army, the armed wing of the FSLN government that was supported by the Soviet Union, and the Contras, a newly-formed resistance movement supported by the U.S., fought a bloody insurgency that may have taken more lives than the overthrow of the Somoza regime itself.

In 1988, a peace process began with the Sapoá Accords, and the Contra War ended the following year following the signing of the Tela Accord and demobilization of the FSLN and Contra armies. A second election in 1990 resulted in the election of the UNO, which the Sandinistas lost. The Sandinistas were out of power in Nicaragua until 2006.

== Background ==
=== Somoza dictatorship ===
Following the United States occupation of Nicaragua from 1912 to 1933 during the Banana Wars, a hereditary military dictatorship led by the Somoza family took power, and ruled from 1937 until its collapse in 1979. The Somoza dynasty consisted of Anastasio Somoza García, his eldest son Luis Somoza Debayle, and finally Anastasio Somoza Debayle. The Somoza era was characterized by economic development, albeit with rising inequality and political corruption, strong US support for the government and its military, as well as a reliance on US-based multinational corporations.

=== Sandinista National Liberation Front ===
In 1961, Carlos Fonseca Amador, Silvio Mayorga, and Tomás Borge Martínez formed the Sandinista National Liberation Front (FSLN) with other student activists at the Universidad Nacional Autonoma de Nicaragua (UNAN) in Managua. The founders were experienced activists. Amador, first General Secretary, had worked with others on a newspaper "broadly critical" of the Somoza family titled Segovia.

Consisting of approximately 20 members during the 1960s, with the help of students, FSLN gathered support from peasants and anti-Somoza elements, as well as from the communist Cuban government, the socialist Panamanian government of Omar Torrijos, and the social democratic Venezuelan government of Carlos Andrés Pérez.

By the 1970s, the coalition of students, farmers, businesses, churches, and a small percentage of Marxists was strong enough to launch a military effort against the regime of Anastasio Somoza Debayle. The FSLN focused on guerrilla tactics, inspired by Fidel Castro and Ché Guevara. They launched an unsuccessful campaign in 1963 known as the Raití-Bocay campaign in rural, northern Jinotega Department, where "when guerrillas did encounter the National Guard, they had to retreat...with heavy losses." Further operations included a devastating loss near the city of Matagalpa, during which Mayorga was killed. During this time, FSLN reduced attacks, instead focusing on solidifying the organization.

Fonseca died in combat in November 1976. The FSLN then split into three factions that fought separately: the Maoist Tendencia GPP ("Guerra Popular Prolongada" or Prolonged People's War), the Marxist-Leninist Tendencia Proletaria ("Proletarian Faction"), and the Left-wing nationalist Tendencia Tercerista ("Third Faction"). The latter was the most popular and was led by Daniel Ortega, who eventually became the FSLN's General Secretary in 1984.

==== Cuban assistance ====
Cuban intervention in Nicaragua under the leadership of Fidel Castro was critical in the military success of the FSLN. The arms, funding, and intelligence that the Sandinistas received from the Cuban government helped them overcome the National Guard's superior training and experience. Castro's support of the revolution at the same time the Somoza government (and later the Contras) received help from the U.S. is one reason why the conflict is considered a proxy war of the Cold War.

== Revolution ==
In the 1970s, FSLN began a campaign of kidnappings, which led to national recognition of the group in the Nicaraguan media and solidification of the perception of the group as a threat. The ruling regime, which included the Nicaraguan National Guard, trained and influenced by the U.S. military, declared a state of siege, and proceeded to use torture, rape, extrajudicial killings, intimidation and press censorship in order to combat the FSLN attacks. This led to international condemnation of the regime and in 1978 the US cut off aid over its human rights violations. In response, Somoza lifted the state of siege.

Other opposition parties and movements began to consolidate. In 1974, the Unión Democrática Liberal (UDEL; English: Union for Democratic Liberation) was founded by Pedro Joaquín Chamorro Cardenal, editor of the Managua newspaper La Prensa. The alliance included two anti-Somoza liberal parties as well as conservatives and the Nicaraguan Socialist Party.

On 10 January 1978, Cardenal was murdered, allegedly by the Somoza regime, and riots broke out in Managua targeting the Somoza regime. Following the riots, a general strike on 23–24 January called for the end of the Somoza regime and was successful at shutting down around 80% of businesses in Managua and the provincial capitals of León, Granada, Chinandega, and Matagalpa.

In the words of William Dewy, a Citibank employee who witnessed the Managua riots:

"Our offices at the time were directly across the street from La Prensa and in the fighting that followed part of our branch was burned, but not intentionally. They were going after the Somoza-owned bank. In the turmoil they torched the [Somoza] bank and our building also burnt down. It was clear [to the U.S. business community] that the Chamorro assassination had changed things dramatically and permanently for the worse." — Interview with Morris H. Morley, 17 October 1987

On 22 August 1978 the FSLN staged a massive kidnapping operation. Led by Éden Pastora, the Sandinista forces captured the National Palace while the legislature was in session, taking 2,000 hostages. Pastora demanded money, the release of Sandinista prisoners, and "a means of publicizing the Sandinista cause." After two days, the government agreed to pay $500,000 and to release certain prisoners, a major victory for the FSLN. Revolts against the state and guerrilla warfare continued.

In early 1979 the Organization of American States supervised negotiations between the FSLN and the government. However, these broke down when it became clear that the Somoza regime had no intention of allowing democratic elections.

By June 1979, following a successful urban offensive, the FSLN militarily controlled all of the country except the capital. On 17 July, Somoza Debayle resigned, and on 19 July the FSLN entered Managua. Somoza Debayle fled to Miami, ceding control to the revolutionary movement. His Nationalist Liberal Party became practically defunct, and many government functionaries and business figures overtly compromised with somocismo chose exile. The Catholic church and the professional sectors generally approved of the new reality.

== Sandinista government ==
Immediately following the fall of the Somoza regime, Nicaragua lay largely in ruins. The country had suffered both a bloody war and the 1972 Nicaragua earthquake just 6 years earlier. In 1979, approximately 600,000 Nicaraguans were homeless and 150,000 more were either refugees or in exile, out of a total population of 2.8 million.

In response, a state of emergency was declared. The US sent US$99 million in aid. Land and businesses of the Somoza regime were expropriated, the courts were abolished, and workers were organized into Civil Defense Committees. The new regime declared that "elections are unnecessary", which led to criticism from the Catholic Church and others.

=== Agrarian reform ===
The Somoza family had managed to build and rebuild Managua into a large, modern city during the 20th century, but it was surrounded by an almost semifeudal rural economy with few productive outputs outside of cotton, sugar and other agricultural products. All sectors of the economy of Nicaragua were determined, in great part, by the Somozas or their supporters, whether by directly owning agricultural brands/trusts, or actively choosing their owners (local or foreign). Somoza Debayle himself was (incorrectly) alleged to have owned 1/5 of all profitable land in Nicaragua. Somoza and his people owned and gave away banks, ports, communications services and massive amounts of land. Women also played a large role in the agrarian reform.

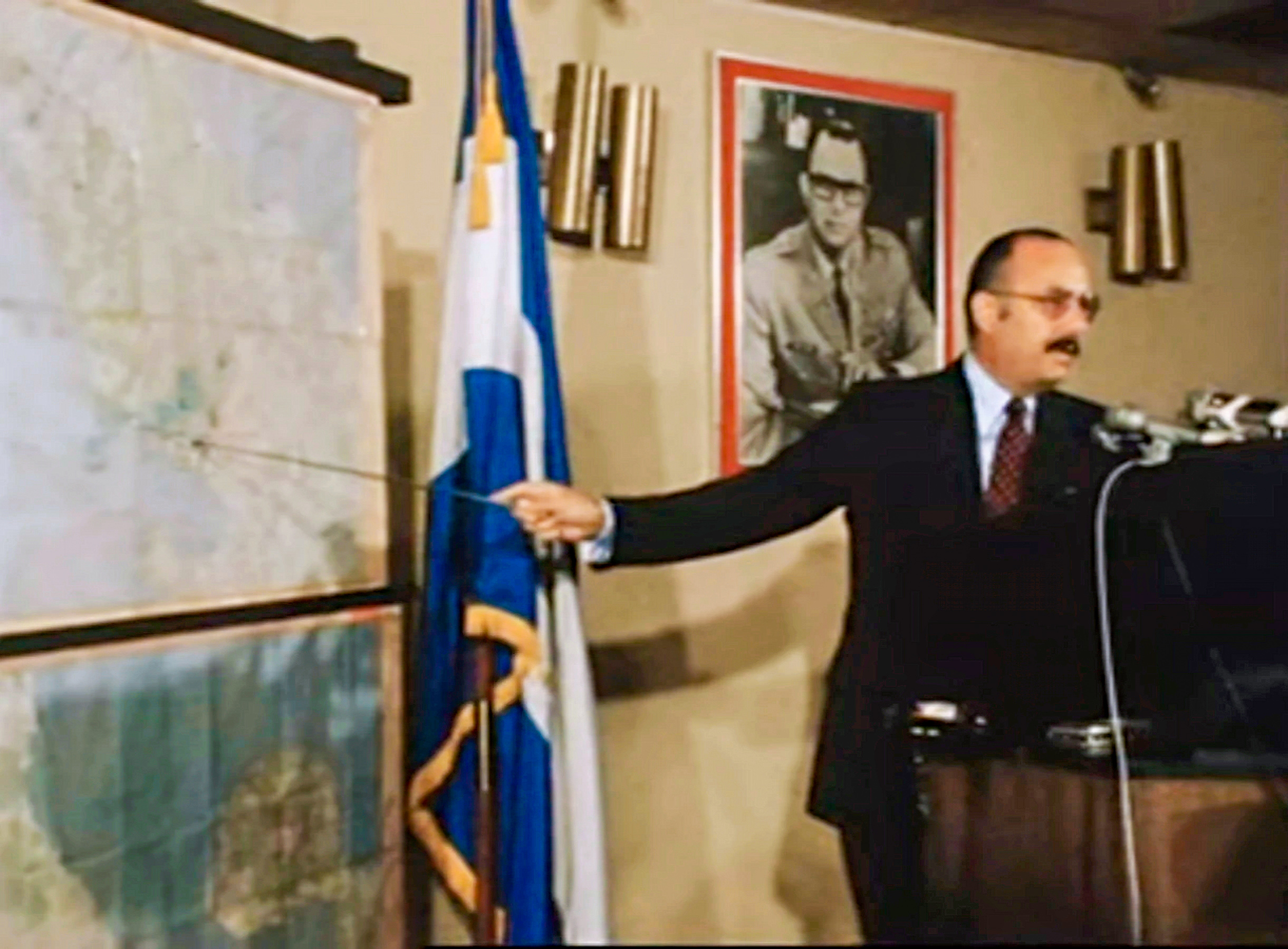
Somoza Debayle during a press conference in 1979

The Nicaraguan Revolution brought immense restructuring to all three sectors of the economy, directing it towards a mixed economy. The biggest economic impact was on agriculture, in the form of agrarian reform, which was proposed as a process that would develop pragmatically along with other changes (economic, political, etc.).

Economic reforms overall needed to restart the economy. As a developing country, Nicaragua had an agriculture-based economy, susceptible to commodity market prices. The rural economy was far behind in technology and devastated by the guerrilla warfare.

Article 1 of the Agrarian Reform Law says that property is guaranteed if it is used efficiently and described different forms of property:

- state property (confiscated land from Somocistas)
- cooperative property (confiscated land, but without individual certificates of ownership, to be used efficiently)
- communal property (for people and communities from Miskito regions in the Atlantic)
- individual property (as long as it was efficiently used and integrated to national development plans)

The principles that defined the reform matched those of the Revolution: pluralism, national unity, and economic democracy.

Agrarian reform developed in four phases:

- 1st phase (1979): confiscation of property owned by Somocistas and its partners
- 2nd phase (1981): Agrarian Reform Law of 19 July 1981
- 3rd phase (1984–85): massive cession of land individually
- 4th phase (1986): Agrarian Reform Law of 1986, or "reform to the 1981 Law"

In 1985, the Agrarian Reform distributed 950 square kilometres (235,000 acres) of land to the peasantry. This represented about 75 percent of all land distributed to peasants since 1980. The reform had the twofold purpose of increasing support for the government among the campesinos, and guaranteeing ample food delivery into the cities. During 1985, ceremonies were held throughout the countryside in which Daniel Ortega gave each peasant title to land and a rifle to defend it.

By 1990 the agrarian reform had affected half of the country's arable land benefiting some 60% of rural families. "By 1990 the majority of farms were in the hands of small and medium size producers, in contrast to the historic maldistribution of land going back to the colonial times."

=== Cultural revolution ===
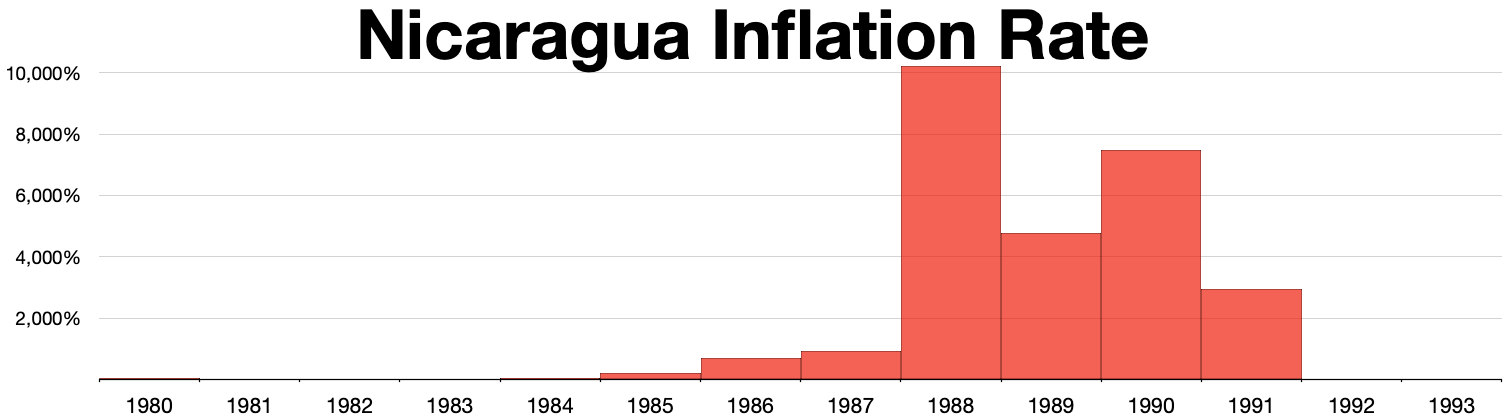
The inflation rate of the córdoba rose to over 10,000% in 1988, leading to rationing

The Revolution brought many cultural developments. The Nicaraguan Literacy Campaign (Cruzada Nacional de Alfabetización) focused on high school and university students drafting teachers as volunteer teachers. Within five months they claimed to have reduced the overall illiteracy rate from 50.3% to 12.9%. In September 1980, UNESCO awarded Nicaragua the "Nadezhda K. Krupskaya" award. This was followed by literacy campaigns of 1982, 1986, 1987, 1995 and 2000, each of which was also awarded by UNESCO.

The Sandinistas established a Ministry of Culture, one of only three in Latin America at the time, and established a new editorial brand, called Editorial Nueva Nicaragua and, based on it, started to print cheap editions of basic books rarely seen by Nicaraguans. It founded an Instituto de Estudios del Sandinismo (Institute for Studies of Sandinismo) where it printed the work and papers of Augusto C. Sandino and those that reflected the ideologies of the FSLN, such as Carlos Fonseca and Ricardo Morales Avilés.

Such programs received international recognition for improving literacy, health care, education, childcare, unions, and land reform.

=== Health care ===
Health conditions in Somoza era Nicaragua were abysmal according to a report published in The New England Journal of Medicine, "under Somoza health conditions had been worse than in neighboring countries with 35% of the urban and 95% of the rural population lacking access to potable water and only about 10% of the population receiving adequate medical care. 1/3 of the people contracted malaria at least once in their lives and 46-83% of the children were malnourished. Life expectancy at the time of the revolution was 52.9 years, infant mortality was between 120-140/1000. Since July 1979, however, about 70% of the people have regular medical care and health care education campaigns are widespread. Public health programs have administered vaccinations to thousands of children and literacy programs have incorporated elementary health principles into their curricula."

According to a 1984 report from the American Journal of Public Health, "it is estimated that, between 1978 and 1983, infant mortality decreased from 121 to 80.2 per 1,000 live births, life expectancy at birth rose from 52 to 59 years. The number of reported malaria cases has decreased by 50 per cent, polio cases have not been reported for two years, no measles cases were reported in the first half of 1984, and most other immunization preventable diseases are considerably reduced. Diarrhea has fallen from the first to the fourth most common cause of hospital mortality." Under-five mortality was also reduced by half during the Contra war. The gains in health and in other areas were so great that, to quote the aforementioned NEJM report, "in just 3 years more has been done in most areas of social welfare than in the 50 years of Somoza dictatorship and these efforts indicate a profound change in Nicaraguan society."

Cuba also played an important role by again offering expertise to Nicaragua on this front. Over 1,500 Cuban doctors worked in the country and provided more than five million consultations. Cuban personnel were essential in the elimination of polio, the decrease in whooping cough, rubella, and measles, and the lowering of the infant mortality rate. Gary Prevost states that Cuban personnel made it possible for Nicaragua to have a national health care system that reached the majority of its citizens.

=== Human rights controversies ===
Amnesty International noted numerous human rights violations by the Sandinista government. They contended that civilians "disappeared" after their arrest, that "civil and political rights" were suspended, due process was denied detainees, detainees were tortured, and "reports of the killing by government forces of those suspected of supporting the contras".

The Sandinistas were accused of committing mass executions. The Inter-American Commission on Human Rights investigated abuses by Sandinista forces, including an execution of 35 to 40 Miskitos in December 1981, and an execution of 75 people in November 1984. The Los Angeles Times noted that "...the Miskitos began to actively oppose the Sandinistas in 1982 when authorities killed more than a dozen Indians, burned villages, forcibly recruited young men into the army and tried to relocate others. Thousands of Miskitos poured across the Coco into Honduras, and many took up arms to oppose the Nicaraguan government."

The Heritage Foundation, a conservative American think tank with close ties to the Ronald Reagan administration, charged the Sandinista government with human rights violations, including press censorship. It charged that the government censored the independent newspaper La Prensa. French journalist Viktor Dedaj, who lived in Managua in the 1980s, contended that La Prensa was generally sold freely and that the majority of radio stations were anti-Sandinista. The Heritage Foundation claimed that the Sandinistas instituted a "spy on your neighbor" system that encouraged citizens to report any activity deemed counter-revolutionary, with those reported facing harassment from security representatives, including the destruction of property. Heritage also criticized the government for its treatment of the Miskito people, stating that over 15,000 Miskitos were forced to relocate, that their villages were destroyed, and that their killers were promoted rather than punished.

The United Nations, the Organization of American States and Pax Christi disputed Heritage's allegations of anti-Semitism. According to them, individual Nicaraguan Jews had their property expropriated due to their connections with the Somoza regime, rather than because they were Jewish. They cited the fact that there were prominent Sandinista officials of Jewish descent. In contrast to these organizations, the Anti-Defamation League supported allegations of Sandinista antisemitism. It worked closely with Nicaraguan Jewish exiles to reclaim a synagogue that had been firebombed by Sandinista militants in 1978 and expropriated in 1979.

== Contra war ==
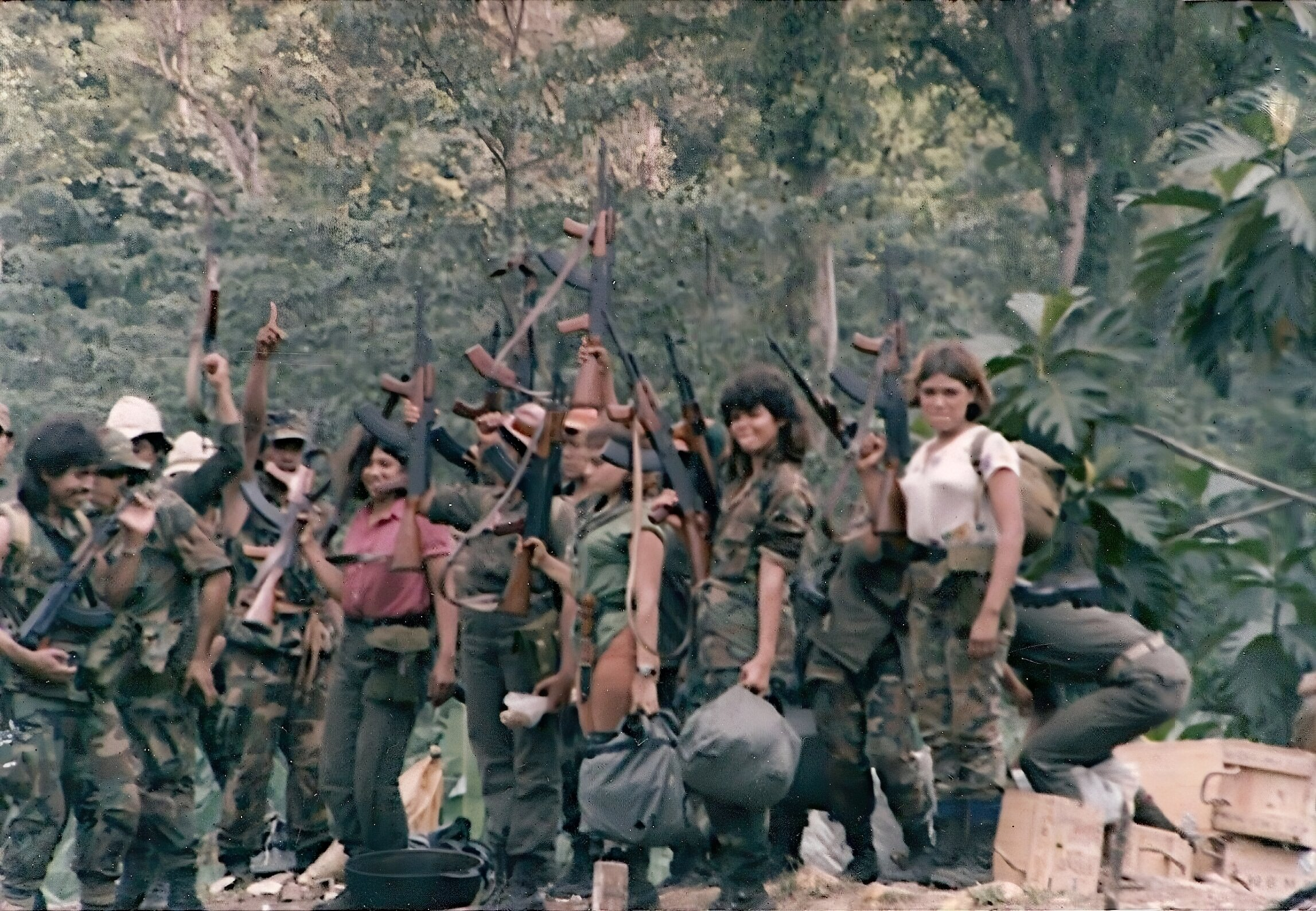
Contra group from FDN and ARDE Frente Sur in the Nueva Guinea area in 1987

The Carter Administration attempted to work with FSLN in 1979 and 1980, while the Reagan Administration supported an anti-communist strategy for dealing with Latin America, and attempted to isolate the Sandinista regime economically and politically. As early as 1980–1981, anti-Sandinista forces known as Contras began forming along the Honduras–Nicaragua border. Many of the initial Contras were former members of Somoza's National Guard and still loyal to him, then in exile in Honduras.

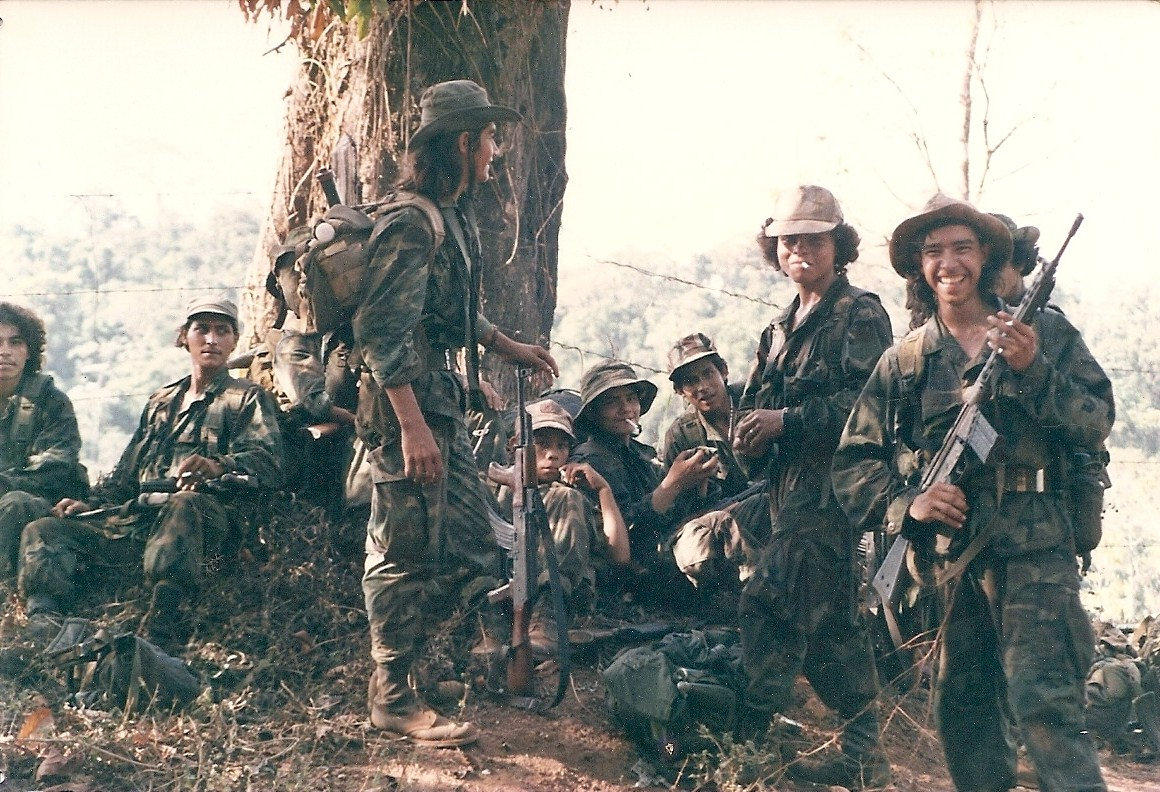
Contras taking a break after routing an FSLN garrison

In addition to Contra units loyal to Somoza, the FSLN began to face opposition from members of ethnic minority groups that inhabited Nicaragua's remote Mosquito Coast region along the Caribbean. These groups were demanding self-determination, autonomy, and freedom from persecution, but the FSLN refused to grant these and began using forced relocations and armed force in response.

Upon taking office in January 1981, Reagan cancelled U.S. economic aid to Nicaragua, and on 6 August 1981 he signed National Security Decision Directive 7, which authorized the production and shipment of arms to the region but not their deployment. On 17 November 1981, President Reagan signed National Security Directive 17, authorizing covert support to anti-Sandinista forces.

Armed conflict soon erupted, further destabilizing the region upset by civil wars in El Salvador and Guatemala. The CIA-backed Contras secretly opened a "second front" on Nicaragua's eastern coast and Costa Rican border. As the civil war opened cracks in the national revolutionary project, FSLN's military budget grew to more than half of the government's annual budget. A compulsory draft called the Servicio Militar Patriótico (Patriotic Military Service) was also established.

By 1982, Contra forces had begun carrying out assassinations of members of the Nicaraguan government, and by 1983 the Contras had launched a major offensive. The CIA was helping them to plant mines in Nicaragua harbors to inhibit foreign weapons shipments. The 1987 Iran–Contra affair placed the Reagan Administration again at the center of secret support for the Contras.

=== 1984 general election ===
The 1984 Nicaraguan general election took place on 4 November. Of the 1,551,597 citizens registered in July, 1,170,142 voted (75.4%). Null votes were 6% of the total. International observers declared the elections "free and fair", although the Reagan administration denounced it as a "Soviet style sham". The national share of valid votes for president were:

Party	% of vote received	Presidential candidate
Sandinista National Liberation Front	67%	Daniel Ortega
Democratic Conservative Party	14%	Clemente Guido
Independent Liberal Party	9.6%	Virgilio Godoy
Popular Social Christian Party	5.6%	Mauricio Díaz
Communist Party of Nicaragua	1.5%	Allan Zambrana
Nicaraguan Socialist Party	1.3%	Domingo Sánchez Salgado
Marxist–Leninist Popular Action Movement	1%	Isidro Téllez

=== Esquipulas Peace Agreement ===
The Esquipulas Peace Agreement was a mid-1980s initiative to settle the military conflicts that had plagued Central America for years, sometimes decades. It built upon groundwork laid by the Contadora Group from 1983 to 1985. The agreement was named for Esquipulas, Guatemala, where the initial meetings took place. US Congress efforts were helped by Capitol Hill lobbyist William C. Chasey.

In May 1986, summit meeting Esquipulas I took place, attended by the five Central American presidents. On 15 February 1987, Costa Rican President Óscar Arias submitted a Peace Plan that evolved from this meeting. During 1986 and 1987, the Esquipulas Process was established, in which the Central American heads of state agreed on economic cooperation and a framework for peaceful conflict resolution. The Esquipulas II Accord emerged from this and was signed in Guatemala City by the five presidents on 7 August 1987.

Esquipulas II defined measures to promote national reconciliation, an end to hostilities, democratization, free elections, the termination of all assistance to irregular forces, negotiations on arms controls, and assistance to refugees. It laid the ground for international verification procedures and provided a timetable for implementation.

The Sapoá Accords, held on 23 March 1988, represented the beginning of a peace process in Nicaragua. The name of the accords comes from Sapoá, a Nicaraguan town near the border with Costa Rica. Sandinismo in 1988 was coming to an end as the Soviet Union began limiting its support. This in turn limited Sandinista government options to continue the conflict, forcing them to negotiate for peace. The accord was mediated by João Clemente Baena Soares at the time as Secretary General of the Organization of American States and then Archbishop of Managua Miguel Obando y Bravo Management of the peace process relied on Soviet ambassador Vaino Väljas' mediation (based on recent US-Soviet agreements), since the U.S. did not have an Ambassador to Nicaragua from 1 July 1987 until 4 May 1988.

=== National Opposition Union (UNO) ===
Since the very moment of inception, under the political guidance and technical and financial support from the government of the U.S., the existence of UNO was marked by grave structural deformations, derived from its own nature. In its conformation concurred the most diverse currents of the Nicaraguan political and ideological range: from the liberal-conservative -traditionally anticommunist and pro-U.S., to Marxist-Leninists from moscovian lineage, openly declared supporters of class struggle and enemies of capitalism in its superior development stage.

— Roberto J. Cajina

In the 1990 Nicaraguan general election, the UNO Coalition included:

- 3 Liberal factions: PLI, PLC and PALI
- 3 Conservative: ANC, PNC and APC
- 3 Social-Christians: PPSC, PDCN and PAN
- 2 Social democrats: PSD and MDN
- 2 Communists: PSN (pro-Moscow) and PC de Nicaragua (pro-Albania)
- 1 Central American Unionist: PIAC

=== Maps of Contra activity ===
Militias in Nicaragua (1984–1988)
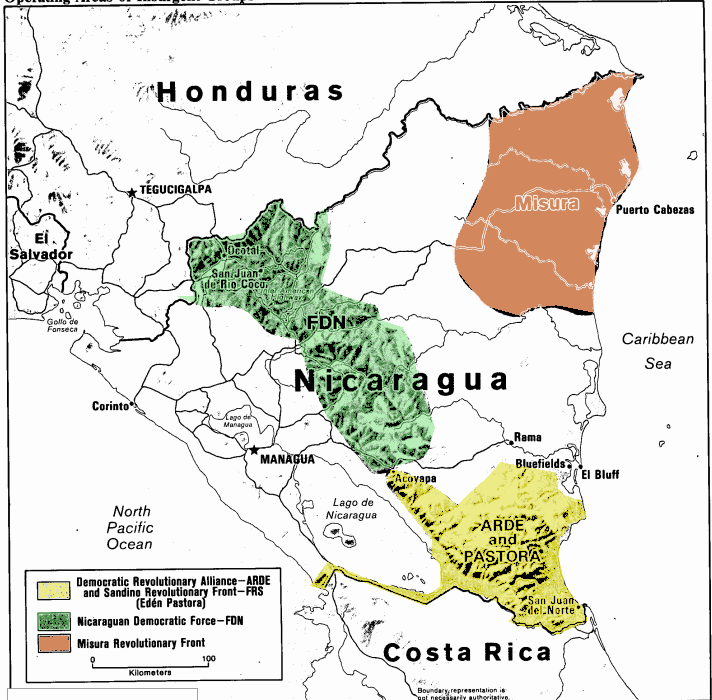
1984

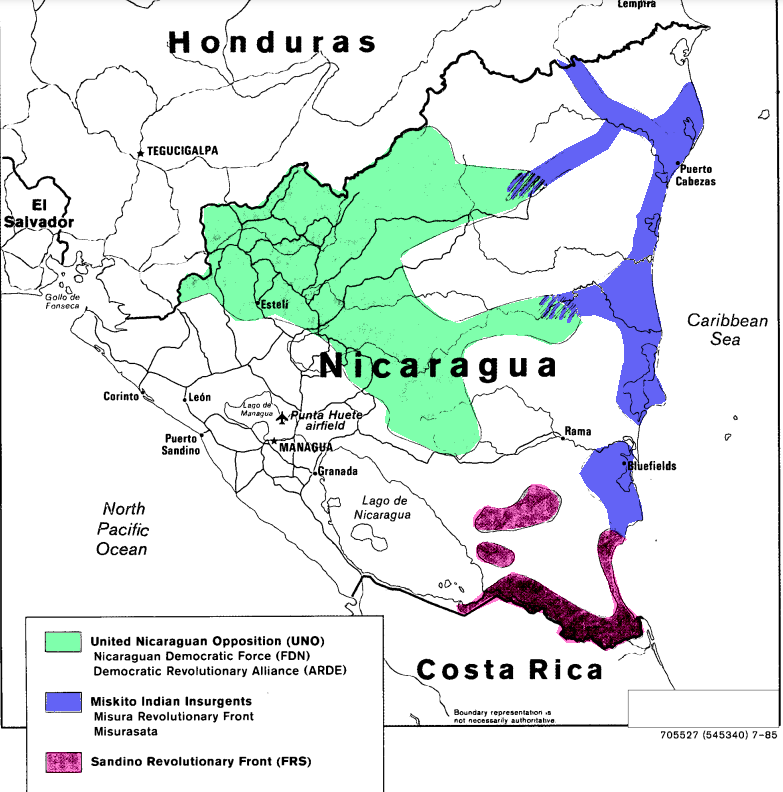
1985

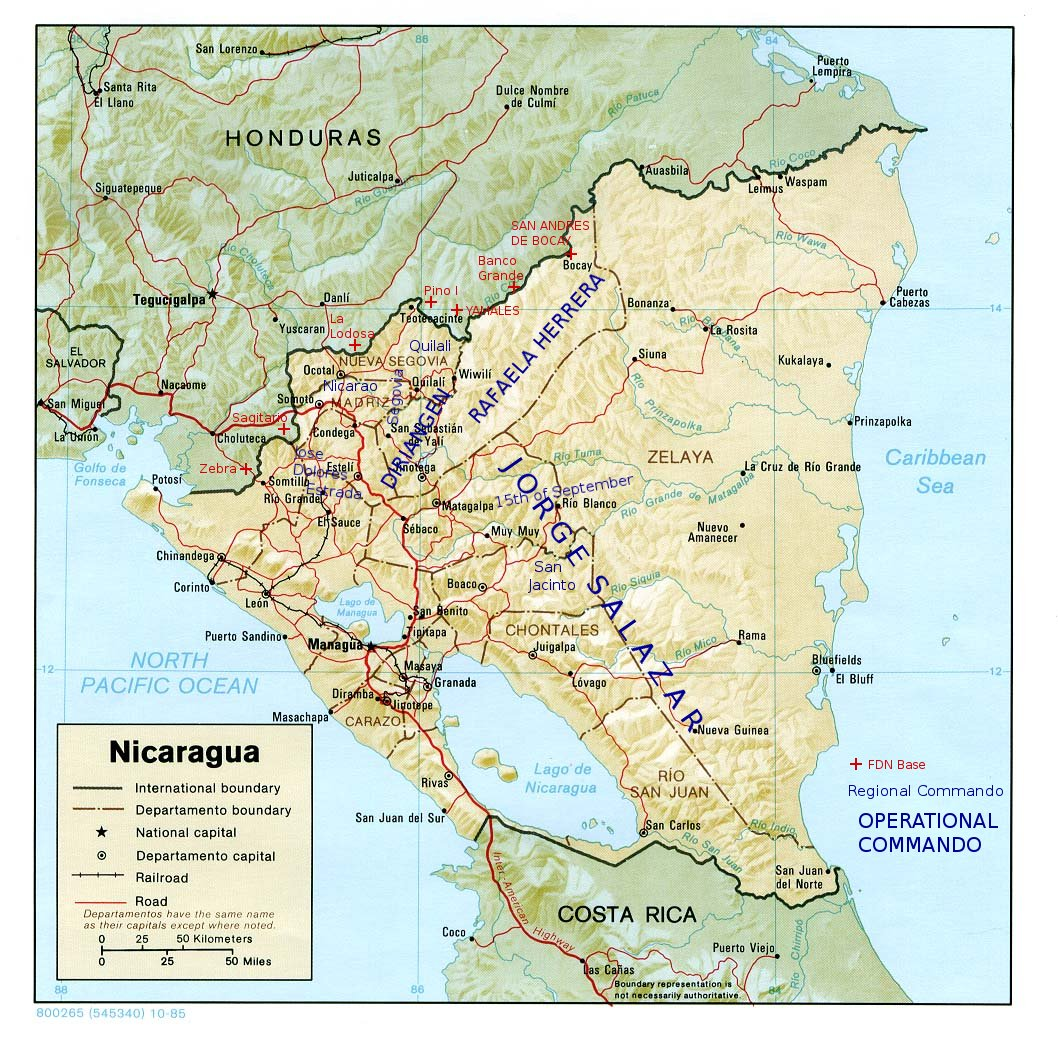
Regional commands of the FDN (1985)

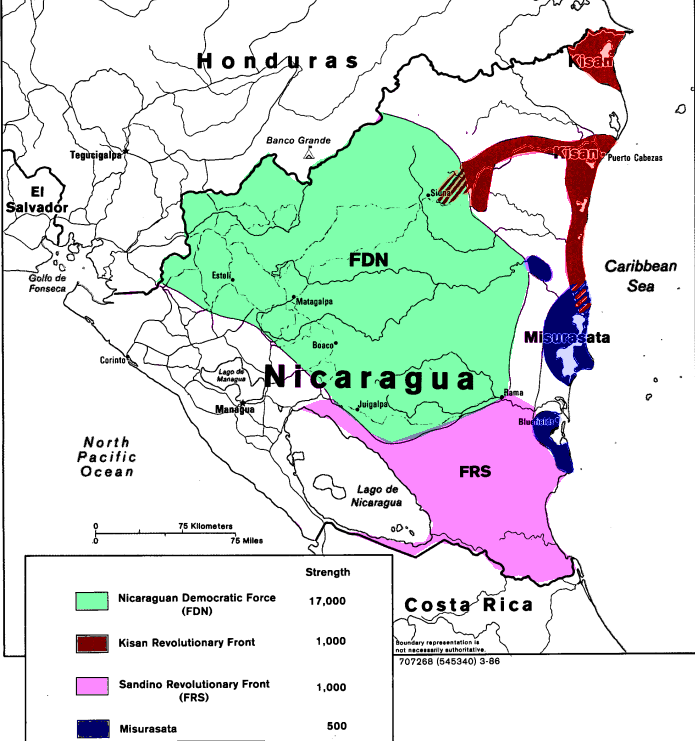
1986

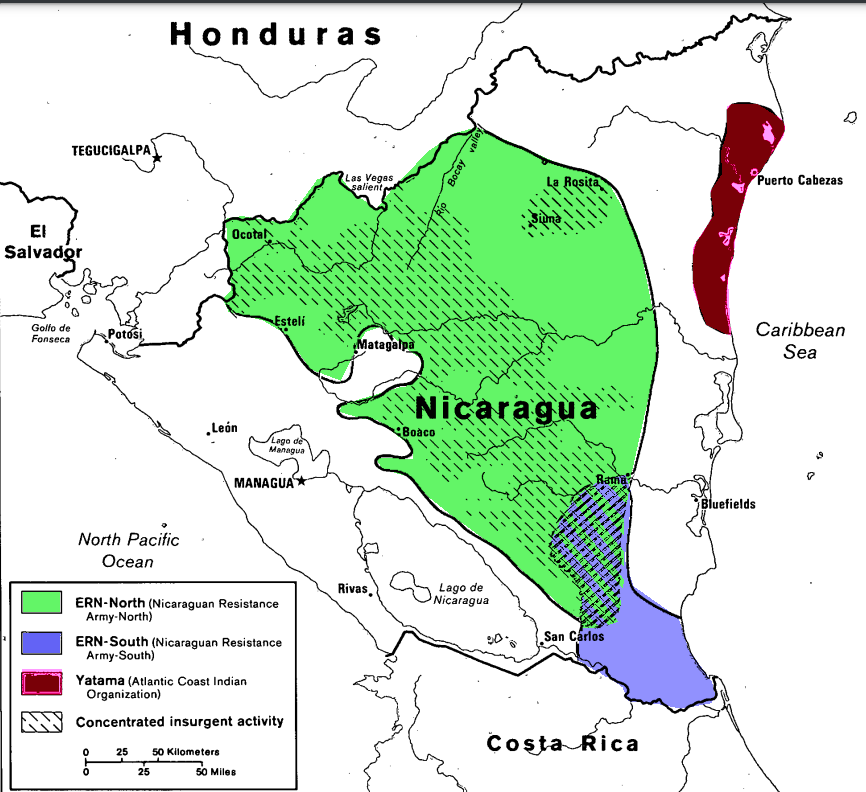
1988

== See also ==
- Dirty War
- CIA activities in Nicaragua
- Iran–Contra affair
- La Penca bombing
- Operation Golden Pheasant
- Murals of revolutionary Nicaragua
- Nicaragua v. United States
- Under Fire (film)
- United States embargo against Nicaragua
- Women in the Nicaraguan Revolution

== Bibliography ==
- Brown, Timothy (2001). The Real Contra War: Highlander Peasant Resistance in Nicaragua. University of Oklahoma Press. ISBN 9780806132525.
- Caballero Jurado, Carlos; Thomas, Nigel (1990). Central American Wars 1959–89. Men-at-Arms series, No. 221. London: Osprey Publishing. ISBN 978-0-85045-945-6.
- Dinges, John (1990). Our Man in Panama. Random House. ISBN 978-0-8129-1950-9.
- Emily L Andrews, Active Marianismo: Women's social and political action in Nicaraguan Christian base communities and the Sandinista revolution. The Marianismo Ideal Grinnell College research project, 1997. Retrieved November 2009.
- Enrique Bermudez (with Michael Johns), "The Contras' Valley Forge: How I View the Nicaragua Crisis", Policy Review magazine, Summer 1988.
- David Close, Salvador Marti Puig & Shelley McConnell (2010) "The Sandinistas and Nicaragua, 1979–2009" NY: Lynne Rienner.
- Dodson, Michael, and Laura Nuzzi O'Shaughnessy (1990). Nicaragua's Other Revolution: Religious Faith and Political Struggle. Chapel Hill: University of North Carolina Press. ISBN 0-8078-4266-4
- Hamilton, Lee H.; Inouye, Daniel K. (1995). Report of the Congressional Committees Investigating the Iran/Contra Affair. DIANE Publishing Company. ISBN 9780788126024.
- Head, Michael & Viglietti, Brian (2012). "Question 35/48: Nicaraguan 'Contra' Mining Campaign". Warship International. LXIX (4): 299–301. ISSN 0043-0374.
- Sullivan, PL; Karreth, J (2019). "Strategies and Tactics in Armed Conflict (STAC): Case Notes vol. 1" (PDF). Journal of Conflict Resolution.
- Schmidli, William Michael, "'The Most Sophisticated Intervention We Have Seen': The Carter Administration and the Nicaraguan Crisis, 1978–1979," Diplomacy and Statecraft, (2012) 23#1 pp 66–86.
- Sierakowski, Robert. Sandinistas: A Moral History. University of Notre Dame Press, 2019.

=== Primary sources ===
- Katherine Hoyt, Memories of the 1979 Final Offensive, Nicanet, Retrieved November 2009. This is a first-hand account from Matagalpa; also contains some information on the general situation. Has photographs showing considerable damage to Matagalpa. News and Information
- Salvador Martí Puig, "Nicaragua. La revolución enredada", Libros de la Catarata: Madrid.
- Oleg Ignatiev, "The Storm of Tiscapa", in Borovik and Ignatiev, The Agony of a Dictatorship. Progress Publishers, 1979; English translation, 1980.
