= Daniel Ortega =

Leader of Nicaragua (1981–1990; 2007–present)

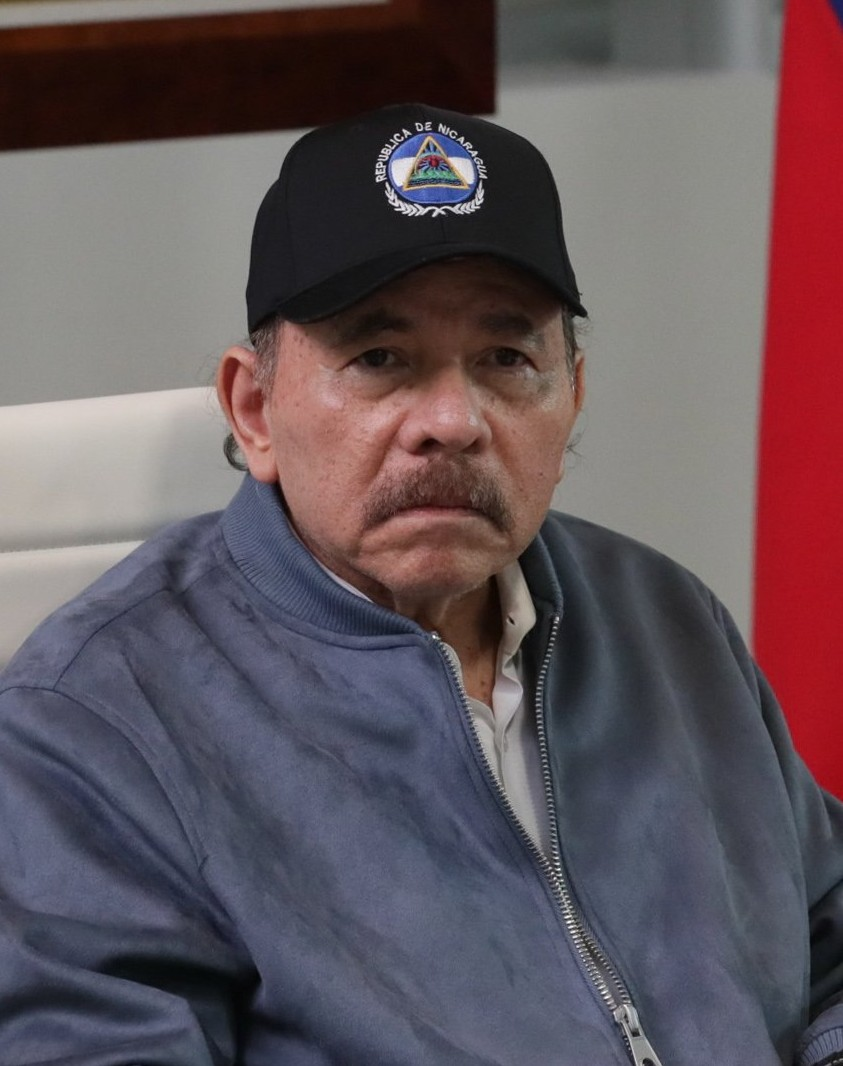
- Ortega in 2024

President of Nicaragua Co-President of Nicaragua (since 2025)
- Incumbent
- Assumed office 10 January 2007 Serving with Rosario Murillo
- Vice President: See list: Jaime Morales Carazo (2007–2012) Omar Halleslevens (2012–2017) Rosario Murillo (2017–2025)
- Preceded by: Enrique Bolaños
- In office 10 January 1985 – 25 April 1990
- Vice President: Sergio Ramírez
- Preceded by: Office suspended; Himself (as Coordinator of the Junta of National Reconstruction)
- Succeeded by: Violeta Chamorro

Coordinator of the Junta of National Reconstruction
- In office 4 March 1981 (Note: Member since 18 July 1979) – 10 January 1985
- Preceded by: Francisco Urcuyo (as Acting President of Nicaragua)
- Succeeded by: Himself (as President of Nicaragua)
Ceremonial titles
First Gentleman of Nicaragua
Current
Assumed role 18 February 2025 Serving with Rosario Murillo (Note: As First Lady)
President	Rosario Murillo
Preceded by	Rosario Murillo (Note: As sole First Lady)
Second Gentleman of Nicaragua
In role 10 January 2017 – 18 February 2025
Vice President	Rosario Murillo
Preceded by	Ligia Alemán (Note: As Second Lady)
Succeeded by	Role vacant

Personal details
- Born: José Daniel Ortega Saavedra; 11 November 1945 (age 81) La Libertad, Chontales, Nicaragua
- Party: FSLN (since 1958)
- Spouse: Rosario Murillo (m. 1979)
- Children: 8, including Juan
- Relatives: Humberto Ortega (brother); Camilo Ortega (brother); Xiomara Blandino (daughter-in-law)
- Awards: Al-Gaddafi International Prize for Human Rights

Military service
- Allegiance: Nicaragua
- Branch/service: FSLN; Nicaraguan Army
- Years of service: 1963–1967; 1975–1979; 1979–1990; 2007–present
- Rank: Commander-in-chief (1978–present)
- Battles/wars: Nicaraguan Revolution

José Daniel Ortega Saavedra (/ɔːrˈteɪɡə/ or-TAY-gə; Spanish: [daˈnjel oɾˈteɣa]; born 11 November 1945) is a Nicaraguan politician, revolutionary, and former guerrilla fighter who, under various titles, has been the leader of Nicaragua since 2007 and previously from 1981 to 1990. He first came to power as the coordinator of the Junta of National Reconstruction from 1979 to 1985, and then served as president of Nicaragua from 1985 until 1990. He reassumed the presidency in 2007 and has served alongside his wife Rosario Murillo as co-president since February 2025. Ortega has been described as an authoritarian leader and has invited comparisons to Anastasio Somoza Debayle. He is widely considered to be a dictator along with his wife.

Ortega came to prominence with the overthrow and exile of US-backed dictator Anastasio Somoza Debayle in 1979 during the Nicaraguan Revolution. As a leader in the Sandinista National Liberation Front (Spanish: Frente Sandinista de Liberación Nacional, FSLN) Ortega became leader of the ruling Junta of National Reconstruction. A Marxist–Leninist, Ortega pursued a program of nationalization, land reform, wealth redistribution, and literacy programs during his first period in office. Ortega's government was responsible for the forced displacement of 10,000 indigenous people. In 1984, Ortega won Nicaragua's presidential election with over 60% of the vote as the FSLN's candidate. During his first term, he implemented policies to achieve leftist reforms across Nicaragua. Throughout the 1980s, Ortega's government faced a rebellion by US-backed rebels, known as the Contras. After a presidency marred by conflict and economic collapse, Ortega was defeated in the 1990 general election by Violeta Chamorro.

Ortega was an unsuccessful presidential candidate in 1996 and 2001 but won the 2006 general election. In office, he allied with fellow Latin American socialists. His second administration abandoned most of his earlier leftist principles, alienating many of his former revolutionary allies. Under his tenure, Nicaragua has experienced democratic backsliding. In June 2018, organizations such as Amnesty International and the Organization of American States reported that Ortega had engaged in a violent oppression campaign against anti-government protests. The violent crackdown and subsequent constriction of civil liberties have led to waves of emigration to neighboring Costa Rica, with more than 30,000 Nicaraguans filing for asylum in that country.

His government jailed many potential rival candidates in the 2021 general election, including Cristiana Chamorro Barrios. Ortega's government also imprisoned other opponents, such as former allies Dora María Téllez and Hugo Torres Jiménez. In August 2021, Nicaragua cancelled the operating permits of six US and European NGOs. Many critics of the Ortega government, including opposition leaders, journalists and members of civil society, fled the country in mid-2021. In his fourth term, Ortega ordered the closure of several NGOs, universities, and newspapers, and resumed his repression of the Catholic Church after a brief rapprochement, imprisoning prelate Rolando José Álvarez Lagos.

== Early life ==
=== Early childhood ===
Ortega was born in La Libertad in Chontales Department, into a working-class family. His parents, Daniel Simeón Ortega Cerda and Lidia Albertina Saavedra Rivas, were opposed to the regime of Anastasio Somoza Debayle. Ortega's mother was imprisoned by Somoza's National Guard for being in possession of "love letters", which police said were coded political missives. Ortega and his two brothers grew up to become revolutionaries. His late brother Humberto Ortega was a former general, military leader, and published writer, and the third brother Camilo Ortega died fighting the Somoza regime in 1978. They had a sister, Germania, who died.

=== Juigalpa and Managua ===
Seeking stable employment, the family migrated from La Libertad to the provincial capital of Juigalpa, and then to a middle-class neighborhood in Managua. In Managua, Ortega and his brother studied at the upper-middle-class high school, the LaSalle Institute, where Ortega was classmates with Arnoldo Aleman, who would go on to be mayor of Managua (1990–1995) and later President of Nicaragua (1997–2002). Ortega's father Daniel Ortega Cedra detested US military intervention in Nicaragua and Washington's support for the Somoza government. He imparted this anti-American sentiment to his sons.

=== Early political activity ===
Ortega was first arrested for political activities at the age of 15 and quickly joined the then-underground Sandinista National Liberation Front (FSLN) in 1963. In 1964, Ortega travelled to Guatemala, where the police arrested him and turned him over to the Nicaraguan National Guard. After his release from detention, Ortega arranged the assassination of his torturer, Guardsman Gonzalo Lacayo, in August 1967.

=== Imprisonment ===
He was imprisoned in 1967 for an armed robbery of a branch of the Bank of America. Ortega was released in late 1974, along with other Sandinista prisoners, in exchange for Somocista hostages. While imprisoned at the Modelo jail, just outside Managua, Ortega wrote poems, including "En la prisión" ("In the Prison"), which was published in the literary journal Casa de las Américas in 1971. The poem's closing lines refer to the prisoners not having known Managua "in a miniskirt". This phrase has sometimes been reported as the title of a separate poem, but biographer Kenneth E. Morris suggests that no such separate poem may exist and that the reports may instead refer to the ending of "In the Prison". During his imprisonment, Ortega was tortured. While he was incarcerated at El Modelo, his mother helped stage protests and hunger strikes for political prisoners; this resulted in improving the treatment of incarcerated Sandinistas.

=== Exile in Cuba ===
Upon release in 1974, Ortega was exiled to Cuba. There he received training in guerrilla warfare from Fidel Castro's Marxist–Leninist government. He later secretly returned to Nicaragua.

=== Sectional division within the FSLN ===
In the late 1970s, divisions over the FSLN's campaign against Somoza led Ortega and his brother Humberto to form the Insurrectionist, or Tercerista (Third Way) faction. The Terceristas sought to combine the distinct guerrilla war strategies of the two other factions, Tomás Borge's Guerra Prolongada Popular (GPP, or Prolonged People's War), and Jaime Wheelock's Proletarian Tendency. The Ortega brothers forged alliances with a wide array of anti-Somoza forces, including Catholic and Protestant activists, and other non-Marxist civil society groups. The Terceristas became the most effective faction in wielding political and military strength, and their push for FSLN solidarity received the support of revolutionary leaders such as Fidel Castro.

== Sandinista revolution and first presidency (1979–1990) ==
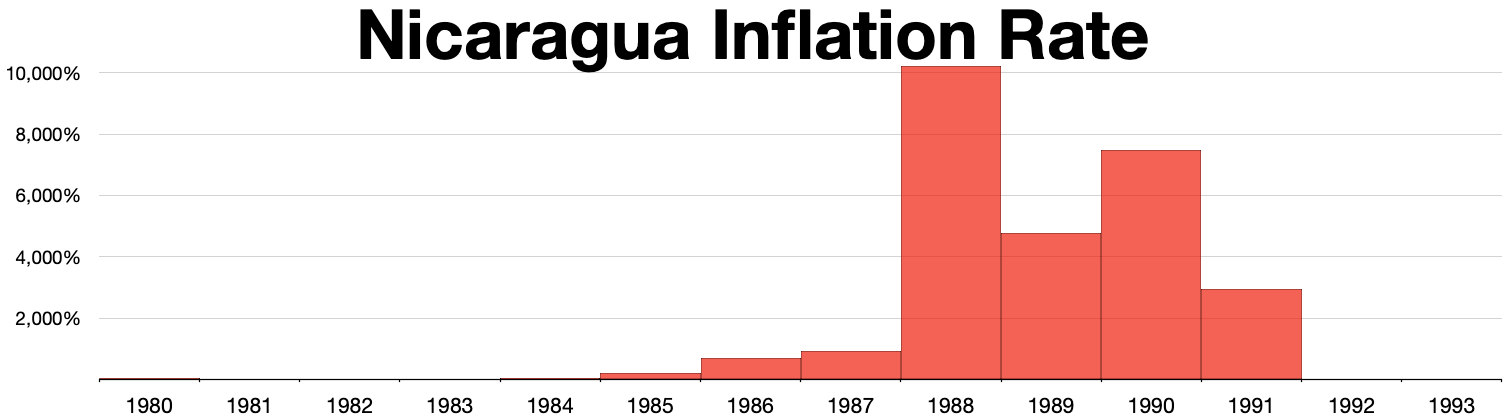
Nicaraguan inflation rate 1980–1993

When Somoza was overthrown by the FSLN in July 1979, Ortega became a member of the five-person Junta of National Reconstruction, which included Sandinista militant Moisés Hassan, novelist Sergio Ramírez, businessman Alfonso Robelo, and Violeta Barrios de Chamorro, the widow of a murdered journalist. In September 1979, United States President Carter hosted Ortega at the White House, and warned him against arming other Central American leftist guerrilla movements. Ortega said the Sandinistas were not involved in neighboring countries. When Ortega questioned the Americans about CIA support for anti-Sandinista groups, Carter and Deputy Secretary of State Warren Christopher said the reports were false. After the meeting, Carter asked Congress for $75 million in aid to Nicaragua, contingent on the Sandinista government's promise not to aid other guerrillas.

The FSLN came to dominate the junta, Robelo and Chamorro resigned, and in 1981 Ortega became the coordinator of the Junta. As the only member of the FSLN National Directorate in the Junta, he was the effective leader of the country. After attaining power, the FSLN embarked upon an ambitious programme of social reform. They arranged to redistribute 20,000 square kilometres (5 million acres) of land to about 100,000 families. They also launched a literacy drive, made health care improvements that ended polio through mass vaccinations, and reduced the frequency of other treatable diseases. The Sandinista nationalization efforts affected mostly banks and industries owned by the extended Somoza family. More than half of all farms, businesses, and industries remained in private hands. The revolutionary government wanted to preserve a mixed economy and support private sector investment. The Superior Council of Private Enterprise (COSEP) opposed the Sandinistas' economic reform. The main organization of Nicaraguan big business was composed of prosperous families from the Pacific coast cities, who dominated commerce and banking.

Indigenous people formed two rebel groups – the Misura and Misurasata, comprising between 500 and 2,000 fighters. They were joined in the north by Nicaraguan Democratic Force (FDN) and in the south by former Sandinistas and peasantry who, under the leadership of Edén Pastora, were resisting forced collectivization. Ortega's administration took a hard line against opposition to his policies: On 21 February 1981, the Sandinista army killed 7 Miskito Indians and wounded 17 and 10,000 individuals had been moved by 1982. Thousands of Indians fled to take refuge across the border in Honduras, and Ortega's government imprisoned 300 in Nicaragua. Anthropologist Gilles Bataillon termed this "politics of ethnocide" in Nicaragua.

In 1980 the Sandinista government launched the Nicaraguan Literacy Campaign and said the illiteracy rate fell from 50% to 13% in the span of five months. Robert F. Arnove said the figures were excessive because many "unteachable" illiterates were omitted from the statistics, and many people declared literate were found to be unable to read or write a simple sentence. Richard Kraft said that even if the figures were exaggerated, the "accomplishment is without precedent in educational history". In 1980, UNESCO awarded Nicaragua the Nadezhda K. Krupskaya prize in recognition of its efforts. The FSLN also focused on improving the Nicaraguan health system, particularly through vaccination campaigns and the construction of public hospitals. These actions reduced child mortality by half, to 40 deaths per thousand. By 1982, the World Health Organization deemed Nicaragua a model for primary health care. During this period, Nicaragua won the UNESCO prize for exceptional health progress.

In 1981, United States President Ronald Reagan accused the FSLN of joining with Soviet-backed Cuba in supporting Marxist revolutionary movements in other Latin American countries, such as El Salvador. People within the Reagan administration authorized the CIA to begin financing, arming and training rebels as anti-Sandinista guerrillas, some of whom were former officers from Somoza's National Guard. These were known collectively as the Contras. This resulted in one of the largest political scandals in US history known as the Iran–Contra affair. Oliver North and several members of the Reagan administration defied the Boland Amendment, selling arms to Iran and using the proceeds in order to secretly fund the Contras.

The Contra war claimed 30,000 lives in Nicaragua. The tactics used by the Sandinista government to fight the Contras have been widely condemned for their suppression of civil rights. On 15 March 1982, the junta declared a state of siege, which allowed it to close independent radio stations, suspend the right of association, and limit the freedom of trade unions. Nicaragua's Permanent Commission on Human Rights condemned Sandinista human rights violations, accusing them of killing and forcibly disappearing thousands of persons in the first few years of the war.

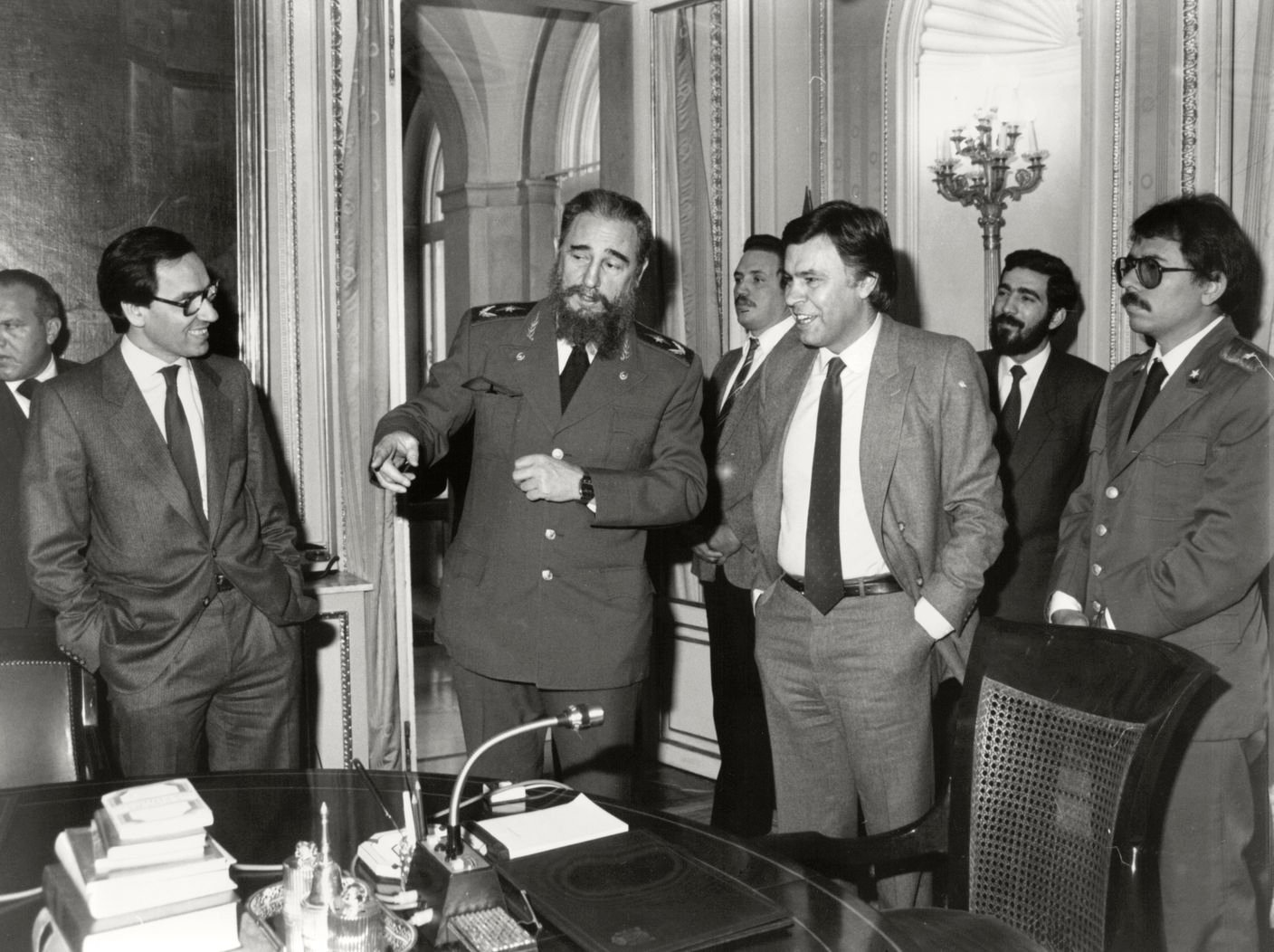
Ortega (far right) with Spanish Prime Minister Felipe González, Cuban President Fidel Castro and Spanish Deputy Prime Minister Alfonso Guerra in Madrid, 1984

At the 1984 general election, Ortega won the presidency with 67% of the vote and took office on 10 January 1985. In the early phases of the campaign, Ortega enjoyed many institutional advantages, and used the full power of the press, police, and Supreme Electoral Council against the fractured opposition. In the weeks before the November election, Ortega gave a U.N. speech denouncing talks held in Rio de Janeiro on electoral reform. But by 22 October, the Sandinistas signed an accord with opposition parties to reform electoral and campaign laws, making the process more fair and transparent. While campaigning, Ortega promoted the Sandinistas' achievements, and at a rally said that "Democracy is literacy, democracy is land reform, democracy is education and public health." International observers judged the election to be the first free election held in the country in more than half a century. A report by an Irish governmentary delegation stated: "The electoral process was carried out with total integrity. The seven parties participating in the elections represented a broad spectrum of political ideologies." The general counsel of New York's Human Rights Commission described the election as "free, fair and hotly contested". A study by the US Latin American Studies Association (LASA) concluded that the FSLN (Sandinista Front) "did little more to take advantage of its incumbency than incumbent parties everywhere (including the U.S.) routinely do". However, the Reagan administration described the elections as "a Soviet-style sham", and contemporary North-American press coverage tended to cast doubt on the election's legitimacy.

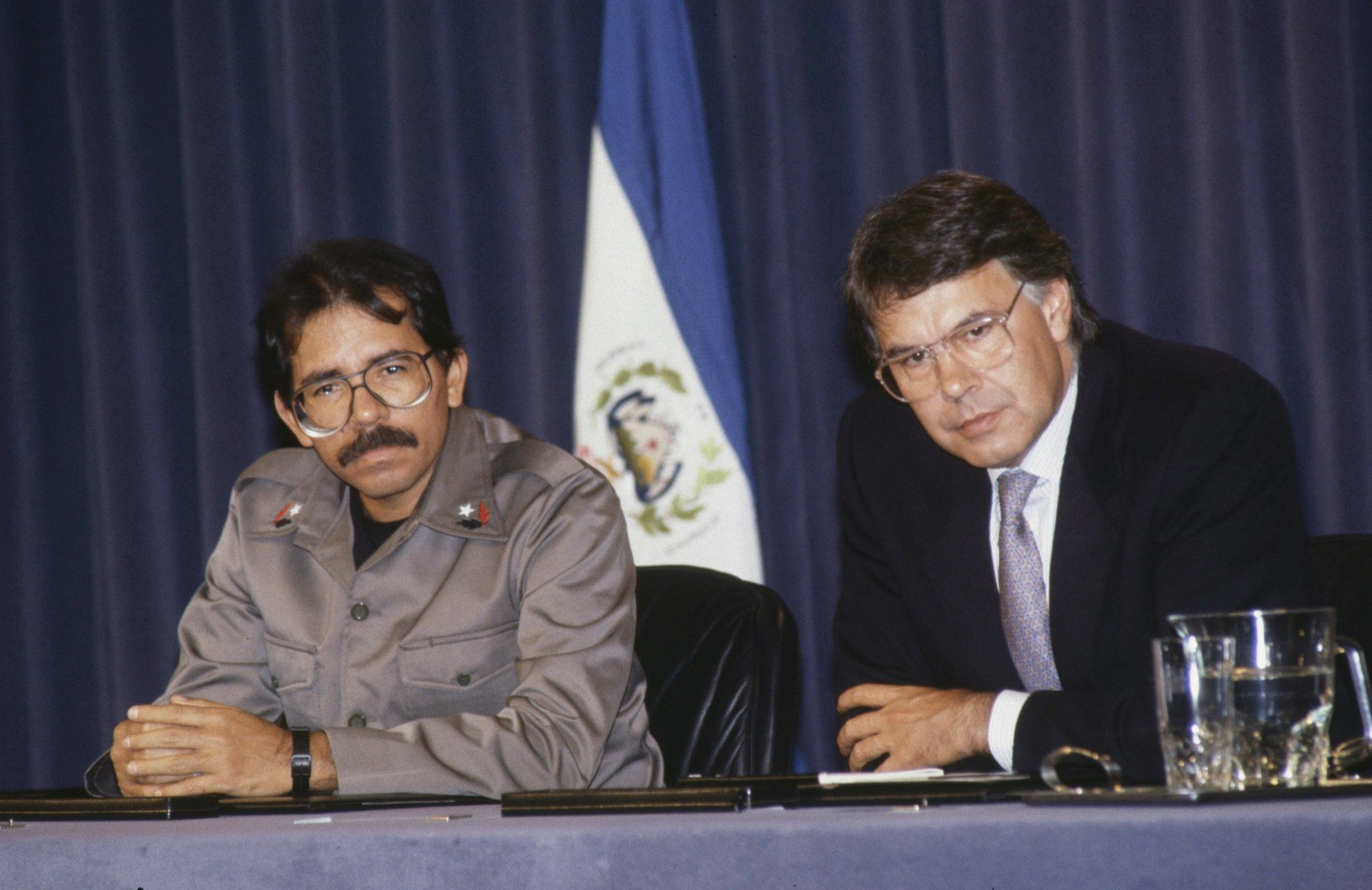
Ortega and Spanish Prime Minister Felipe González in 1989

Thirty-three per cent of the Nicaraguan voters cast ballots for one of six opposition parties — three to the right of the Sandinistas, three to the left-which had campaigned with the aid of government funds and free TV and radio time. Two conservative parties captured a combined 23% of the vote. They held rallies across the country (a few of which were disrupted by FSLN supporters) and blasted the Sandinistas in harsh terms. Most foreign and independent observers noted this pluralism in debunking the Reagan administration charge — ubiquitous in the US media — that it was a "Soviet-style sham" election. Some opposition parties boycotted the election, allegedly under pressure from US embassy officials, and so it was denounced as being unfair by the Reagan administration. Reagan thus maintained that he was justified to continue supporting what he referred to as the Contras' "democratic resistance".

The illegal intervention on behalf the Contras continued (covertly) after Ortega's election. Peace talks between five Central American heads of state in July 1987 led to the signing of the Central American Peace Accords, and the beginning of a roadmap to the end of the conflict. In 1988, the Contras first entered into peace talks with the Sandinista government, although the violence continued, as did US support. Despite US opposition, disarmament of the Contras began in 1989.

== In opposition (1990–2007) ==
Ortega delivering a speech on February 26, 1990, at the Omar Torrijos Non-Aligned Movement Plaza in Managua, following the previous day's electoral defeat

Daniel Ortega delivering a speech on February 26, 1990, at the Omar Torrijos Non-Aligned Movement Plaza in Managua, following the previous day's electoral defeat.

In the 1990 presidential election, Ortega lost his reelection bid to Violeta Barrios de Chamorro, his former colleague in the junta. Chamorro was supported by the US and a 14-party anti-Sandinista alliance known as the National Opposition Union (Unión Nacional Oppositora, UNO), an alliance that ranged from conservatives and liberals to communists. She ran an effective campaign, presenting herself as the peace candidate and promising to end the US-funded Contra War if she won. Ortega campaigned on the slogan, "Everything Will Be Better", and promised that, with the Contra war over, he could focus on the nation's recovery. Contrary to what most observers expected, Chamorro shocked Ortega and won the election. Chamorro's UNO coalition garnered 54% of the vote, and won 51 of the 92 seats in the National Assembly. Immediately after the loss, the Sandinistas tried to maintain unity around their revolutionary posture. In Ortega's concession speech the following day he vowed to keep "ruling from below" a reference to the power that the FSLN still wielded in various sectors. He also stressed his belief that the Sandinistas had the goal of bringing "dignity" to Latin America, and not necessarily to hold on to government posts. In 1991, Ortega said elections were "an instrument to reaffirm" the FSLN's "political and ideological positions", and also "confront capitalism". However, the electoral loss led to pronounced divisions in the FSLN. Some members adopted more pragmatic positions, and sought to transform the FSLN into a modern social democratic party engaged in national reconciliation and class cooperation. Ortega and other party insiders found common ground with the radicals, who still promoted anti-imperialism and class conflict to achieve social change.

Possible explanations for his loss include that the Nicaraguan people were disenchanted with the Ortega government as well as the fact that already in November 1989, the White House had announced that the economic embargo against Nicaragua would continue unless Violeta Chamorro won. Also, there had been reports of intimidation from the side of the contras, with a Canadian observer mission stating that 42 people were killed by the contras in "election violence" in October 1989. This led many commentators to assume that Nicaraguans voted against the Sandinistas out of fear of a continuation of the contra war and economic deprivation.

From 19 to 21 July 1991, the FSLN held a National Congress to mend the rifts between members and form a new overarching political program. The effort failed to unite the party, and intense debates over the internal governance of the FSLN continued. The pragmatists, led by the former vice president Sergio Ramirez, formed the basis of a "renovating" faction, and supported collaboration with other political forces to preserve the rule of law in Nicaragua. Under the leadership of Ortega and Tomás Borge, the radicals regrouped into the "principled" faction, and branded themselves the Izquierda Democratica (ID), or Democratic Left (DL). The DL fought the Chamorro government with disruptive labor strikes and demonstrations, and renewed calls for the revolutionary reconstruction of Nicaraguan society. During the 20–23 May 1994, extraordinary congress, Ortega ran against a fellow National Directorate member, Henry Ruiz, for the position of party secretary-general. Ortega was elected with 287 to Ruiz's 147 votes, and the DL secured the most dominant role in the FSLN.

On 9 September 1994, Ortega gained more power after taking over Sergio Ramirez's seat in the Asamblea Sandinista (Sandinista Assembly). Ramirez had been chief of the FSLN's parliamentary caucus since 1990, but Ortega came to oppose his actions in the National Assembly, setting the stage for Ramirez's removal. Key figures, such as Ernesto Cardenal, a former minister of culture in the Sandinista government, rejected Ortega's consolidation of power: "My resignation from the FSLN has been caused by the kidnapping of the party carried out by Daniel Ortega and the group he heads." The party formally split on 8 January 1995, when Ramirez and a number of prominent Sandinista officials quit.

Ortega ran for election again, in October 1996 and November 2001, but lost on both occasions to Arnoldo Alemán and Enrique Bolaños, respectively. In these elections, a key issue was the allegation of corruption. In Ortega's last days as president, through a series of legislative acts known as "The Piñata", estates that had been seized by the Sandinista government (some valued at millions and even billions of US dollars) became the private property of various FSLN officials, including Ortega himself.

In the 1996 campaign, Ortega faced the Liberal Alliance (Alianza Liberal), headed by Arnoldo Aleman Lacayo, a former mayor of Managua. The Sandinistas softened their anti-imperialist rhetoric, with Ortega calling the US "our great neighbor", and vowing to cooperate "within a framework of respect, equality, and justice". The image change failed, as Aleman's Liberal Alliance came first with 51.03% of the vote, while Ortega's FSLN secured 37.75%.

Ortega's policies became more moderate during his time in opposition, and he gradually changed much of his former Marxist–Leninist stance in favor of an agenda of democratic socialism. His Roman Catholic faith has become more public in recent years as well, leading Ortega to embrace a variety of socially conservative policies; in 2006 the FSLN endorsed a strict law banning all abortions in Nicaragua. In the run-up to the 2006 elections, Ortega displayed his ties to the Catholic Church by renewing his marriage vows before Cardinal Miguel Obando y Bravo.

Ortega was instrumental in creating the controversial strategic pact between the FSLN and the Constitutional Liberal Party (Partido Liberal Constitucionalista, PLC). The controversial alliance of Nicaragua's two major parties is aimed at distributing power between the PLC and FSLN, and preventing other parties from rising. After sealing the agreement in January 2000, the two parties controlled the three key institutions of the state: the Comptroller General of the Republic, the Supreme Court, and the Supreme Electoral Council. "El Pacto", as it is known in Nicaragua, is said to have personally benefited former presidents Ortega and Alemán greatly, while constraining then-president Bolaños. One of the key accords of the pact was to lower the ratio necessary to win a presidential election in the first round from 45% to 35%, a change in electoral law that would become decisive in Ortega's favor in the 2006 elections.

At the Fourth Ordinary Congress of the FSLN, held 17–18 March 2002, Ortega eliminated the National Directorate (DN). Once the main collective leadership body of the party, with nine members, the DN no longer met routinely, and only three historic members remained. Instead, the body just supported decisions already made by the secretary-general. Ortega sidelined party officials and other members while empowering his own informal circle, known as the ring of iron.

=== 2001 presidential election ===
In the November 2001 general elections, Ortega lost his third successive presidential election, this time to Enrique Bolaños of the Constitutionalist Liberal Party.

Under Ortega's direction, the FSLN formed the broad National Convergence (Convergencia Nacional) coalition in opposition to the PLC. Ortega abandoned the revolutionary tone of the past, and infused his campaign with religious imagery, giving thanks in speeches to "God and the Revolution" for the post-1990 democracy, and said a Sandinista victory would enable the Nicaraguan people to "pass through the sea and reach the Promised Land". The US opposed Ortega's candidacy from the beginning. The US ambassador even appeared with the PLC's Enrique Bolaños while distributing food aid. The 11 September 2001, terrorist attacks doomed Ortega's chances, as the threat of a US invasion became an issue. Bolanos convinced many Nicaraguans that the renewed US hostility towards terrorism would endanger their country if the openly anti-US Ortega prevailed. Bolanos ended up with 56.3% of the vote, and Ortega won 42.3%.

=== 2006 presidential election ===
In 2006, Daniel Ortega was elected president with 38% of the vote. This occurred despite the fact that the breakaway Sandinista Renovation Movement (MRS) continued to oppose the FSLN, running former Mayor of Managua, Herty Lewites as its candidate for president. Ortega personally attacked Lewites' Jewish background, compared him to Judas, and warned he "could end up hanged." However, Lewites died several months before the elections.

Ortega emphasized peace and reconciliation in his campaign, and selected a former Contra leader, Jaime Morales Carazo, as his running mate. The FSLN also won 38 seats in the congressional elections, becoming the party with the largest representation in parliament. The split in the Constitutionalist Liberal Party helped allow the FSLN to become the largest party in Congress; however, the Sandinista vote had a minuscule split between the FSLN and MRS, and that the liberal party combined is larger than the Frente Faction. In 2010, several liberal congressmen accused the FSLN of attempting to buy votes to pass constitutional reforms that would allow Ortega to run for office for the 6th time since 1984.

== Second presidency (2007–present) ==
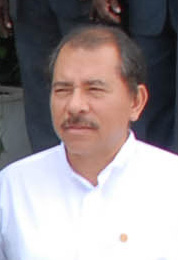
Ortega in 2007

Presidential styles of Daniel Ortega
- Reference style: Daniel Ortega, Presidente de la República de Nicaragua; Daniel Ortega, President of the Republic of Nicaragua
- Spoken style: Presidente Ortega; President Ortega
- Alternative style: Señor Presidente; Mister President

According to Tim Rogers, writing in The Atlantic, during his second term as president, Ortega took "full control of all four branches of government, state institutions, the military, and police", and in the process dismantled "Nicaragua's institutional democracy". Frances Robles wrote that Ortega took control of "every aspect of government ... the National Assembly, the Supreme Court, the armed forces, the judiciary, the police and the prosecutor's office". In its 2019 World Report, Human Rights Watch wrote that Ortega "aggressively dismantled all institutional checks on presidential power". Many journalists and governments criticize Ortega and label him a dictator.

=== 2008 elections ===
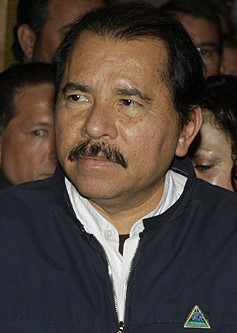
Ortega in 2008

In June 2008, the Nicaraguan Supreme Court disqualified the MRS and the Conservative Party from participation in municipal elections. In November 2008, the Supreme Electoral Council received national and international criticism following irregularities in municipal elections, but agreed to review results for Managua only, while the opposition demanded a nationwide review. For the first time since 1990, the Council decided not to allow national or international observers to witness the election. Instances of intimidation, violence, and harassment of opposition political party members and NGO representatives have been recorded. Official results show Sandinista candidates winning 94 of the 146 municipal mayoralties, compared to 46 for the main opposition Liberal Constitutional Party (PLC). The opposition claimed that marked ballots were dumped and destroyed, that party members were refused access to some of the vote counts and that tallies from many polling places were altered. As a result of the fraud allegations, the European Union and the United States suspended 70 million dollars and 64 million dollars of aid respectively.

With the late-2000s recession, Ortega in 2011 characterised capitalism as in its "death throes" and portrayed the Bolivarian Alternative for the People of Our America (ALBA) as the most advanced, most Christian and fairest project. He also said God was punishing the United States with the financial crisis for trying to impose its economic principles on poor countries. "It's incredible that in the most powerful country in the world, which spends billions of dollars on brutal wars ... people do not have enough money to stay in their homes."

Before the National Sandinista Council held in September 2009, Lenin Cerna, the secretary of the party organization, called for diversifying its political strategies. He declared the FSLN's future depended on implementing new plans, "so that the party can advance via new routes and in new ways, always under Ortega's leadership". Ortega gained power over the selection of candidates, allowing him to personally choose all candidates for public office.

During an interview with David Frost for the Al Jazeera English programme Frost Over the World in March 2009, Ortega suggested that he would like to change the constitution to allow him to run again for president. In Judicial Decision 504, issued on 19 October 2009, the Supreme Court of Justice of Nicaragua declared portions of Articles 147 and 178 of the Constitution of Nicaragua inapplicable; these provisions concerned the eligibility of candidates for president, vice-president, mayor, and vice-mayor—a decision that had the effect of allowing Ortega to run for reelection in 2011.

For this decision, the Sandinista magistrates formed the required quorum by excluding the opposition magistrates and replacing them with Sandinista substitutes, violating the Nicaraguan constitution. Opposing parties, the church and human rights groups in Nicaragua denounced the decision. Throughout 2010, court rulings gave Ortega greater power over judicial and civil service appointments.

While supporting abortion rights during his presidency during the 1980s, Ortega has since embraced the Catholic Church's position of strong opposition. While non-emergency abortions have long been illegal in Nicaragua, recently even abortions "in the case where the pregnancy endangers the mother's life", otherwise known as therapeutic abortions, with the support of Ortega, have been made illegal in the days before the 2006 election, with a six-year prison term in such cases.

=== 2011 election ===
Ortega at his third inauguration, January 10, 2012

Ortega was re-elected president with a vote on 6 November and confirmation on 16 November 2011. During the election, the Supreme Electoral Council (CSE) blocked both domestic and international poll observers from multiple polling stations. According to the Supreme Electoral Council, Ortega defeated Fabio Gadea, with 63% of the vote.

2014 amendments

In January 2014, the National Assembly, dominated by the FSLN, approved constitutional amendments that abolished term limits for the presidency and allowed a president to run for an unlimited number of five-year terms. While the FSLN claimed the amendments would assure the stability Nicaragua needed to deal with long-term problems, the opposition claimed they were a threat to democracy. The constitutional reforms also gave Ortega the sole power to appoint military and police commanders.

=== 2016 elections ===
As of 2016, Ortega's family owns three of the nine free-to-air television channels in Nicaragua, and controls a fourth (the public Channel 6). Four of the remaining five are controlled by Mexican mogul Ángel González, and are generally considered to be aligned with Ortega's ruling FSLN party. There are no government restrictions on Internet use; the Ortega administration attempted to gain complete control over online media in 2015, but failed due to opposition from civil society, political parties, and private organizations. In June 2016, the Nicaraguan supreme court ruled to oust Eduardo Montealegre, the leader of the main opposition party, leaving the main opposition coalition with no means of contesting the November 2016 national elections. In August 2016, Ortega chose his wife, Rosario Murillo, as his vice-presidential running-mate for re-election. According to The Washington Post, figures announced on 7 November 2016, put Daniel Ortega in line for his third consecutive term as president, also being his fourth term overall. The Supreme Electoral Council (CSE) reported Ortega and Murillo won 72.4% of the vote, with 68% turnout. The opposition coalition had called the election a "farce" and had called for the boycott of the election. International observers were not allowed to observe the vote. Nevertheless, according to the BBC, Ortega was the most popular candidate by far, possibly due to Nicaragua's stable economic growth and lack of violence compared to its neighbours El Salvador and Honduras in recent years.

Economic situation during presidency

According to Tim Rogers, until the 2018 unrest, as president Ortega presided over "the fastest-growing economy in Central America" and was a "poster child for foreign investment and citizen security in a region known for gangs and unrest". During this time the Ortega government formed an alliance with the Superior Council for Private Enterprise (COSEP), Nicaragua's council of business chambers. However the same unpopular decree which had the effect of "unilaterally overhauling the social-security tax system" (mentioned below) and precipitated the unrest in April 2018, also broke Ortega's arrangement with COSEP, and along with US sanctions, brought a sharp economic drop that as of mid-2020 is still "crippling" Nicaragua's economy.

=== Response to the COVID-19 pandemic ===
Ortega's government has been the target of criticism for its lack of a response to the pandemic.

On 14 March 2020, Ortega's government called a massive demonstration called "Love in the Time of COVID-19" as a show of support to him and his government. This occurred in the middle of the COVID-19 pandemic which had only recently been officially declared by the WHO.

According to CNN, as of mid-June 2020, Ortega had "refused to impose strict, preventive quarantine measures seen in neighboring countries" to fight the COVID-19 pandemic. "Public schools remain open, businesses continue to operate, festivals and cultural events are happening on an almost-weekly basis." The story stated that from mid-March to mid-June six politicians had died, and, according to witnesses, their remains disposed of at night in "express burials" (with police in attendance but "no Mass, no wake and no funeral arrangements", no photographs). The Ortega government said reports of "express burials" were "false news". According to AP News "the government threatened to ban" professional baseball players "who refuse to play baseball ... And everyone is warned to keep quiet." In hospitals "ruling-party activists ensure no information leaks out", and it quotes a doctor (anesthesiologist María Nela Escoto) complaining that in the public hospital where she works "everything is secret. They don't allow suggestions, and you can't question anything because they're watching. It's a very hostile environment." (At the start of the pandemic, Ortega was out of the public eye for "more than 40 days", and no explanation was given for his absence when he returned.)

=== 2018–2022 Nicaraguan protests ===
In April 2018, student protests over a nature reserve fire expanded to cover an unpopular decree that would have cut social security benefits and increased taxpayer contributions. The protesters were violently set upon by the state sponsored Sandinista Youth. Despite attempts by Ortega's government to hide the incident through censorship of all private-owned news outlets, photos and videos of the violence made their way to social media where they sparked outrage and urged more Nicaraguans to join in on the protests. Tensions escalated quickly, as police began using tear gas canisters and rubber bullets, and eventually live ammunition on unarmed protesters. Authorities were also seen arming Sandinista Youth members with weapons to serve as paramilitary forces. Dozens of student protesters were subsequently killed. Despite the withdrawal of the unpopular decree, the protests continue, with most protesters demanding Ortega's and his cabinet's resignations.

On 30 May 2018, Nicaragua's Mother's Day, over 300,000 people marched to honor the mothers of students killed in the preceding protests. Despite the attendance of children, mothers and retirees, and lack of any violence by marchers, marchers were attacked in an event dubbed the "Mother's Day Massacre". 16 were killed, and 88 injured, as "police sprayed the crowd with bullets, government sharpshooters positioned on the roof of the national baseball stadium went headhunting with sniper rifles".

In June 2018, Tim Rogers wrote in The Atlantic magazine:

Over the past seven weeks, Ortega's police and paramilitaries have killed more than 120 people, mostly students and other young protesters who are demanding the president's ouster and a return to democracy, according to a human-rights group [CENIDH, Nicaraguan Center for Human Rights]. Police hunt students like enemy combatants. Sandinista Youth paramilitaries, armed and paid by Ortega's party, drive around in pickup trucks attacking protesters. Gangs of masked men loot and burn shops with impunity. Cops wear civilian clothing, and some paramilitaries dress in police uniforms. "This is starting to look more like Syria than Caracas," one Nicaraguan business leader told me.

By 3 December 22 people were dead and 565 imprisoned. Professionals involved in the protests (lawyers, engineering majors, radio broadcasters and merchants) had been reduced to lives of "ever-changing safe houses, encrypted messaging apps and pseudonyms", with the Ortega government allegedly "hunting us like deer", according to one dissident (Roberto Carlos Membreño Briceño). Human rights organization offices were raided, computers seized and observers expelled. Observers from the Organization of American States were expelled after releasing a critical investigative report of the government's response to the protests. The report found the government had progressed from "using tear gas to rubber bullets, then real bullets and finally military firepower like assault rifles and grenade launchers", based on an analysis of videos posted on social media. At least 1,400 people involved in the protests were hurt, although that the number was probably "far higher because most people were too afraid to go to public hospitals, where doctors were fired for treating wounded protesters". By July 2019 the international human rights organization Human Rights Watch called on the United States to impose sanctions on Ortega "and other top" Nicaraguan officials "implicated" in the crackdown on protests.

=== Term extension ===
On 20 November 2024, Ortega unveiled proposals to amend the Nicaraguan constitution in order to extend his term from five years to six and have his wife and vice president Rosario Murillo declared co-president. The measures passed in a first reading at the National Assembly on 22 November and passed in a second reading on 30 January 2025. The constitutional reform entered into force on 18 February 2025.

==== 2026 decree banning elections ====
In July 2026, on the 47th anniversary of the Nicaraguan Revolution, Ortega extended his two-decade rule and declared that "there would never be elections here again", explicitly severing any link of Nicaragua remaining a democracy. The next Nicaraguan elections were set to be held in November of that year before being cancelled by Ortega's decree. Exiled opposition leader and 2021 presidential candidate Félix Maradiaga stated that "Ortega buried Nicaraguan democracy a long time ago", and further asserted that Ortega's words were "not words of strength, but words of fear", pointing to internal discontent within the FSLN and purges of the "old guard" of Sandinistas by Ortega's wife Murillo.

=== Foreign policy ===
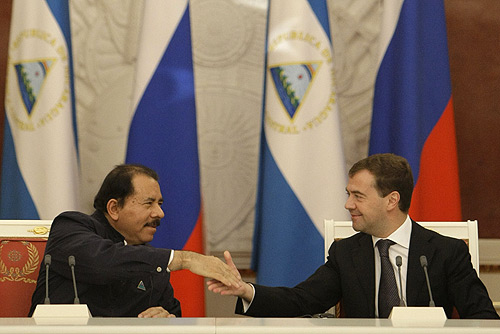
Ortega with Russian President Dmitry Medvedev in Russia on 18 December 2008

Soon after the 2006 election, Ortega paid an official visit to Iran and met Iranian President Mahmoud Ahmadinejad. Ortega told the press that the "revolutions of Iran and Nicaragua are almost twin revolutions ... since both revolutions are about justice, liberty, self-determination, and the struggle against imperialism".

On 6 March 2008, following the 2008 Andean diplomatic crisis, Ortega announced that Nicaragua was breaking diplomatic ties with Colombia "in solidarity with the Ecuadorian people". Ortega also stated, "We are not breaking relations with the Colombian people. We are breaking relations with the terrorist policy practiced by Álvaro Uribe's government". The relations were restored with the resolution at a Rio Group summit held in Santo Domingo, Dominican Republic, on 7 March 2008. At the summit Colombia's Álvaro Uribe, Ecuador's Rafael Correa, Venezuela's Hugo Chávez and Ortega publicly shook hands in a show of good-will. The handshakes, broadcast live throughout Latin America, appeared to signal that a week of military buildups and diplomatic repercussions was over. After the handshakes, Ortega said he would re-establish diplomatic ties with Colombia. Uribe then quipped that he would send him the bill for his ambassador's plane fare.

On 25 May 2008, Ortega, upon learning of the death of FARC guerrilla leader Manuel Marulanda in Colombia, expressed condolences to the family of Marulanda and solidarity with the FARC and called Marulanda an extraordinary fighter who battled against profound inequalities in Colombia. The declarations were protested by the Colombian government and criticized in the major Colombian media outlets.

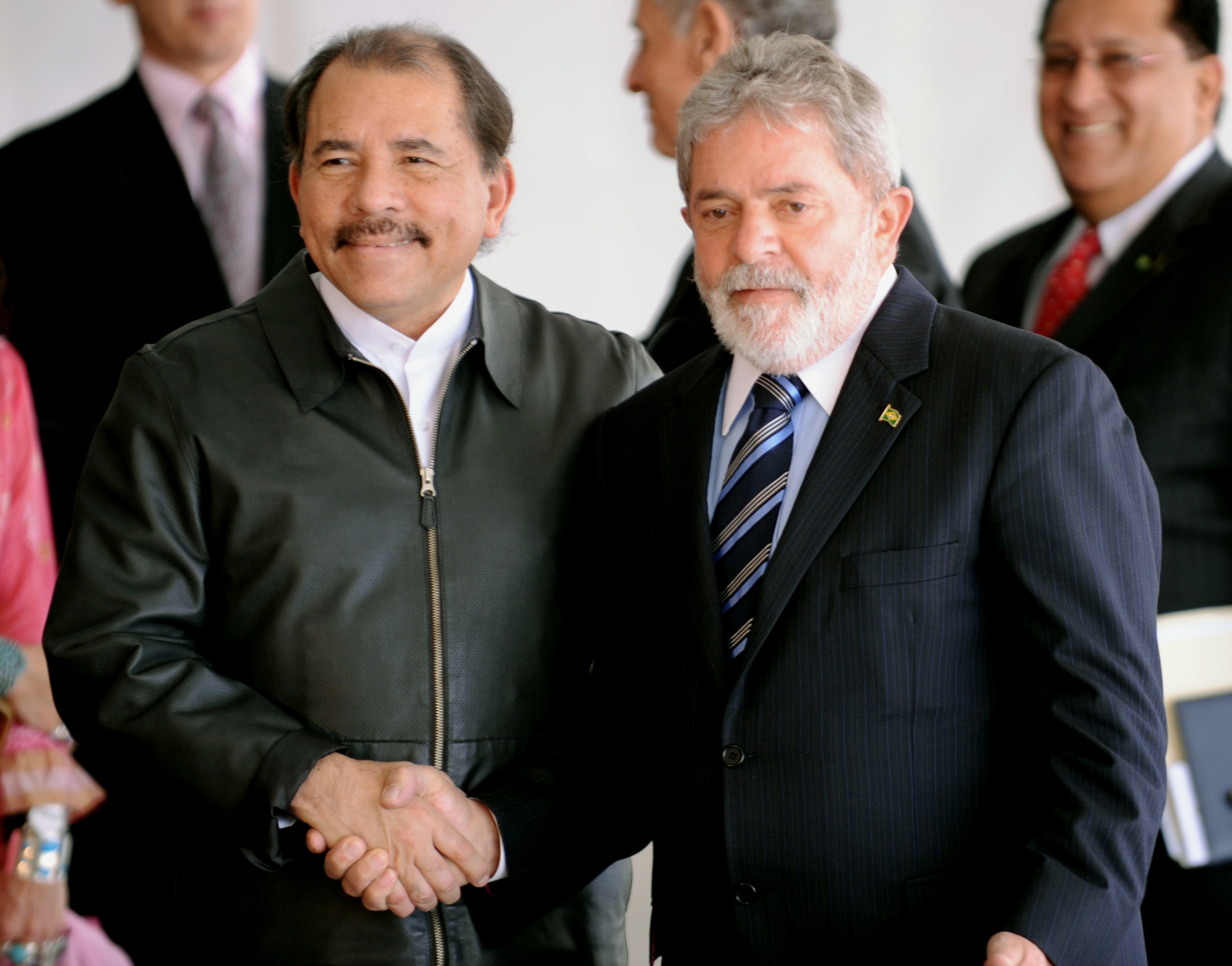
Ortega with Brazilian President Luiz Inácio Lula da Silva at Itamaraty Palace in Brasília, 28 July 2010

On 2 September 2008, during ceremonies for the 29th anniversary of the founding of the Nicaraguan army, Ortega announced that "Nicaragua recognizes the independence of South Ossetia and Abkhazia and fully supports the Russian government's position". Ortega's decision made Nicaragua the second country (after Russia) to recognize the independence of Abkhazia and South Ossetia from Georgia.

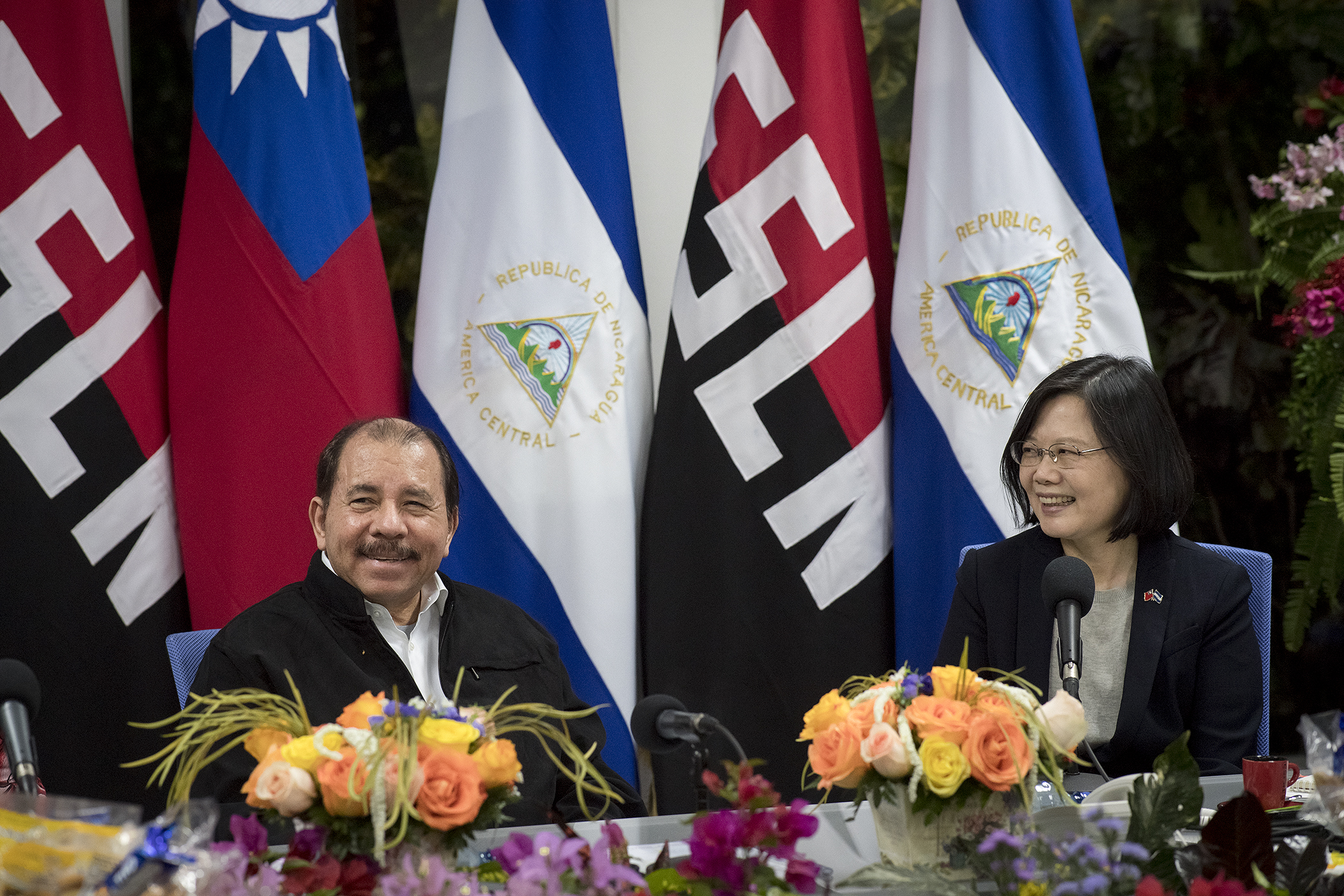
Ortega with the president of the Republic of China Tsai Ing-wen during his fourth inauguration, 10 January 2017

Under Ortega's leadership, Nicaragua joined the Bolivarian Alliance for the Americas.

When seeking office, Ortega threatened to cut diplomatic recognition with the Republic of China (Taiwan, formerly Nationalist China) in order to restore relations with the Mainland-based People's Republic of China (as in the period from 1985 to 1990) as the legal government of China, but he did not do so. In 2007 Ortega stated that Nicaragua did not accept the One China Policy of the PRC government and that Nicaragua reserved the right to maintain official diplomatic relations with the ROC. He reassured President Chen Shui Bian in 2007 that Nicaragua would not break diplomatic relations with the ROC. He explained that during the Reagan administration the United States imposed sanctions on Nicaragua, and cutting ties with Taipei was a sad and painful decision because of the friendship between Nicaragua and Taiwan's people and government. Ortega met with the ROC President Ma Ying-jeou in 2009 and both agreed to improve the diplomatic ties between both countries. However, with a trade show from China (PRC) in Managua in 2010, he is attempting a two-track policy to get benefits from both sides. In 2016 Nicaragua and China (ROC) signed an air services agreement and Ortega stated that Nicaragua's free trade deal with the ROC had benefited both nations. The ROC increased its investment in Nicaragua. In December 2021, Nicaragua once again switched recognition with the PRC.

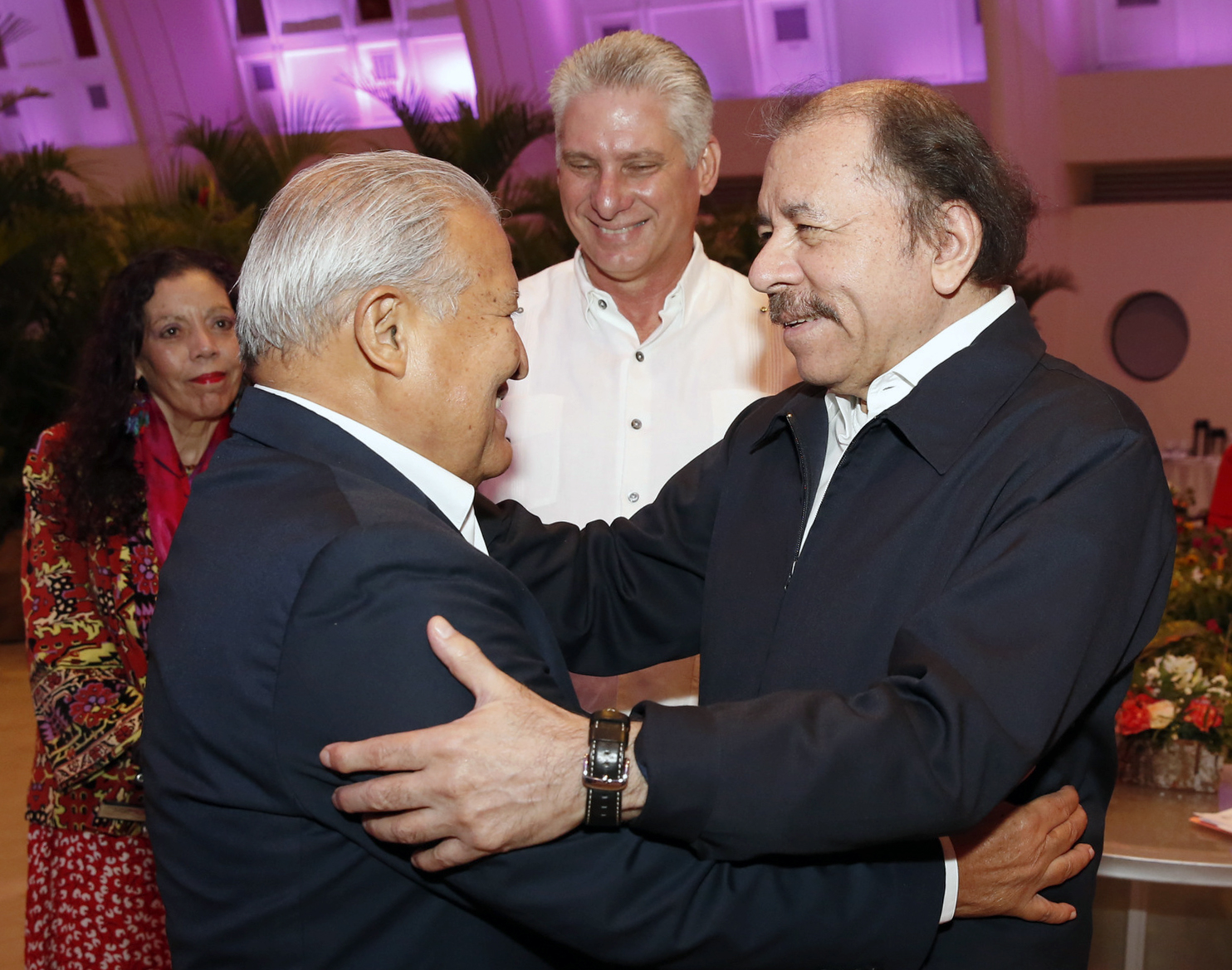
Ortega with El Salvador's President Salvador Sánchez Cerén and Cuban President Miguel Díaz-Canel, 28 March 2019

In September 2010, after a US report listed Nicaragua as a "major" drug-trafficking centre, with Costa Rica and Honduras, Ortega urged the US Congress and Obama administration to allocate more resources to assist the fight against drug trafficking.

During the Libyan Civil War, Ortega was among the very few leaders who spoke out in clear defense of the embattled Muammar Gaddafi. During a telephone conversation between the two, Ortega told Gaddafi that he was "waging a great battle to defend his nation" and stated that "it's at difficult times that loyalty and resolve are put to the test."

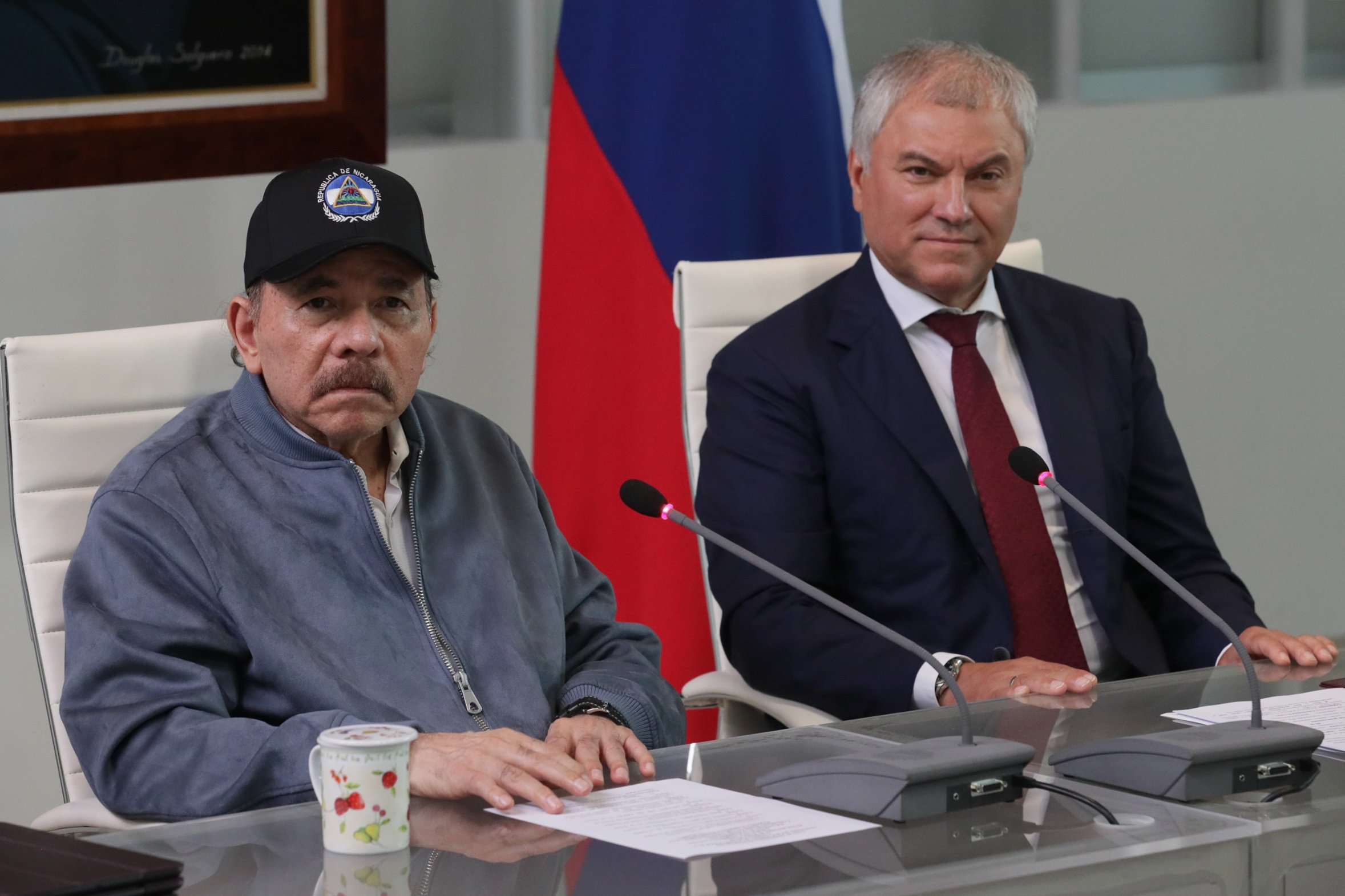
Ortega with Russian Chairman of the State Duma Vyacheslav Volodin, 20 July 2024

Ortega stated that the victory of Bashar al-Assad in the 2014 Syrian election was an important step to "attain peace in Syria and a clear cut evidence that the Syrian people trust their president as a national leader and support his policies which aim at maintaining Syria's sovereignty and unity".

Ortega attended the swearing-in ceremony of Nicolás Maduro for his second term on 10 January 2019.

In an interview with Max Blumenthal in August 2019, Ortega stated that he was open to the idea of Bernie Sanders (who had visited him in 1985) winning the US presidency in 2020 and that Sanders's message "goes in the right direction for the U.S. to become a pole of peace, development, and cooperation".

=== Environmental policy ===
In 2016, Daniel Ortega did not sign the Paris Agreement because he felt the deal did not do enough to protect the climate, although he later changed his mind. Moreover, Nicaragua rejected projects of mining of the Canadian group B2 Gold which could represent a threat to the environment. According to government estimates, Nicaragua has passed from 25% renewable electricity to 52% between 2007 and 2016.

=== International sanctions ===
==== United States ====
In November 2021, Joe Biden signed into law the "Reinforcing Nicaragua's Adherence to Conditions for Electoral Reform Act" (RENACER Act) which extended US sanctions against Nicaragua and gave Biden the power to exclude Nicaragua from the Dominican Republic-Central America Free Trade Agreement (CAFTA-DR) and to obstruct multilateral loans to Nicaragua. Venezuela and Russia condemned the new law.

==== Ukraine ====
In February 2021, Ukraine's parliament, the Verkhovna Rada, approved economic sanctions against Ortega and his government. The sanctions were in response to Ortega sending a delegation to Russian-occupied Crimea in November 2020.

== Personal life ==
Despite his policies towards Catholic church officials and criticizing the church as a "dictatorship," Ortega identifies as a Catholic, saying in a speech that "I would say to his holiness the pope, respectfully, to the Catholic authorities, I am Catholic. As a Christian, I don't feel represented." In the same speech, he also criticized bishops and priests as "killers," "coup plotters" and working on behalf of American imperialism.

Ortega married Rosario Murillo in 1979 in a secret ceremony. They moved to Costa Rica with her three children from a previous marriage. Ortega remarried Murillo in 2005 in order to have the marriage recognized by the Catholic Church, as part of his effort to reconcile with the church. The couple has eight children, three of them together. Murillo serves as the Ortega government's spokeswoman and a government minister, among other positions. Ortega adopted stepdaughter Zoilamérica Ortega Murillo in 1986, through a court case. In 1998, she accused him of sexually abusing her as a child.

== Criticisms and concerns ==
Ortega's second presidency has been subject to much criticism and accusations of his becoming a strongman. The 2018 protests have been pointed to as being symbolic of these tensions. In 2018, Frances Robles wrote in The New York Times that the "many Ortega adult children manage everything from gasoline distribution to television stations" in Nicaragua.

In the months preceding the November 2021 Nicaraguan general election, Ortega's government arrested many prominent opposition members. As of 23 July 2021, opposition leaders have been imprisoned.

On 24 March 2022, the ambassador Arturo McFields, condemned the Ortega government and requested the release of political prisoners, alluding that the government people were "tired of dictatorship" and that it was not easy to denounce it. As a result, he was dismissed.

The American lawyer Paul Reichler also left his position as representative due to "moral conscience", who felt that the president "was no longer the Daniel Ortega whom he respected so much and served with so much pride". Reichler found it inconceivable that someone like Ortega would have mercilessly suppressed peaceful demonstrations and imprisoned his former colleagues in inhumane conditions, and accused him of "murdering" a general by withholding medical treatment. Reichler had served as Nicaragua's international legal adviser before the International Court of Justice, when Managua sued the United States for financing the Contras, winning the case.

The Ortega administration also ordered the closure of the Nicaraguan Language Academy for failing to register as a "foreign agent" ratified by the Sandinista parliament with the favorable vote of 75 deputies of the ruling FSLN.

In response to Ortega's decision to ban elections exiled opposition leader and 2021 presidential candidate Félix Maradiaga stated that "Ortega buried Nicaraguan democracy a long time ago," and further asserted that Ortega's words were "not words of strength, but words of fear," pointing to internal discontent within the FSLN and purges of the "old guard" of Sandinistas by Ortega's wife Murillo. United States Secretary of State Marco Rubio said that Ortega's decision "lays bare their true authoritarian nature" and that the Nicaraguan people "have the right to choose their own leaders through democratic elections."

=== Sexual abuse allegations ===
In 1998, Daniel Ortega's adopted stepdaughter Zoilamérica Narváez released a 48-page report in which she alleged he had sexually abused her from 1979, when she was 12, until 1990. Ortega and his wife Murillo denied the allegation. The case could not proceed in Nicaraguan courts, which have been consistently allied with Ortega, because he had immunity from prosecution as a member of parliament, and the five-year statute of limitations for sexual abuse and rape charges had expired. Narváez's complaint to the Inter-American Human Rights Commission was ruled admissible on 15 October 2001. On 4 March 2002, the Nicaraguan government accepted the commission's recommendation of a "friendly agreement". Narváez withdrew the accusations in 2008. Following the 2016 election, Narváez renewed her accusations and said that she had become an outcast in her family.

A 2019 documentary film Exiliada was released which revolves around Zoilamérica Narváez and her sexual abuse allegations against Ortega.

Another woman, Elvia Junieth, also alleged that she was abused by Ortega in 2005 when she was 15, and, according to her family, a girl was born from that relationship that Ortega did not recognize. Ernesto Moncada Lau, an assistant to Ortega as president, appears on the birth certificate as the father of the minor. Her brother died in the Tipitapa Model prison in November 2021.

== Electoral history ==
=== 1984 general election ===
Candidate	Party	Votes	%
Daniel Ortega	Sandinista National Liberation Front	735,967	66.97
Clemente Guido Chavez	Democratic Conservative Party	154,327	14.04
Virgilio Godoy Reyes	Independent Liberal Party	105,560	9.61
Mauricio Díaz Dávila	Popular Social Christian Party	61,199	5.57
Allan Zambrana Salmerón	Communist Party of Nicaragua	16,034	1.46
Domingo Sánchez Salgado	Nicaraguan Socialist Party	14,494	1.32
Isidro Téllez Toruño	Marxist–Leninist Popular Action Movement	11,352	1.03
Total		1,098,933	100.00
Valid votes		1,098,933	93.91
Invalid/blank votes		71,209	6.09
Total votes		1,170,142	100.00
Registered voters/turnout		1,551,597	75.42
Source: Nohlen

=== 1990 general election ===
Candidate	Party	Votes	%
Violeta Chamorro	National Opposition Union	777,552	54.74
Daniel Ortega	Sandinista National Liberation Front	579,886	40.82
Erick Ramírez Beneventes	Social Christian Party	16,751	1.18
Moisés Hassán	Revolutionary Unity Movement	11,136	0.78
Bonifacio Miranda Bengoechea	Workers' Revolutionary Party	8,590	0.60
Isidro Téllez Toruño	Marxist–Leninist Popular Action Movement	8,115	0.57
Fernando Bernabé Agüero Rocha	Social Conservative Party	5,798	0.41
Blanca Rojas Echaverry	Central American Unionist Party	5,065	0.36
Eduardo Molina Palacios	Democratic Conservative Party	4,500	0.32
Rodolfo Robelo Herrera	Independent Liberal Party for National Unity	3,151	0.22
Total		1,420,544	100.00
Valid votes		1,420,544	94.02
Invalid/blank votes		90,294	5.98
Total votes		1,510,838	100.00
Registered voters/turnout		1,752,088	86.23
Source: Nohlen, Sarti

=== 1996 general election ===
Candidate	Party	Votes	%
Arnoldo Alemán	Liberal Alliance	896,207	50.99
Daniel Ortega	Sandinista National Liberation Front	664,909	37.83
Guillermo Antonio Osorno Molina	Nicaraguan Party of the Christian Path	71,908	4.09
Noel José Vidaurre Argüello	Conservative Party	39,983	2.27
Benjamin Ramón Lanzas Selva	National Project	9,265	0.53
Sergio Ramírez	Sandinista Renovation Movement	7,665	0.44
Francisco José Mayorga Balladares	Bread and Strength Alliance (PAN–ASR)	7,102	0.40
Francisco José Duarte Tapia	National Conservative Action	6,178	0.35
Edgar Enrique Quiñónes Tuckler	Nicaraguan Resistance Party	5,813	0.33
Andrés Abelino Robles Pérez	Nicaraguan Workers, Peasants and Professionals Unity Party	5,789	0.33
Virgilio Godoy	Independent Liberal Party	5,692	0.32
Jorge Alberto Díaz Cruz	National Justice Party	5,582	0.32
Alejandro Serrano Caldera	Unity Alliance	4,873	0.28
Elí Altamirano	Communist Party of Nicaragua	4,802	0.27
Miriam Argüello	Popular Conservative Alliance	4,632	0.26
Ausberto Narváez Argüello	Liberal Unity Party	3,887	0.22
Alfredo César Aguirre	UNO–96 Alliance (PND–MAC–MDN)	3,664	0.21
Allan Antonio Tefel Alba	National Renovation Movement	2,641	0.15
James Odnith Webster Pitts	Democratic Action Party	1,895	0.11
Sergio Abilio Mendieta Castillo	Central American Integrationist Party	1,653	0.09
Moisés Hassán	Renovating Action Movement	1,393	0.08
Gustavo Ernesto Tablada Zelaya	Nicaraguan Socialist Party	1,352	0.08
Roberto Urcuyo Muñoz	Nicaraguan Democratic Party	890	0.05
Total		1,757,775	100.00
Valid votes		1,757,775	95.05
Invalid/blank votes		91,587	4.95
Total votes		1,849,362	100.00
Registered voters/turnout		2,421,067	76.39
Source: Nohlen

=== 2001 general election ===
Candidate	Running mate	Party	Votes	%
Enrique Bolaños	José Rizo	Constitutionalist Liberal Party	1,228,412	56.31
Daniel Ortega	Agustín Jarquín	Sandinista National Liberation Front	922,436	42.28
Alberto Saborío	Consuelo Sequeira	Conservative Party	30,670	1.41
Total			2,181,518	100.00
Registered voters/turnout			2,980,641	–
Source: CSE, IPADE

=== 2006 general election ===
Candidate	Running mate	Party	Votes	%
Daniel Ortega	Jaime Morales Carazo	Sandinista National Liberation Front	854,316	38.07
Eduardo Montealegre	Fabricio Cajina	Nicaraguan Liberal Alliance	650,879	29.00
José Rizo Castellón	Jose Antonio Alvarado	Constitutionalist Liberal Party	588,304	26.21
Edmundo Jarquín	Carlos Mejía	Sandinista Renovation Movement	144,596	6.44
Edén Pastora	Mercedes Tenorio	Alternative for Change	6,120	0.27
Total			2,244,215	100.00
Registered voters/turnout			3,665,141	–
Source: IFES

=== 2011 general election ===
Candidate	Running mate	Party	Votes	%
Daniel Ortega	Omar Halleslevens	Sandinista National Liberation Front	1,569,287	62.46
Fabio Gadea Mantilla	Edmundo Jarquín	Independent Liberal Party	778,889	31.00
Arnoldo Alemán	Francisco Aguirre	Constitutionalist Liberal Party	148,507	5.91
Édgar Enrique Quiñónez Tuckler	Diana Urbina	Nicaraguan Liberal Alliance	10,003	0.40
Róger Antonio Guevara Mena	Elizabeth Rojas	Alliance for the Republic	5,898	0.23
Total			2,512,584	100.00
Source: Supreme Electoral Council

=== 2016 general election ===
Candidate	Running mate	Party	Votes	%
Daniel Ortega	Rosario Murillo	Sandinista National Liberation Front	1,806,651	72.44
Maximino Rodríguez	Martha McCoy	Constitutionalist Liberal Party	374,898	15.03
Pedro Reyes	Yadira Ríos	Independent Liberal Party	112,562	4.51
Saturnino Cerrato	Francisca Chow	Nicaraguan Liberal Alliance	107,392	4.31
Erick Cabezas	Sandra Montoya	Conservative Party	57,437	2.30
Carlos Canales	Nilo Salazar	Alliance for the Republic	35,002	1.40
Total			2,493,942	100.00

=== 2021 general election ===
Candidate	Running mate	Party	Votes	%
Daniel Ortega	Rosario Murillo	Sandinista National Liberation Front	2,093,834	75.87
Walter Espinoza	Mayra Argüello	Constitutionalist Liberal Party	395,406	14.33
Guillermo Osorno	Violeta Martínez	Nicaraguan Party of the Christian Path	89,853	3.26
Marcelo Montiel	Jennyfer Espinoza	Nicaraguan Liberal Alliance	85,711	3.11
Gerson Gutiérrez	Claudia Romero	Alliance for the Republic	48,429	1.75
Mauricio Orué	Zobeyda Rodríguez	Independent Liberal Party	46,510	1.69
Total			2,759,743	100.00

== Foreign honours ==
- Abkhazia
  - Order of Honour and Glory, First Class
- Cuba
  - Order of José Martí
- Peru
  - Order of the Sun of Peru
- Russia
  - Order of Friendship
- South Ossetia
  - Uatsamonga Order

== See also ==
- List of current heads of state and government
- List of heads of the executive by approval rating

== Notes ==
Political offices
Preceded by Francisco Urcuyo as Acting President of Nicaragua	Coordinator of the Junta of National Reconstruction; 1979–1985	Succeeded by Himself as President of Nicaragua
Preceded by Himself as Coordinator of the Junta of National Reconstruction	President of Nicaragua; 1985–1990	Succeeded by Violeta Chamorro
Preceded by Enrique Bolaños	President of Nicaragua; 2007–2025	Succeeded by Succession of Co-president
Preceded by New office	Co-president of Nicaragua; 2025–present	Incumbent
Honorary titles
Preceded by Ligia Alemán as Second Lady	Second Gentleman of Nicaragua; 2017–2025	Vacant
Preceded by Rosario Murillo as sole First Lady	First Gentleman of Nicaragua; 2025–present Served alongside Rosario Murillo	Incumbent
Party political offices
New political party	FSLN nominee for President of Nicaragua; 1984, 1990, 1996, 2001, 2006, 2011, 2016, 2021	Most recent
