= 1984 Nicaraguan general election =

Election in Nicaragua

- 4 November 1984
- Presidential election
- Turnout: 75.42%
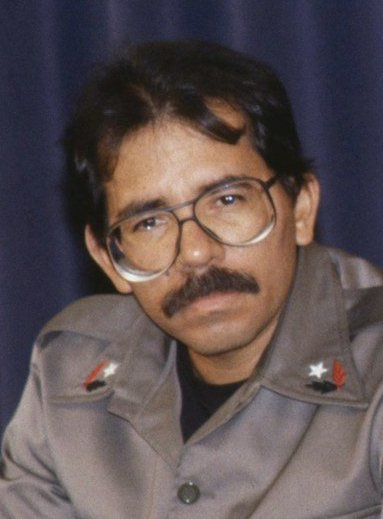

Candidate	Daniel Ortega	Clemente Guido
Party	FSLN	PCD
Running mate	Sergio Ramírez	Merceditas Rodriguez de Chamorro
Popular vote	735,967	154,327
Percentage	66.97%	14.04%
- Results by department
President before election
Daniel Ortega
FSLN
Elected President
Daniel Ortega
FSLN
- Parliamentary election
- 90 of 96 seats in the National Assembly; 46 seats needed for a majority
Party	Leader	Vote %	Seats	+/–
FSLN	Daniel Ortega	66.78	61	New
PCD	Clemente Guido	14.00	13	New
PLI	Virgilio Godoy	9.66	8	New
PPSC	Mauricio Díaz	5.63	5	New
Communist	Allan Zambrana	1.48	1	New
PSN	Domingo Sánchez	1.40	1	New
MAP-ML	Isidro Téllez	1.04	1	New
This lists parties that won seats. See the complete results below.
Results by constituency
President of the National Assembly after
Carlos Núñez; FSLN

General elections were held in Nicaragua on 4 November 1984, to elect a president and parliament. Approximately 1.2 million Nicaraguans voted, representing a 75% turnout, with 94% of eligible voters registered. Three of the opposition parties in Nicaragua boycotted the election. However, American and British observers concluded that the elections were generally free and fair.

The election date, 4 November was selected so that Nicaragua would have a legitimate, elected government in place before the anticipated reelection of U.S. president Ronald Reagan on 6 November. "The Sandinistas hoped that a competitive election with heavy turnout would deter a U.S. military intervention and reassure the FSLN's defenders."

Between 1982 and 1984 the FSLN negotiated with the opposition on the proposed Political Parties Law and Electoral Law, and ultimately these were modified "in response to several of the opposition's most significant demands." Similarly, multiple extensions of the deadline for candidate registration were granted whilst talks with the opposition continued.

== Coordinadora Democrática participation ==
The United States' policy towards Nicaragua played a key role in the election. The Reagan administration was divided over whether or not the rightwing coalition Coordinadora Democrática Nicaragüense ("Democratic Coordinating Committee", CDN) should participate in the elections.

The CDN was a coalition of right-wing parties including the Social Christians, Social Democrats, and the Constitutionalist Liberal Party. Hardliners in the CIA and NSC wanted a boycott, believing participation in the election would only serve to legitimize the Sandinista regime, while moderates in the US State Department thought that the opposition should enter the contest. This division among the administration "only complicated the efforts of the Coordinadora to develop a coherent electoral strategy."

Eventually, pressure from the hardliners and public statements from President Ronald Reagan dismissing the elections as "farcical" gave those in favor of a boycott the upper hand. However, while members of the CDN sought to gain leverage and increase their bargaining power with the Sandinistas, the Reagan administration was not motivated by an interest in helping the opposition, but rather a desire to bolster the contras by undermining the election and to justify their own military pressure against the Sandinista government.

Ultimately, though the CDN decided to abstain, a total of seven political parties took part in the November elections. Of those, three were ideologically to the right of the Sandinistas – the Democratic Conservative Party, the Independent Liberal Party, and the Popular Social Christian Party – and three were to their left – the Communist Party, the Socialist Party, and the Marxist–Lennist Popular Action Movement.

== Results ==
=== President ===
Candidate	Party	Votes	%
Daniel Ortega	Sandinista National Liberation Front	735,967	66.97
Clemente Guido Chavez	Democratic Conservative Party	154,327	14.04
Virgilio Godoy Reyes	Independent Liberal Party	105,560	9.61
Mauricio Díaz Dávila	Popular Social Christian Party	61,199	5.57
Allan Zambrana Salmerón	Communist Party of Nicaragua	16,034	1.46
Domingo Sánchez Salgado	Nicaraguan Socialist Party	14,494	1.32
Isidro Téllez Toruño	Marxist–Leninist Popular Action Movement	11,352	1.03
Total		1,098,933	100.00
Valid votes		1,098,933	93.91
Invalid/blank votes		71,209	6.09
Total votes		1,170,142	100.00
Registered voters/turnout		1,551,597	75.42
Source: Nohlen

=== National Assembly ===
All parties except the FSLN were awarded an additional seat for the party's unsuccessful presidential candidate.

Party	Votes	%	Seats
Sandinista National Liberation Front	729,159	66.78	61
Democratic Conservative Party	152,883	14.00	14
Independent Liberal Party	105,497	9.66	9
Popular Social Christian Party	61,525	5.63	6
Communist Party of Nicaragua	16,165	1.48	2
Nicaraguan Socialist Party	15,306	1.40	2
Marxist–Leninist Popular Action Movement	11,343	1.04	2
Total	1,091,878	100.00	96
Valid votes	1,091,878	93.31	
Invalid/blank votes	78,224	6.69	
Total votes	1,170,102	100.00	
Registered voters/turnout	1,551,597	75.41	
Source: Nohlen

== Aftermath ==
Although assessments from external observers such as Baron Chitnis, the Latin American Studies Association, and the international press were in widely shared agreement that Nicaragua's 1984 election had been free and fair, the Reagan administration denounced the vote as a "Soviet-style sham". The U.S. escalated its diplomatic and propaganda campaign against the Sandinista government and increased military aid to the Contras. "This undercut the new regime's legitimacy abroad and frustrated its hopes that the 1984 vote might smooth the way at home." May 1985 saw a trade embargo imposed by the US, followed by $27 million of "non-lethal" aid to the Contras, supplemented by $37 million of secret "lethal" aid. This led to the October 1985 reimposition of a State of Emergency in Nicaragua.

== Bibliography ==
- Alcántara Sáez, Manuel. Sistemas políticos de América Latina. Madrid: Tecnos. Two volumes. Volume two is "México. Los países del Caribe y de América Central." 1989.
- Alcántara Sáez, Manuel. Sistemas políticos de América Latina. Madrid: Tecnos. Two volumes. Volume two is "México, América Central y el Caribe." Largely rewritten and updated second edition. 1999.
- Anderson, Leslie. "Elections and public opinion in the development of Nicaraguan democracy." Seligson, Mitchell A. and John A. Booth. 1995. Elections and democracy in Central America, revisited. Chapel Hill: The University of North Carolina Press.
- Booth, John A. "Electoral observation and democratic transition in Nicaragua." Electoral observation and democratic transitions in Latin America. 1998. La Jolla: Center for U.S.-Mexican Studies, University of California, San Diego.
- Chomsky, Noam and Edward S. Herman (1988), Manufacturing Consent: The Political Economy of the Mass Media, New York: Pantheon Books - [Chapter 3 focuses on the US media coverage of the 1984 Nicaraguan elections]
- Close, David. "The Nicaraguan elections of 1984." Electoral studies 4, 2:152-158 (August 1985).
- Close, David. Nicaragua : the Chamorro years. Boulder: Lynne Reinner. 1999.
- Cornelius, Wayne A. "The Nicaraguan elections of 1984: a reassessment of their domestic and international significance." Drake, Paul W. and Eduardo Silva. 1986. Elections and democratization in Latin America, 1980–85. La Jolla: Center for Iberian and Latin American Studies, Center for U.S.-Mexican Studies, Institute of the Americas, University of California, San Diego.
- Dunkerley, James. 1988. Power in the isthmus: a political history of Central America. London: Verso.
- Elections in the Americas A Data Handbook Volume 1. North America, Central America, and the Caribbean. Edited by Dieter Nohlen. 2005.
- Fiallos Oyanguren, Mariano. "Nicaragua: sistema de elección de los diputados ante la Asamblea Nacional." Sistemas de elecciones parlamentarias y su relación con la gobernabilidad democrática. 2000. San José: Instituto Interamericano de Derechos Humanos.
- Figueroa Ibarra, Carlos. "Centroamérica: entre la crisis y la esperanza (1978-1990)." Historia general de Centroamérica. 1994. San José: FLACSO. Volume six,
- Goodman, Louis W., ed. Political parties and democracy in Central America. Boulder: Westview Press. 1992.
- Hale, Charles R. "Institutional struggle, conflict and reconciliation: Miskitu Indians and the Nicaraguan state (1979-1985)." Ethnic groups and the nation state: the case of the Atlantic coast in Nicaragua. 1987. Stockholm: University of Stockholm, CIDCA.
- Horton, Lynn. Peasants in arms: war and peace in the mountains of Nicaragua, 1979–1994. Athens: Ohio University, Center for International Studies. 1998.
- Isbester, Katherine. Still fighting: the Nicaraguan women's movement, 1977–2000. Pittsburgh: University of Pittsburgh Press. 2001.
- Luciak, Ilja A. After the revolution: gender and democracy in El Salvador, Nicaragua, and Guatemala. Baltimore: Johns Hopkins University Press. (Also published as Después de la revolución. San Salvador: UCA Editores). 2001.
- Merrill, Tim L., ed. Nicaragua : a country study. Washington: Federal Research Division, Library of Congress. 1994.
- Ortega Hegg, Manuel. "Participación y democracia en Nicaragua." Pasos hacia una nueva convivencia: democracia y participación en Centroamérica. 2001. San Salvador: FUNDAUNGO.
- Payne, Douglas W. The 1996 Nicaragua elections: post-election report. Washington: Center for Strategic and International Studies. 1996.
- Political handbook of the world 1984. New York, 1985.
- Ryan, David. US-Sandinista diplomatic relations: voice of intolerance . London: MacMillan Press Ltd. 1995.
- Smith, Hazel. Nicaragua: self-determination and survival. London : Pluto Press. 1993.
- Weaver, Eric and William Barnes. "Opposition parties and coalitions." Revolution and counterrevolution in Nicaragua. 1991. Boulder: Westview Press.
- Williams, Philip J. "Elections and democratization in Nicaragua: the 1990 elections in perspective." Journal of Interamerican Studies 32, 4:13-34 (winter 1990).
- Williams, Philip J. "Dual transitions from authoritarian rule: popular and electoral democracy in Nicaragua." Comparative politics 26, 2:169-185 (January 1994).
