= Unión Demócrata Cristiana =

Unión Demócrata Cristiana can refer to:

- Christian Democratic Union (Ecuador)
- Christian Democratic Union (Dominican Republic)
- Nicaraguan Christian Democratic Union
