= Democratic Party of National Confidence =

Nicaraguan political party

The Democratic Party of National Confidence (Spanish: Partido Demócrata de Confianza Nacional - PDCN) was a Nicaraguan political party. It was founded by Agustín Jarquín and Adán Fletes after a split from Social Christian Party (PSC) in 1986. The PDCN received legal status on appeal in 1989. It was part of the National Opposition Union (UNO) coalition in 1990 and had 5 seats (of UNO's 51) in the National Assembly. Jarquín was the Sandinista National Liberation Front (FSLN) vice-presidential candidate in the 2001 elections. In 1992, the PDCN and the Popular Social Christian Party (PPSC) formed the Christian Democratic Union (UDC).
