= Isidro Téllez Toruño =

Nicaraguan politician and trade unionist

Isidro Ignacio Téllez Toruño

Personal details
- Born: 1948 (age 77–78)
- Party: Marxist–Leninist Popular Action Movement

Isidro Ignacio Téllez Toruño (born c. 1948) is a Nicaraguan politician and trade unionist. He served as general secretary of the Marxist–Leninist Popular Action Movement (MAP-ML) and is a veteran leader of Frente Obrero ('Workers' Front').

He hails from a family of farm workers in León. In early 1980, he was sentenced to two years of prison labour for statements expressed in the MAP-ML organ El Pueblo, deemed counter-revolutionary by the new government. Téllez Toruño and other personalities sentenced in the same penal case appealed the ruling, and the sentence was revised to three months prison labour.

Téllez Toruño was the presidential candidate of MAP-ML in the 1984 Nicaraguan general election, obtaining 11,352 votes. Téllez Toruño represented the MAP-ML in the National Assembly 1984-1990.

Téllez Toruño was the presidential candidate of MAP-ML in the 1990 Nicaraguan general election. The ticket got 8,115 votes nationwide.

In a statement on International Workers' Day 2017, he denounced that Daniel Ortega had 'hijacked the trade union movement' and called the policies of the Sandinista government 'anti-labour'.
