= Nicaraguan Christian Democratic Union =

Nicaraguan political party

Flag of Unión Democrata Cristiana (UDC)

Unión Demócrata Cristiana (Spanish: Unión Demócrata Cristiana - UDC) is a Nicaraguan political party founded by the center-left Popular Social Christian Party (PPSC) and the center-right Democratic Party of National Confidence (PDCN) in 1992. The UDC was part of the Sandinista National Liberation Front alliance from year 2000 until 2012.
