= Workers' Revolutionary Party (Nicaragua) =

The Workers' Revolutionary Party (Spanish: Partido Revolucionario de los Trabajadores, PRT) is a left-wing Nicaraguan political party with Marxist and Trotskyist tendencies founded 1971 by students including Bonifacio Miranda.

Originally a broad Marxist group named Towards a Popular Revolution, the party joined the Trotskyist United Secretariat of the Fourth International in 1975 and renamed itself the Marxist Revolutionary League. It fought alongside the Sandinista National Liberation Front, but after their victory, remained illegal and its leaders were jailed for criticising the new government.

The group renamed itself PRT in 1984, and received legal status after the 1984 elections.
