= Rationing in Nicaragua =

In 1984, the FSLN announced rationing for 20 basic goods, including rice, sugar, milk, and toilet paper. At this time, the FSLN were fighting an expensive war against the Contra guerrillas who were funded by the Reagan Administration. The FSLN tried to stabilize the economy by focusing more on the production of export crops and less on the production of domestic crops.

In doing this they also had to implement rationing so that the consumption of domestic crops would be lowered. The war made it very hard to sustain the economy and Nicaragua’s regular economy took a direct hit. Trade and investment plummeted, unemployment soared to 25 percent, and inflation reached more than 36,000 percent by 1988. From 1980 to 1990, Nicaragua’s average real per capita income fell 35 percent, and the incidence of poverty rose to 44 percent.

== See also ==
- Rationing in Cuba
