= Allan Zambrana Salmerón =

Nicaraguan lawyer, politician and trade unionist

Allan Adolfo Zambrana Salmerón (born circa 1954) is a Nicaraguan lawyer, politician and trade unionist.

== Biography ==
He was active in labour organizing in the 1970s, and was jailed at several times by the Somoza regime. He was a leader of the United People's Movement (Movimiento Pueblo Unido). He served as the general secretary of the Central de Acción y Unificación Sindical (CAUS) trade union centre. After the victory of the Nicaraguan Revolution, he was a member of the State Council (representing CAUS). In October 1981 the State Council revoked his immunity, as he was sentenced to 29 months imprisonment for violating the Public Order Law. He was recognized as a prisoner of conscience by Amnesty International.

Zambrana Salmerón was the Communist Party of Nicaragua candidate for the presidency in the 1984 Nicaraguan general election. He obtained 16,034 votes (1.5%). He was a member of the National Assembly 1984-1990. In the 1990 Nicaraguan general election, he became an alternate member of the National Assembly for deputy Elí Altamirano.

As of the early 1990s, Zambrana Salmerón was one of seven members of the politburo of the Communist Party of Nicaragua. He was later expelled from the Communist Party.

He served on the board of the Permanent Commission for Human Rights (CPDH).
