= Henry Ruiz =

Nicaraguan revolutionary leader

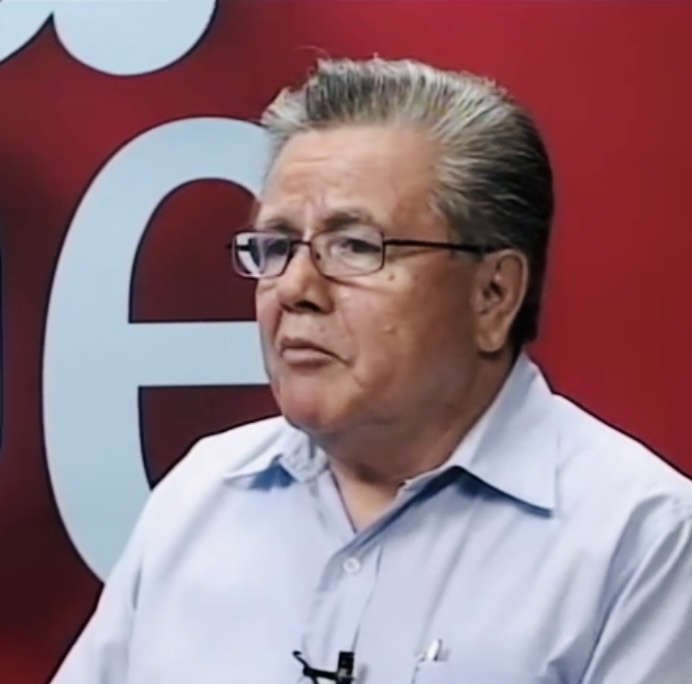
- Ruiz in 2016
- Born: Henry Ildefenso Ruiz Hernandez; 1940 (age 85–86); Jinotepe, Carazo
- Occupations: Guerilla; Politician
- Title: Commandante; Minister of Planning; Minister of Foreign Cooperation
- Movement: Sandinista National Liberation Front; Sandinista Renovation Movement

Henry Ildefenso Ruiz Hernández (born 1940) is a Nicaraguan politician. He is a former guerilla and one of the nine commandants of the Sandinista (FSLN) Directorate, announced in Havana in March 1979, that overthrew the Somoza regime in July 1979. With Tomás Borge and Bayardo Arce, he represented the Prolonged Popular War (GPP) faction. Following the revolution, he was Minister of Planning from 1979 to 1985 when he became Minister of Foreign Cooperation.
He later left the FSLN, joining Sergio Ramírez and Dora María Téllez to lead the Sandinista Renovation Movement (MRS).

== Early life ==
Henry Ruiz was born in Jinotepe in 1940 to a modest family. As a child, he won the national elementary school award for best student, awarded by Luis Somoza Debayle.
