= Democratic Conservative Party =

Nicaraguan political party

The Democratic Conservative Party (Spanish: Partido Conservador Demócrata, PCD) is a Nicaraguan political party with a traditional conservative ideology. The party was formed in 1979. Clemente Guido participated as PCD's presidential candidate in the 1984 elections, winning 14 percent of the vote and finishing in second place behind Daniel Ortega of the Sandinista National Liberation Front (FSLN).
