= Popular Social Christian Party =

Nicaraguan political party

1984 election poster of PPSC

The Popular Social Christian Party (Spanish: Partido Popular Social Cristiano - PPSC), was a Nicaraguan political party. It was an offshoot of the Social Christian Party formed in the late 1970s when Manolo Morales led schism from the PSC.

The party supported the FSLN against the Somoza regime, but after Somoza's fall from power they ran against the Sandinistas. The PPSC advocated for mixed economy rather than the fully socialist vision of the FSLN.

The PPSC won 6 seats (out of 90) in the 1984 Legislative elections and 3 seats (out of 110) seats in the 1990 elections. In 1992 the PPSC and the Democratic Party of National Confidence (PDCN) formed the Christian Democratic Union (UDC).
