= Luis Carrión Cruz =

Nicaraguan politician (born 1952)

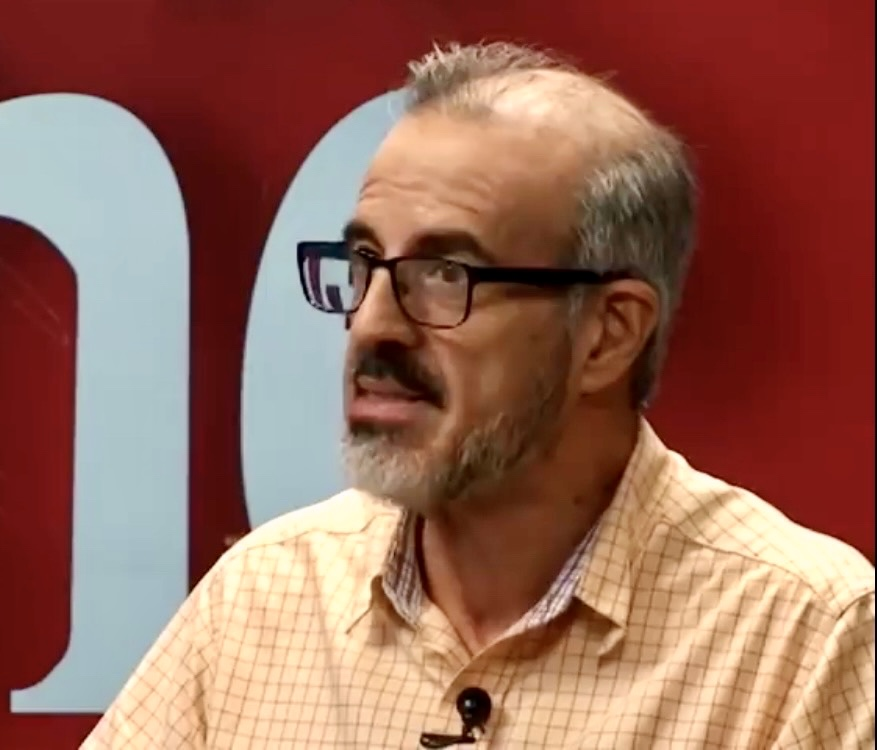
- Luis Carrión Cruz in 2018

First Vice-Minister of the Interior
- In office 1980–1988

Minister of Economy, Industry and Commerce
- In office 1988–1990

Personal details
- Born: 1952 (age 73–74)
- Citizenship: Nicaragua
- Party: Marxist-Leninist Proletarian Tendency; Sandinista National Liberation Front; Sandinista Renovation Movement
- Known for: Commander of the Nicaraguan Revolution

Luis Fernando Carrión Cruz (born 1952) is a Nicaraguan politician. He is a former guerilla and one of the nine commandantes of the Sandinista (FSLN) National Directorate that overthrew the Somoza regime in 1979. Born to a wealthy, politically-connected family, he began college in the United States but returned to Nicaragua, first joining a radical Catholic group then the FSLN. He led the Carlos Roberto Huembes Eastern Front in Chontales during the final offensive of the revolution. He was a government minister and member of the FSLN National Directorate until 1995 when he split with party and became a cofounder of the Sandinista Renovation Movement (MRS).

== Early life ==
Born in 1952, Carrión grew up in a wealthy family in Nicaragua. His father Luis Carrión Montoya was a banker and one of the largest stockholders in BANIC, a financial group that controlled much of the Nicaraguan economy before 1979. As a child, Carrión was an excellent student, named top sixth-grader in the country in 1964, and eventually becoming valedictorian at his Catholic high school in Managua. Following his graduation, he spent one year at Phillips Exeter Academy in New Hampshire, where he was on the honor roll, and graduated in 1970. He then matriculated at Rensselaer Polytechnic Institute in Troy, New York. While in the US, he participated in Vietnam War protests, and was influenced by the episodes of racism he witnessed as well as the broad disparities between the relative luxury in US and the severe poverty in Nicaragua. He left college to return to Nicaragua.

== Sandinista National Liberation Front ==
Carrión joined a radical Catholic group in one of Managua's impoverished neighborhoods, working with Father Uriel Molina and then became a revolutionary. In 1974 he formed the first Christian Sandinista National Liberation Front (FSLN) cell with Joaquín Cuadra and Álvaro Baltodano. In October 1975, he and Jaime Wheelock were purged from the FSLN as part of the urban Marxist-Leninist Proletarian Tendency (TP) faction (they advocated a traditional Marxist focus on developing worker power, which brought them into conflict with those favoring guerrilla warfare, the Prolonged Popular War faction (GPP), influenced by the Chinese and Vietnamese). However Carrión was named to the reunified FSLN National Directorate announced in Havana, Cuba in May 1979. He was the youngest member of the Directorate.

Carrión led the Carlos Roberto Huembes Eastern Front in Chontales during the final offensive of the revolution.

In April 1980, following the fall of the Somoza government in July 1979, Carrión became First Vice-Minister of the Interior, serving until 1988 when he became Minister of Economy, Industry and Commerce, where he worked until the FSLN left office in 1990.

== Sandinista Renovation Movement ==
He resigned the National Directorate and the FSLN party in 1995, becoming one of the founders of the Sandinista Renovation Movement (MRS) with Sergio Ramírez and Dora María Téllez. In 2005 and 2006, Carrión was head of the MRS campaign for Herty Lewites, who was running for President of Nicaragua against FSLN's Daniel Ortega and Nicaraguan Liberal Alliance candidate Eduardo Montealegre, until Lewites died of a heart attack in July 2006.

During the 2018 anti-government protests and wave of repression from the FSLN government, Carrión called for Ortega to step down.

In June 2021, following the arrests of opposition pre-candidates in the 2021 Nicaraguan general election and other civic figures, Carrión went into exile saying he faced arrest if he stayed in Nicaragua.

In 2023, Carrión was stripped of his Nicaraguan citizenship.

== Personal life ==
Many of Carrión's family members are also involved in Nicaraguan politics. These include his brother Carlos Carrión Cruz, who was head of the Sandinista Youth and then Political Secretary for the FSLN, and sister Gloria Carrión Cruz, General Secretary of AMNLAE, the Sandinista women's group; as well as uncle Arturo Cruz and cousins Arturo Cruz Jr. (both of whom served as Nicaraguan political officials and diplomats) and Javier Carrión McDonough.

He earned a Masters in Public Administration from Harvard Kennedy School.
