= Uriel Molina =

Nicaraguan theologian (born 1931)

Father Uriel Molina (born October 6, 1931) is a Nicaraguan theologian who is one of the most prominent leaders of the liberation theology-oriented "popular church" in Sandinista-era Nicaragua. Tomás Borge was a childhood friend of his.

In Molina's personal memoirs, he analyzes the connection between the impact of the revolution and the integral part that the Catholic Church and the beliefs of the people played in its successes and failures. As a native of Nicaragua, ordained in Rome as a Franciscan, and an honors student with cum laude status in possession of a doctorate in theology, Molina is knowledgeable about the Somoza regime and the escalating conflicts between the country's government and its people. It ignites his passion for pastoral work, and encourages him to leave Rome soon after his ordination.

Molina begins his pastoral contributions at a small Roman Catholic parish in Managua. He immerses himself into the surrounding community and public issues. As a priest, Molina is able to interact with the people on a daily basis and connect to them on a spiritual level. He gains their trust as they confess to him their thoughts on the revolution and the Somoza regime. Molina begins teaching and preaching liberation-theology that would benefit his people during the harsh times. He is placed in a predicament because of his beliefs, and finds himself becoming a part of the Sandinista movement. Secretly within catacombs he educates the youth on the truth about revolution, and the future of an independent Nicaragua which it can achieve.

Some of the most important Sandinistas had lived with him in a commune in Managua's poor El Riguero barrio before joining the Sandinista National Liberation Front, including Joaquín Cuadra, Álvaro Baltodano, and Luis Carrión. During the civil war, El Riguero, with its Christian based communities, was a rebel stronghold. After the Sandinista victory, they helped him establish the Antonio Valdivieso Center. Today there are still a few of Molina's students that are leaders of the FSLN.
