= Carlos Fonseca =

Nicaraguan founder of the FSLN (1936–1976)

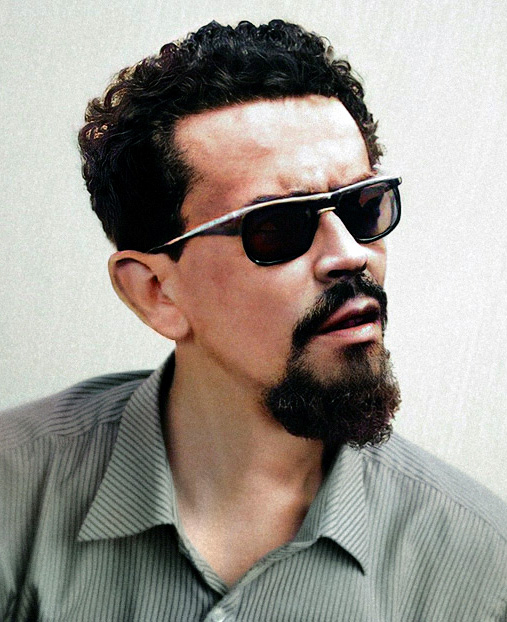
- Fonseca pictured, 1970.

Secretary-General of the Sandinista National Liberation Front (Note: Fonseca was named political and military chief in January 1969.)
- In office February 1969 – 8 November 1976

Personal details
- Born: Carlos Fonseca Amador; 23 June 1936 El Laborio, Matagalpa, Nicaragua
- Died: 8 November 1976 (aged 40) Boca de Piedra, Zelaya, Nicaragua
- Cause of death: Killed in action
- Resting place: Plaza de la Revolución, Managua, Nicaragua
- Party: Nicaraguan Socialist Party (1954–1959); FSLN (from 1961)
- Spouse: María Haydeé Terán (m. 1965–1976)
- Children: 2
- Parents: Fausto Amador Alemán; Justina Fonseca Úbeda
- Education: National Institute of the North
- Alma mater: UNAN
- Occupation: Teacher; Revolutionary

Carlos Fonseca Amador (23 June 1936 – 8 November 1976) was a Nicaraguan professor, politician, writer and revolutionary who was one of the founders of the Sandinista National Liberation Front (FSLN). Fonseca was later killed in the mountains of the Zelaya Department, Nicaragua, three years before the FSLN took power. He has posthumously received the titles of National Hero of Nicaragua and Commander in Chief of the Sandinista Popular Revolution.

== Early years ==
Carlos Fonseca Amador was born in the El Laborío neighborhood of the city of Matagalpa on 23 June 1936. He was the son of Agustina Fonseca Úbeda, from San Rafael del Norte, a peasant and cook, and Fausto Amador Alemán, a member of a wealthy coffee-growing family and administrator of the La Reina mine in San Ramón, Matagalpa. Fonseca was born in a "corner house" his aunt Isaura owned, where his mother lived in a back room. At the age of 9, he began selling candies that his mother made and later sold newspapers on the streets of the city. His father did not acknowledge Fonseca as his son until his elementary school years.

Fonseca's father broke from the Conservative Party to align himself with the Somoza regime, managing several Somoza enterprises and acquiring large land holdings in the Managua and Matagalpa regions. Although his father later helped him go to school and educate himself and occasionally invited him to his mansion in Matagalpa, Fonseca held greater admiration for his mother because of her work ethic and strength. Because of this, Fonseca inverted the usual naming convention in Latin America and used her surname first, and was consequently known as Carlos Fonseca Amador. His relationship with his father was more ambivalent: Fonseca admired his father's intelligence and abilities and wanted his approval but opposed his politics and privilege.

In 1950 Fonseca entered secondary school at the Instituto Nacional del Norte (INN, National Institute of the North), where he was named best student in his class while also working odd jobs during holiday breaks. He became best friends there with Tomás Borge, with whom he shared a fondness for the writings of Thomas More, John Steinbeck and Howard Fast. A voracious reader, he studied French to be able to read works that were available only in that language while working his way through the library's section devoted to the history of the US.

== Early political activity ==
Fonseca also began his work in opposition to the Somoza dictatorship while at the INN by participating in a strike that demanded the removal of a plaque honoring Somoza from the University of León campus. Around this time he attended meetings of a Conservative Party youth group and joined the Unión Nacional de Acción Popular (UNAP, National Union of Popular Action), a party led by intellectuals who had taken part in the anti-Somoza demonstrations of the mid-1940s. He left the UNAP in 1953 or 1954, however, later complaining they were "too well off economically, ... too perfumed, too bourgeoisified" and not active enough against the Somoza regime.

Fonseca became increasingly interested in Marxism and joined the Partido Socialista Nicaragüense (PSN, Nicaraguan Socialist Party) in 1954. In 1955, after graduating from INN, Fonseca moved to Managua, where he was named director of the library at the Miguel Ramírez Goyena Institute. He combined that work with studies at the School of Economics of the National University.

The following year he moved to León, Nicaragua and enrolled in the Faculty of Law while working at the La Prensa agency. He remained active in the PSN, devoting himself to student organizing and forming a student cell of the Party with Silvio Mayorga and Tomás Borge.

Fonseca still embraced the PSN's commitment to peaceful and gradualist political struggle against the Somoza dictatorship and did not approve of the September 21, 1956 shooting of Anastasio Somoza García by Rigoberto López Pérez. Fonseca was nonetheless arrested in Matagalpa six days after the assassination when Anastasio Somoza García's son and successor, Luis Somoza Debayle, declared a state of siege, arresting hundreds of students and other dissidents. Some were held for several years; Fonseca was held until November 14, 1956, when he was released without charges, possibly due to his father's intervention.

In 1957, Fonseca traveled to the Soviet Union as a PSN delegate to the 6th World Festival of Youth and Students organized by the World Federation of Democratic Youth. Fonseca later wrote a book chronicling his visit to the USSR entitled Un Nicaragüense en Moscú ("A Nicaraguan in Moscow"). The book featured uncritical praise of the accomplishments of the Soviet government, including its "free press, complete freedom of religion and the efficiency of its worker-run industries." He returned to Nicaragua on December 16 and was immediately arrested at the Las Mercedes International Airport in Managua by the Guardia Nacional.

In March 1958 he signed the Minimum Program of the Movilización Republicana (MR, Republican Mobilization) party, which called for a general amnesty and the return of exiles. He took part in the day of protest of the visit to the University by Milton S. Eisenhower, brother of the then-president of the United States. He organized a student strike in November to demand the release of Tomás Borge and other students who had been in prison since the assassination of Somoza. He was arrested several times, in Managua and Matagalpa.

In March 1959 he helped found Juventud Democrática Nicaragüense (JDN, Nicaraguan Democratic Youth). Fonseca and his allies hoped to use the JDN to attract youth outside the relatively small number of university students to the resistance to the Somoza regime, primarily by leading demonstrations and painting slogans against tyranny on walls, while pointing out the shortcomings of the Unión Nacional Opositora (UNO, National Opposition Union) controlled by the Conservative Party.

== Taking up arms ==
Fidel Castro and the 26th of July Movement took power in Cuba on January 1, 1959. In February of that year, Fonseca, as well as many other more prominent Nicaraguan radicals, traveled to Cuba.

The Cuban Revolution was a major event all over Latin America and sparked both great concern and a sense of possibility in Nicaragua. The Cuban Revolution was a central event in Fonseca's political evolution as it convinced him that a revolution was possible and that organisation to prepare for that was necessary. He also came to believe that the PSN was not suited to that task and that a Nicaraguan revolutionary movement could be created outside of the PSN and other existing groups.

Others felt the same, as the rebel victory in Cuba was mirrored by an increase in armed anti-Somoza actions in Nicaragua. In 1959 Fonseca left Guatemala for Honduras and joined the "Rigoberto López Pérez" guerrilla column led by Commander Rafael Somarriba. That group had the support of the Cuban government through Che Guevara in the fight against the Somoza dictatorship; there were also numerous Cuban members in the column.

On June 24, 1959, the brigade was ambushed by Honduran and Nicaraguan troops in El Chaparral, Honduras, ending in the death of several rebels and the wounding and capture of many others, including Fonseca, who suffered a bullet wound to the lung. He was treated at the San Felipe General Hospital in Tegucigalpa.Fonseca was eventually flown, along with other guerillas held by Honduras, to Cuba.

The incident marked the end of Fonseca's relationship with the PSN. Whereas Fonseca's revolutionary zeal increased in the aftermath of the ambush, the PSN became convinced that a revolution in Nicaragua was impossible. Labeling Fonseca and other Nicaraguans who fought in the brigade as too "guerrilla-ist," the PSN expelled Fonseca and the others.

The failed incursion led to another incident that would have lasting impapct on the anti-Somoza movement, when the Guardia Nacional fired on a peaceful student demonstration in León, called to demand proper care for Fonseca and to protest the killings at El Chaparral, killing four students and two bystanders and wounding nearly a hundred others, on July 23, 1959. Nearly the entire city turned out for the funeral march the next day and both students and faculty forced the University to permanently bar the Guardia Nacional from the campus. The student movement—sometimes referred to as "the Generation of '59"—took on a more radical cast than the earlier "Generation of '44" that had been aligned with the Conservative and Liberal Parties.

The JDN that Fonseca had helped found collapsed in 1959. It was soon followed by Juventud Revolucionaria Nicaragüense (JRN, Nicaraguan Revolutionary Youth), which operated primarily in Costa Rica and was just as ineffective, and then by Juventud Patriótica Nicaragüense (JPN, Nicaraguan Patriotic Youth), a group originally founded by children of Conservative Party members opposed to Somoza that led a number of protests throughout the country. It, too, later folded, following Luis Somoza's declaration of a state of siege in November 1960. These short-lived groups did, however, leave a tradition of militant street action, solidarity with the Cuban revolution, and independence from both the existing mainstream parties and the PSN.

== Sandinista ==
Once in Cuba, Fonseca began to seriously study Augusto César Sandino, whom Fidel Castro and Che Guevara respected greatly; Guevara repeatedly cited Sandino as a revolutionary hero. Fonseca also began to host political meetings in a small apartment in the Miramar section of Havana that were frequented by a number of Nicaraguan exiles who would later become part of the FSLN.

On his return to Nicaragua, after visits to Venezuela and Costa Rica, he was arrested again and extradited to Guatemala where he was confined in El Petén and made friends with the future Commander of the Fuerzas Armadas Revolucionarias (FAR, Revolutionary Armed Forces) of Guatemala, Luis Augusto Turcios Lima. Fonseca escaped from custody and fled to El Salvador, from which he returned to Nicaragua via Havana with the help of Tomás Borge and Julio Jérez.

=== Initial attempts at insurrection ===
Between 1959 and 1963, Fonseca and those who would become the earliest members of the FSLN began to organise in the hopes of forming a true revolutionary organization. In 1961, together with other comrades, Fonseca founded the Movimiento Nueva Nicaragua (MNN, New Nicaragua Movement). The MNN had three cells, in Managua, León and Estelí. He published "The Ideology of Sandino" at this time. The MNN then transformed itself into a group known as the Frente de Liberación Nacional (FLN, the National Liberation Front), which took its name from the movement fighting French colonialism in Algeria.

At a meeting of the FLN held in Honduras in July, Fonseca proposed the name "Sandinista National Liberation Front" for the armed revolutionary organization. His suggestion met opposition from more orthodox Marxists within the organization who argued that Sandino fought against foreign occupation but not imperialism. It took several years for the organization to rename itself the Frente Sandinista de Liberación Nacional.

Together with the veteran Sandinista Santos López, Fonseca studied the possibility of armed struggle on the ground reaching the banks of the Coco River. Inspired by the example of the Cuban Revolution, and in particular Castro and Guevara's insistence on the primary role of an armed uprising, while giving less importance to political organizing among the peasantry and urban workers, Fonseca and Santos López tried to copy the Cuban movement's tactics, down to adopting a timetable modeled on the amount of time that passed from the outbreak of hostilities in Cuba's Sierra Maestra mountains to the guerrillas's march into Havana.

The results were disastrous. In mid-1963, a poorly-armed, largely inexperienced and disorganized guerrilla cadre entered the Rios Coco y Bocay area of Nicaragua. Largely unable to communicate with the Sumo-speaking peasants of the region, and having done little advance work in the area, several guerrillas were killed by the Guardia Nacional in a confrontation in August, while Fonseca and others were able to make it across the Honduran border over the next month.

=== Turn away from guerrilla tactics ===
The rout of the FSLN guerrillas in 1963 nearly eliminated the organization. As Jacinto Suárez, who joined the FSLN in 1963 in Managua, later said, the organization's membership at that time amounted to only ten guerrillas in the mountains and twenty or so youths in Managua and León. "Those were years in which we had nothing—we have to admit it—we had absolutely nothing! A wood frame for making silk-screen posters. One safe house. A box of colored markers. A few yards of cloth. Two pistols at the most. And plenty of desire to do something.".

In June 1964, Fonseca and Víctor Tirado were arrested in Managua. The two (along with four others) were accused of plotting to assassinate Anastasio Somoza Debayle. Rather than present a defense during his trial, Fonseca leveled charges against Somoza which were later detailed in his essay, From Prison, I Accuse the Dictatorship.

On January 6, 1965, Fonseca was deported to Guatemala, then deported to Mexico a few days later. He married María Haydée Terán, with whom he had fallen in love in prison, later that year. While Fonseca continued to hold the top leadership position in the FSLN during this period, he was out of the country for much of it, writing several pieces about the poet Rubén Darío while working with colleagues within Nicaragua.

In his speech to the court Fonseca had acknowledged the weakness of the FSLN and advocated instead seeking unity with other anti-Somocista and revolutionary forces. That translated in practice into educational work and community organizing, creating indoctrination classes and campaigning to bring resources to working-class neighborhoods in Managua. These efforts were largely unsuccessful, as the FSLN lost ground among students while making little or no progress expanding its membership elsewhere. Fonseca later condemned this turn to legal work instead of armed struggle as a mistake that nearly led to the FSLN's disappearance as an independent revolutionary force.

=== Years of clandestine struggle, prison and exile ===
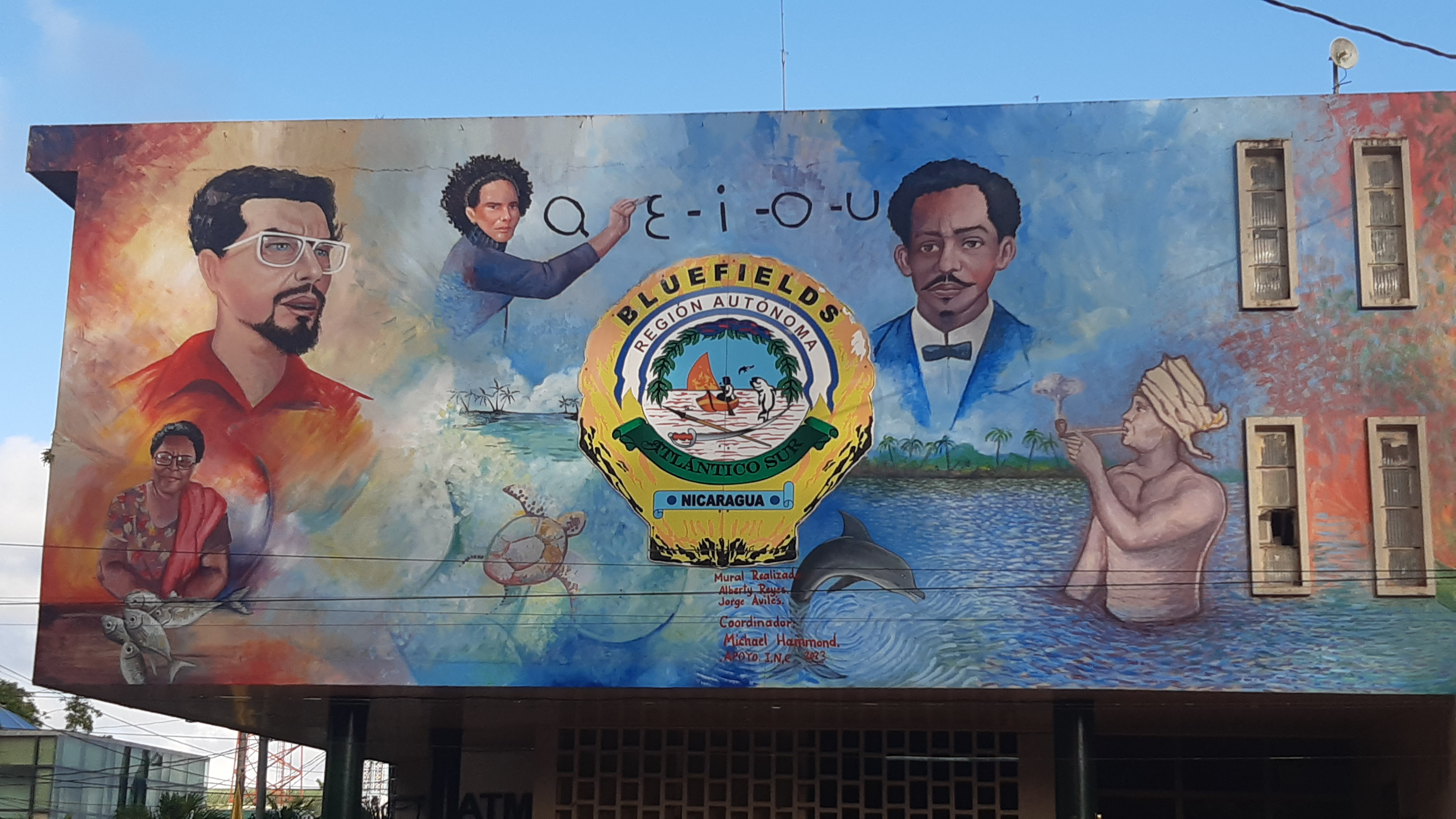
Fonseca pictured on a mural in Bluefields

By mid-1966, plans for a second FSLN guerrilla operation in the Pancasan region (near Matagalpa) were under way. The operation began in May 1967 with about forty guerrillas. This time, the guerrillas were better trained and armed and had women among their ranks. Fonseca, along with a few other FSLN leaders were committed to the inclusion of women, but some of the other fighters were not comfortable fighting alongside women.

Like the earlier guerrilla incursion, the Pancasan operation ended with many of the FSLN guerrillas killed by the Guardia Nacional and the survivors retreating to Honduras. However, Fonseca and the others who survived considered the operation a political victory "because it showed the whole country that the FSLN still existed". The FSLN adopted an even more uncompromising attitude, criticizing other opposition groups as well as its own members for their lack of revolutionary commitment.

The state responded to the Pancasan operation by increasing the repression of the peasantry, forcing the FSLN to redirect its efforts to organizing underground urban networks. The FSLN created a network of safe houses and developed a culture of pseudonyms, code words and other security measures, while assassinating one of the Somoza regime's torturers and robbing banks and businesses to raise money for the movement.

Fonseca escaped capture by hiding in the homes of people not associated with the FSLN, most notably his stay, disguised as a priest, for a week in November 1967 in the second floor of the Managua home of Dame Angelica Balladares de Arguello, who had been the former President of the Feminist League, "Woman of the Américas" in 1959, and since 1926 known as "The First Lady of Nicaraguan Liberalism". His efforts to escape detection gave rise to a body of legends about his supposed skill at disguising himself and slipping past the police and military.

Fonseca left the underground life in Nicaragua for Costa Rica, where he reassessed the last few years of legal and guerrilla activity in an essay titled Hora Cero, while writing the first draft of what became known as the Programa Historico, which was then circulated among other members of the FSLN leadership. Those able to travel to Costa Rica adopted the program in July or August 1969.

On August 31, 1969 he was captured in a house in Alajuela, Costa Rica. An operation to obtain his release ended in failure in December; his wife María Haydée Terán and Humberto Ortega were captured in the effort. Supporters in France and El Salvador demanded that Costa Rica release Carlos Fonseca and his companions, but it was not until October 21, 1970 that they were released after FSLN militants seized two American executives of United Fruit Company by highjacking a Costa Rican commercial flight on which they were passengers, then exchanging them for Fonseca, Ortega and the other prisoners involved in the failed prison break attempt. Fonseca left first for Mexico, then Cuba, where he remained until 1975.

While in exile Fonseca undertook extensive research on Nicaragua's history in the nineteenth and twentieth century, producing five books and essays about Sandino and several short works about Rigoberto López Pérez, who assassinated Anastasio Somoza García in 1956.

=== Divisions within the Sandinista movement ===
During his years in Havana disagreements over fundamental issues of political direction surfaced between the exiles and those still working in Nicaragua and among the exiles: how much to emphasize military tactics rather than political organizing, whether to focus on urban rather than rural warfare, the role that different social classes should play in the struggle, the timing and pace of revolutionary action, vanguardism, and alliances with other parties and groups. These differences eventually produced three distinct factions within the FSLN: (1) the Prolonged Popular War (GPP) faction, led by Fonseca, Borge, and Henry Ruíz, that emphasized guerrilla war, (2) the Proletarian Tendency, led by Jaime Wheelock Román, Luis Carrión, and Carlos Nuñez, which focused on organizing factory workers and barrio dwellers, and (3) the Tercerista faction of Humberto Ortega Saavedra, Daniel Ortega Saavedra, and Víctor Tirado, which worked to establish tactical alliances with businessmen, religious leaders, and professionals. These ideological conflicts were deepened by the personal animosities between some leaders: as an example, Borge and Wheelock not only disagreed on ideological issues but loathed each other.

Fonseca attempted to address these divisions by urging each tendency to avoid ideological rigidity, but failed; while the FSLN did not split, factional rivalries persisted. Factionalism reached its height in 1975, when the National Directorate expelled the principal leaders of the Proletarian Tendency, dealing a serious blow to the FSLN's urban support base. Those differences were not resolved until 1979, on the eve of victory over Somoza and several years after Fonseca's death.

=== Return to Nicaragua and death ===
Fonseca had been planning to resume his work within Nicaragua since 1970. The crisis within the movement finally moved him in 1975 to return to Nicaragua, where he met with those activists in charge of the FSLN's urban networks at a safe house outside Managua to discuss their political disagreements and to create the support needed for a military assault on the regime.

Fonseca died on November 8, 1976, in the area known as Boca de Piedra located at the foot of Cerro Zinica in the region of the same name in the municipality of Waslala, between Waslala and Siuna, in the department of Zelaya in the Autonomous Region of the North Caribbean Coast of Nicaragua. Eyewitnesses indicate that Carlos Fonseca was killed after being captured.

=== Legacy ===
While Tomás Borge was in prison in Matagalpa a colonel in the National Guard told him that Fonseca had died, to which Borge replied "You are mistaken, Colonel, Carlos Fonseca is among the dead who never die." That remark set the tone for the FSLN's subsequent treatment of Fonseca, particularly after the revolution that finally drove the last Somoza out of Nicaragua.

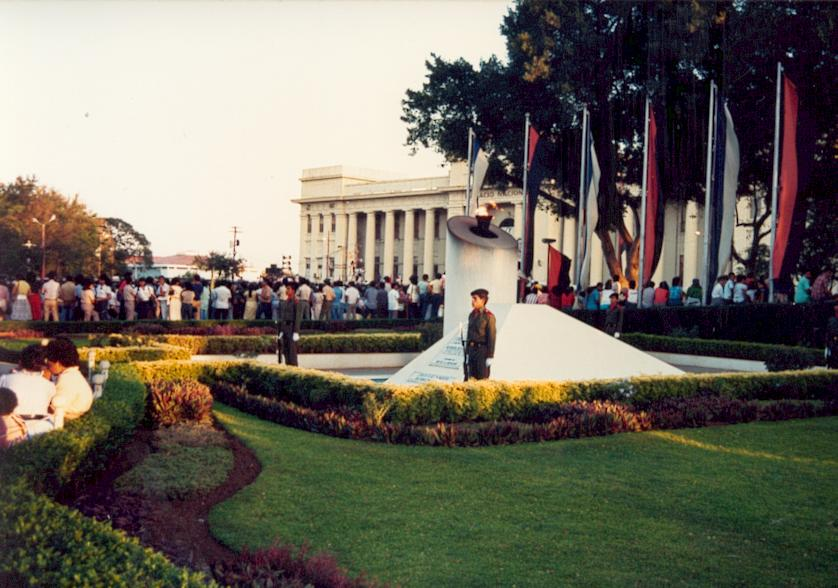
Mausoleum of Carlos Fonseca

In the mid 1980s, musician Paul Kantner traveled to Nicaragua out of concern for the Sandinista situation. While in the country, he was given a song called "Comandante Carlos Fonseca", written by composer Carlos Mejía Godoy and revolutionary Tomás Borge. After reforming Jefferson Starship in the 1990s, he added the song to his repertoire, eventually recording the song for the 2008 album Jefferson's Tree of Liberty.

Yet while the FSLN continued to pay tribute to the memory of "a safely dead and saintly Carlos", it departed from many of the policies he argued for in his years in exile, giving less priority to land reform and elevating military necessity over popular mobilization in fighting the contras.

=== Personal life ===
Fonseca married María Haydée Terán in exile in Mexico in 1965. María Haydée was two years younger than Carlos, from a well-known family of liberal dissidents in León; her father and brother were members of the Independent Liberal Party (PLI). Her family owned a publishing house, Editorial Antorcha, and a bookstore near the University. She maintained contacts with student activists and participated in different protests against the dictatorship. María Haydée met Carlos Fonseca at a clandestine meeting but did not know who he was until her boyfriend at that time, Octavio Robleto, heard the description of the meeting and told her.

On November 24, 1966, their son Carlos was born. Their daughter Tania was born on January 29, 1969.

=== Allegations of KGB links ===
In his book The World Was Going Our Way, Vasily Mitrokhin relates that, as part of the KGB's Aleksandr Shelepin's strategy of using national liberation movements to advance the Soviet Union's foreign policy in the Third World, Shelepin organized funding and training in Moscow for twelve individuals handpicked by Fonseca, who were the core of the new Sandinista organization. However, Russia historian J. Arch Getty, writing in the American Historical Review, raised questions about the trustworthiness and verifiability of Mitrokhin's material about the Soviet Union, doubting whether this "self-described loner with increasingly anti-Soviet views" would have had the opportunity to "transcribe thousands of documents, smuggle them out of KGB premises", etc. Former Indian counter-terrorism chief Bahukutumbi Raman also questions both the validity of the material and the conclusions drawn from them.

== Writings ==
- Un nicaragüense en Moscú [A Nicaraguan in Moscow] (1958)
- Breve análisis de la lucha popular nicaragüense contra la dictadura Somoza [Brief Analysis of the Popular Nicaraguan Struggle Against the Somoza Dictatorship] (1960)
- Desde la cárcel Yo acuso a la dictadura [From Prison I Accuse the Dictatorship] (1964)
- Nicaragua Hora Cero [Nicaragua Zero Hour] (1969)
- Sandino Guerrillero Proletario [Sandino: Proletarian Guerrilla] (1972)
- Reseña de la secular intervención norteamericana en Nicaragua [Review of a Century of US intervention in Nicaragua]
- [Chronology of Sandinista Resistance] (1972)
- Notas sobre la Carta-testamento de Rigoberto López Pérez [Notes on the Legacy of Rigoberto López Pérez] (1972)
- Crónica secreta: Augusto César Sandino ante sus verdugos [Secret Chronicle: Augusto César Sandino Confronts His Betrayers] (1974)
- ¿Qué es un Sandinista? [Who Is a Sandinista?] (1975)
- Notas sobre la montaña y algunos otros temas (1976)
