= Sandinista National Liberation Front =

Political party in Nicaragua

Sandinista National Liberation Front Frente Sandinista de Liberación Nacional
- Abbreviation: FSLN
- Secretary-General: Daniel Ortega
- Spokesperson: Gustavo Porras
- Founders: Carlos Fonseca; Silvio Mayorga [es]; Tomás Borge; Casimiro Sotelo
- Founded: 26 July 1961 (65 years, 105 days)
- Headquarters: Leal Villa De Santiago De Managua, Managua
- Newspaper: La Voz del Sandinismo
- Youth wing: Sandinista Youth
- Women's wing: AMNLAE
- Armed wing: Sandinista Popular Army (1979–1995)
- Membership (1990): <95,700
- Ideology: Sandinismo; Socialism of the 21st century; Christian left; Christian socialism; Socialism; Liberation theology; Left-wing populism; Anti-imperialism; Historical: Marxism–Leninism; Castroism
- Political position: Left-wing to far-left
- Religion: Roman Catholicism
- National affiliation: United Alliance Nicaragua Triumphs
- Regional affiliation: Parliamentary Left Group
- Continental affiliation: São Paulo Forum; COPPPAL (until 2021)
- International affiliation: Socialist International (until 2019); For the Freedom of Nations! (since 2024); Sovintern (since 2026)
- Union affiliate: Sandinista Workers' Centre
- Colors: Official: Red; Black; Customary: Carmine red
- Slogan: Cristiana, Socialista, Solidaria
- National Assembly: 75 / 90 (83%)
- Central American Parliament: 15 / 20 (75%)

Party flag

The Sandinista National Liberation Front (Spanish: Frente Sandinista de Liberación Nacional, FSLN) is a socialist political party in Nicaragua. Its members are called Sandinistas (Spanish pronunciation: [sandiˈnistas]) in both English and Spanish. The party is named after Augusto César Sandino, who, in the 1930s, led the resistance against the country's occupation by the United States.

The FSLN overthrew Anastasio Somoza Debayle in the 1979 Nicaraguan Revolution, ending the Somoza family's political control of Nicaragua, and established a revolutionary government in its place. Having seized power, the Sandinistas ruled Nicaragua from 1979 to 1990, first as part of a Junta of National Reconstruction. Following the resignation of centrist members from this Junta, the FSLN took exclusive power in March 1981. They instituted literacy programs, nationalization, land reform, and devoted significant resources to healthcare, but came under international criticism for human rights abuses, including mass execution and oppression of indigenous peoples. They were also criticized for their management of the economy and inflation.

A US-backed group, known as the Contras, was formed in 1981 to overthrow the Sandinista government and was funded and trained by the Central Intelligence Agency. The United States sought to place economic pressure on the Sandinista government by imposing a full trade embargo and by planting underwater mines in Nicaragua's ports. In 1984, free and fair elections were held, but were boycotted by three opposition parties. The FSLN won the majority of the votes, and those who opposed the Sandinistas won approximately a third of the seats. The civil war between the Contras and the government continued until 1989. After revising the constitution in 1987, and after years of fighting the Contras, the FSLN lost the 1990 election to Violeta Barrios de Chamorro in an election marked by US interference, but retained a plurality of seats in the legislature.

The FSLN is now Nicaragua's dominant party. Since the 2006 Nicaraguan general election when Daniel Ortega was reelected President of Nicaragua, Ortega and the FSLN have centralized power and overseen democratic backsliding in Nicaragua. In October 2009, the Supreme Court, with a majority of Sandinista judges, overturned presidential term limits that were set by the constitution. Ortega and the FSLN were reelected in the presidential elections of 2011, 2016, and 2021, although these elections have been denounced by international observers. The party is firmly controlled by Ortega.

== History ==
=== Origin of the term Sandinista ===
The Sandinistas took their name from Augusto César Sandino (1895–1934), the leader of Nicaragua's nationalist rebellion against the US occupation of the country during the early 20th century (ca. 1922–1934). The suffix "-ista" is the Spanish equivalent of "-ist".

Sandino was assassinated in 1934 by the Nicaraguan National Guard (Guardia Nacional), the US-equipped police force of Anastasio Somoza, whose family ruled the country from 1936 until they were overthrown by the Sandinistas in 1979.

=== Precursor to Revolution (1933–1961) ===
The second U.S. intervention in Nicaragua ended when Juan Bautista Sacasa of the Liberal Party won the elections. By 1 January 1933 there wasn't a single US soldier left on Nicaraguan soil; however, in 1930, the US had formed a group for national security known as the National Guard. The National Guard remained after the exit of the U.S. under the leadership of Anastasio Somoza Garcia who was supported by the US. On 21 February 1934, Somoza, using the National Guard, assassinated Sandino, who opposed and fought against US intervention. This was the first act of a series that Somoza, with help from the US, would take, that would culminate in his election as president in 1936. The result of his election was the start of the US-sponsored dictatorship of the Somoza family.

During the 1960s, leftist ideas began spreading worldwide, sparking independence movements in different colonial territories. On 1 January 1959 in Havana, Cuban revolutionaries fought against dictator Fulgencio Batista. In Algeria the Algerian National Liberation Front was founded to fight against French colonial control. In Nicaragua, different movements that opposed the Somoza dynasty began to unite, forming the Nicaraguan National Liberation Front, which would later be renamed the Sandinista National Liberation Front.

The economic situation of Nicaragua in the mid-20th century had deteriorated as the prices of agricultural exports such as cotton and coffee dropped. Politically, the conservative party of Nicaragua split, and one of the factions, the Zancudos, began collaborating with the Somoza regime.

Anastasio Somoza Garcia was assassinated by poet Rigoberto Lopez Perez in 1956.

In 1957 Carlos Fonseca Amador, Silvio Mayorga, Tomás Borge, Oswaldo Madriz y Heriberto Carrillo formed the first cell of the Nicaraguan Revolutionary Committee who identified with the issues of the proletariat. Later that October, the Mexican cell was formed with members such as Edén Pastora Gómez, Juan José Ordóñez, Roger Hernández, Porfirio Molina y Pedro José Martínez Alvarado.

In October 1958 Ramon Raudales began his guerrilla war against the Somoza dynasty, beginning the armed conflict.

In June 1959 an event known as "El Chaparral" occurred in Honduran territory bordering Nicaragua. The guerrilla fighters "Rigoberto López Pérez" under the command of Rafael Somarriba (in which Carlos Fonseca was integrated) was found and annihilated by the Honduran Army in coordination with the intelligence services of the Nicaraguan National Guard.

After "El Chaparral", several more armed rebellions took place. In August the journalist Manuel Díaz y Sotelo died; in September Carlos "Chale" Haslam died; in December Heriberto Reyes (Colonel of the Defensive Army of National Sovereignty) died. The following year, events known as "El Dorado" (February 28, 1960) took place, leading to several deaths including Luis Morales, Julio Alonso Leclair (head of the September 15 column), Manuel Baldizón, and Erasmo Montoya.

The conventional opposition, up to that point led by the Nicaraguan Socialist Party, had not been able to form a common front against the dictatorship. The opposition to the dictatorship was established around various student organizations. Among its leaders in the early 1960s was Carlos Fonseca Amador.

At the start of 1961, the New Nicaragua Movement (NNM) was founded by prominent leaders in education, such as Fonseca, Silvio Mayorga, Tomás Borge, Gordillo, Navarro y Francisco Buitrago; prominent leaders on workers issues such as Jose Benito Escobar; countryside leaders like Germán Pomares, and small business leaders such as Julio Jerez Suárez. Legendary guerrilla veteran Santos Lopez, who fought with Augusto Cesar Sandino, also participated in the NNM.

The New Nicaragua Movement was established in three cities: Managua, Leon and Estelí; however, they were generally stationed in Honduras. Their first public activity was held in March 1961, in support of the Cuban revolution and in protest of the position that the Nicaraguan government held with Cuba. The NNM later dissolved to make way for the National Liberation Front.

The New Nicaragua Movement soon dissolved with its members forming the National Liberation Front, FLN.

=== Founding (1961–1970) ===
The FSLN originated in the milieu of various oppositional organizations, youth and student groups in the late 1950s and early 1960s. The university of Léon, and the National Autonomous University of Nicaragua (UNAN) in Managua were two of the principal centers of activity. Inspired by the Revolution and the FLN in Algeria, the FSLN was founded in 1961 by Carlos Fonseca, Silvio Mayorga, Tomás Borge, Casimiro Sotelo and others as The National Liberation Front (FLN). Only Borge lived long enough to see the Sandinista victory in 1979.

A congress or assembly is not formed between all the prominent leaders of the various groups as the preparation would have required a prior theoretical process in order to create them. As a result, the FSLN was not prepared for its own formation. Different discussions took place within the group as they came to a consensus on political ideas. Even in 1963, while still under the name of FLN, there was a lack of internal coherence in political ideas (this can be seen in the publication of the newspaper Trinchera). The first few years were carried by some basic shared values of all the forces that were being integrated. Some of these basic shared ideas was to imitate the success of the Cuban Revolution, the ineffectiveness of the conventional opposition to the Somoza regime and the need to remain independent of them (referring to the conservative, liberal and communist parties), the need for a revolutionary movement that would use the armed struggle as opposition to the Somoza dictatorship, and after some discussion, identification with Sandino's struggle. It was not until 1969 that any programmatic document was published.

The Sandinista National Liberation Front was supposedly founded in a meeting in Tegucigalpa (Honduras) between Carlos Fonseca, Tomás Borge, and Silvio Mayorga. It's even been said that the meeting was held on July 19, 1961. In reality, there is no documentary reference that supports this affirmation, with the first news of this meeting and date surfacing after the revolutionary triumph of 1979.

The term "Sandinista" was adopted two years later, establishing continuity with Sandino's movement, and using his legacy to develop the newer movement's ideology and strategy. By the early 1970s, the FSLN was launching limited military initiatives.

=== Rise (1970–1976) ===
On December 23, 1972, a magnitude 6.2 earthquake leveled the capital city, Managua. The earthquake killed 10,000 of the city's 400,000 residents and left another 50,000 homeless. About 80% of Managua's commercial buildings were destroyed. President Anastasio Somoza Debayle's National Guard embezzled much of the international aid that flowed into the country to assist in reconstruction, and several parts of downtown Managua were never rebuilt. The president gave reconstruction contracts preferentially to family and friends, thereby profiting from the quake and increasing his control of the city's economy. By some estimates, his personal wealth rose to US$400 million in 1974.

In December 1974, a guerrilla group affiliated with FSLN directed by Eduardo Contreras and Germán Pomares seized government hostages at a party in the house of the Minister of Agriculture in the Managua suburb Los Robles, among them several leading Nicaraguan officials and Somoza relatives. The siege was carefully timed to take place after the departure of the US ambassador from the gathering. At 10:50 pm, a group of 15 young guerrillas and their commanders, Pomares and Contreras, entered the house. They killed the minister, who tried to shoot them, during the takeover. The guerrillas received US$2 million ransom, and had their official communiqué read on the radio and printed in the newspaper La Prensa.

Over the next year, the guerrillas got 14 Sandinista prisoners released from jail, and with them were flown to Cuba. One of the released prisoners was Daniel Ortega, who later became president of Nicaragua. The group also lobbied for an increase in wages for National Guard soldiers to 500 córdobas ($71 at the time). The Somoza government responded with further censorship, intimidation, torture, and murder.

In 1975, Somoza imposed a state of siege, censoring the press, and threatening all opponents with internment and torture. Somoza's National Guard also increased its violence against people and communities suspected of collaborating with the Sandinistas. Many of the FSLN guerrillas were killed, including its leader and founder Carlos Fonseca in 1976. Fonseca had returned to Nicaragua in 1975 from his exile in Cuba to try to reunite factions that existed in the FSLN. He and his group were betrayed by someone who informed the National Guard that they were in the area. The guerrilla group was ambushed, and Fonseca was wounded in the process. The next morning the National Guard executed Fonseca.

=== Split (1977–1978) ===
After the FSLN's defeat at the battle of Pancasán in 1967, it adopted the "Prolonged Popular War" (Guerra Popular Prolongada, GPP) theory as its strategic doctrine. The GPP was based on the "accumulation of forces in silence": while the urban organization recruited on the university campuses and robbed money from banks, the main cadres were to permanently settle in the north central mountain zone. There they would build a grassroots peasant support base in preparation for renewed rural guerrilla warfare.

As a consequence of the repressive campaign of the National Guard, in 1975 a group within the FSLN's urban mobilization arm began to question the GPP's viability. In the view of the young orthodox Marxist intellectuals, such as Jaime Wheelock, economic development had turned Nicaragua into a nation of factory workers and wage-earning farm laborers. Wheelock's faction was known as the "Proletarian Tendency".

Shortly after, a third faction arose within the FSLN. The "Insurrectional Tendency", also known as the "Third Way" or Terceristas, led by Daniel Ortega, his brother Humberto Ortega, and Mexican-born Victor Tirado Lopez, was more pragmatic and called for tactical, temporary alliances with non-communists, including the right-wing opposition, in a popular front against the Somoza regime. By attacking the Guard directly, the Terceristas would demonstrate the regime's weakness and encourage others to take up arms.

In October 1977, a group of prominent Nicaraguan professionals, business leaders, and clergymen allied with the Terceristas to form "El Grupo de los Doce" (The Group of Twelve) in Costa Rica. The group's main idea was to organize a provisional government in Costa Rica. The Terceristas' new strategy also included unarmed strikes and rioting by labor and student groups coordinated by the FSLN's "United People's Movement" (Movimiento Pueblo Unido – MPU).

=== Insurrection (1978) ===
On January 10, 1978, Pedro Joaquín Chamorro, the editor of the opposition newspaper La Prensa and leader of the "Democratic Union of Liberation" (Unión Democrática de Liberación – UDEL), was assassinated. His assassins were not identified at the time, but evidence implicated Somoza's son and other members of the National Guard. Spontaneous riots followed in several cities, while the business community organized a general strike demanding Somoza's resignation.

The Terceristas carried out attacks in early February in several Nicaraguan cities. The National Guard responded by further increasing repression and using force to contain and intimidate all government opposition. The nationwide strike that paralyzed the country for ten days weakened private enterprises and most of them decided to suspend their participation in less than two weeks. Meanwhile, Somoza asserted his intention to stay in power until the end of his presidential term in 1981. The United States government showed its displeasure with Somoza by suspending all military assistance to the regime, but continued to approve economic assistance to the country for humanitarian reasons.

In August, the Terceristas took hostages. Twenty-three Tercerista commandos led by Edén Pastora seized the entire Nicaraguan congress and took nearly 1,000 hostages, including Somoza's nephew José Somoza Abrego and cousin Luis Pallais Debayle. Somoza gave in to their demands and paid a $500,000 ransom, released 59 political prisoners (including GPP chief Tomás Borge), broadcast a communiqué with FSLN's call for general insurrection and gave the guerrillas safe passage to Panama.

A few days later six Nicaraguan cities rose in revolt. Armed youths took over the highland city of Matagalpa. Tercerista cadres attacked Guard posts in Managua, Masaya, León, Chinandega and Estelí. Large numbers of semi-armed civilians joined the revolt and put the Guard garrisons of the latter four cities under siege. The September Insurrection of 1978 was subdued at the cost of several thousand, mostly civilian, casualties. Members of all three factions fought in these uprisings, which began to blur the divisions and prepare the way for unified action.

=== Reunification (1979) ===
In early 1979, President Jimmy Carter and the United States ended support for the Somoza government, but did not want a left-wing government to take power in Nicaragua. This was a crucial moment for what many historians call "Latin America's Cold War", as the Somoza regime fell apart without assistance from the United States. The moderate "Broad Opposition Front" (Frente Amplio Opositor – FAO), which opposed Somoza, was made up of a conglomeration of dissidents within the government as well as the "Democratic Union of Liberation" (UDEL) and the "Twelve", representatives of the Terceristas (whose founding members included Casimiro A. Sotelo, later to become Ambassador to the U.S. and Canada representing the FSLN). The FAO and Carter came up with a plan to remove Somoza from office but give the FSLN no government power. The FAO's efforts lost political legitimacy, as the grassroots support of the FSLN wanted more structural changes and was opposed to "Somocism without Somoza".

The "Twelve" abandoned the coalition in protest and formed the "National Patriotic Front" (Frente Patriotico Nacional – FPN) together with the "United People's Movement" (MPU). This strengthened the revolutionary organizations as tens of thousands of youths joined the FSLN and the fight against Somoza. A direct consequence of the spread of the armed struggle in Nicaragua was the official reunification of the FSLN that took place March 7, 1979. Nine men, three from each tendency, formed the National Directorate that led the reunited FSLN: Daniel Ortega, Humberto Ortega and Víctor Tirado (Terceristas); Tomás Borge, Bayardo Arce Castaño, and Henry Ruiz (GPP faction); and Jaime Wheelock, Luis Carrión and Carlos Núñez.

=== Nicaraguan Revolution ===
The FSLN evolved from one of many opposition groups to a leadership role in the overthrow of the Somoza regime. By mid-April 1979, five guerrilla fronts opened under the FSLN's joint command, including an internal front in Managua. Young guerrilla cadres and the National Guardsmen were clashing almost daily in cities throughout the country. The Final Offensive's strategic goal was the division of the enemy's forces. Urban insurrection was the crucial element because the FSLN could never hope to outnumber or outgun the National Guard.

On June 4, the FSLN called a general strike, to last until Somoza fell and an uprising was launched in Managua. On June 16, the formation of a provisional Nicaraguan government in exile, consisting of a five-member Junta of National Reconstruction, was announced and organized in Costa Rica. The members of the new junta were Daniel Ortega (FSLN), Moisés Hassán (FPN), Sergio Ramírez (the "Twelve"), Alfonso Robelo (MDN) and Violeta Barrios de Chamorro, the widow of La Prensa's director Pedro Joaquín Chamorro. By the end of that month, with the exception of the capital, most of Nicaragua was under FSLN control, including León and Matagalpa, Nicaragua's two largest cities after Managua.

On July 9, the provisional government in exile released a government program in which it pledged to organize an effective democratic regime, promote political pluralism and universal suffrage, and ban ideological discrimination, except for those promoting the "return of Somoza's rule". On July 17, Somoza resigned, handed over power to Francisco Urcuyo, and fled to Miami. While initially seeking to remain in power to serve out Somoza's presidential term, Urcuyo ceded his position to the junta and fled to Guatemala two days later.

On July 19, the 18th anniversary of the foundation of the FSLN, the FSLN army entered Managua, culminating the first goal of the revolution. The war left 30,000–50,000 dead and 150,000 Nicaraguans in exile. The five-member junta entered Managua the next day and assumed power, reiterating its pledge to work for political pluralism, a mixed economic system, and a nonaligned foreign policy.

=== Sandinista rule (1979–1990) ===
The Sandinistas inherited a country with a debt of US$1.6 billion, an estimated 30,000 to 50,000 war dead, 600,000 homeless, and a devastated economic infrastructure. To begin establishing a new government, they created a Council (or junta) of National Reconstruction, made up of five appointed members. Three of the appointed members—Sandinista militants Daniel Ortega, Moisés Hassán, and novelist Sergio Ramírez (a member of Los Doce "the Twelve")—belonged to the FSLN. Two opposition members, businessman Alfonso Robelo, and Violeta Barrios de Chamorro (the widow of Pedro Joaquín Chamorro), were also appointed. Only three votes were needed to pass law.

The FSLN also established a Council of State, subordinate to the junta, which was composed of representative bodies. But the Council of State gave political parties only 12 of 47 seats; the rest were given to Sandinista organizations. Of the 12 seats reserved for political parties, only three were not allied with the FSLN. Due to the rules governing the Council of State, in 1980 both non-FSLN junta members resigned. Nevertheless, as of the 1982 State of Emergency, opposition parties were no longer given representation in the council. The preponderance of power also remained with the Sandinistas through their mass organizations, including the Sandinista Workers' Federation (Central Sandinista de Trabajadores), the Luisa Amanda Espinoza Nicaraguan Women's Association (Asociación de Mujeres Nicaragüenses Luisa Amanda Espinoza), the National Union of Farmers and Ranchers (Unión Nacional de Agricultores y Ganaderos), and most importantly the Sandinista Defense Committees (CDS). The Sandinista-controlled mass organizations were extremely influential over civil society and saw their power and popularity peak in the mid-1980s.

Upon assuming power, the FSLN's official political platform included nationalization of property owned by the Somozas and their supporters; land reform; improved rural and urban working conditions; free unionization for all workers, both urban and rural; price fixing for commodities of basic necessity; improved public services, housing conditions, education; abolition of torture, political assassination and the death penalty; protection of democratic liberties; equality for women; non-aligned foreign policy; and formation of a "popular army" under the leadership of the FSLN and Humberto Ortega.

The FSLN's literacy campaign sent teachers into the countryside; within six months, half a million people had been taught rudimentary reading, bringing the national illiteracy rate down from over 50% to just under 12%. Over 100,000 Nicaraguans participated as literacy teachers. One of the literacy campaign's aims was to create a literate electorate that could make informed choices in the promised elections. The success of the literacy campaign was recognized by UNESCO with a Nadezhda Krupskaya International Prize, although the actual success of this literary campaign, and its long-term impact, have been called into question.

The FSLN also created neighborhood groups similar to the Cuban Committees for the Defense of the Revolution, called Sandinista Defense Committees (Comités de Defensa Sandinista or CDS). Especially in the early days following Somoza's overthrow, the CDSes served as de facto units of local governance. Their obligations included political education, organizing Sandinista rallies, distributing food rations, organizing neighborhood/regional cleanup and recreational activities, policing to control looting, and apprehending counter-revolutionaries. The CDSes organized civilian defense efforts against Contra activities and a network of intelligence systems in order to apprehend their supporters. These activities led critics of the Sandinistas to argue that the CDS was a system of local spy networks for the government used to stifle political dissent, and the CDS did hold limited powers—such as the ability to suspend privileges such as driver licenses and passports—if locals refused to cooperate with the government. After the initiation of heavier U.S. military involvement in the Nicaraguan conflict the CDS was empowered to enforce wartime bans on political assembly and association with other political parties (i.e., parties associated with the Contras).

By 1980, conflicts began to emerge between the Sandinista and non-Sandinista members of the governing junta. Violeta Chamorro and Alfonso Robelo resigned from the junta in 1980, and rumors began that members of the Ortega junta would consolidate power among themselves. These allegations spread, and rumors intensified that it was Ortega's goal to turn Nicaragua into a state modeled after Cuban socialism. In 1979 and 1980, former Somoza supporters and ex-members of Somoza's National Guard formed irregular military forces, while the original core of the FSLN began to splinter. Armed opposition to the Sandinista government eventually divided into two main groups: The Fuerza Democrática Nicaragüense (FDN), a U.S.-supported army formed in 1981 by the CIA, U.S. State Department, and former members of the Somoza-era Nicaraguan National Guard; and the Alianza Revolucionaria Democratica (ARDE) Democratic Revolutionary Alliance, a group that had existed since before the FSLN and was led by Sandinista founder and former FSLN supreme commander Edén Pastora, a.k.a. "Commander Zero". Milpistas, former anti-Somoza rural militias, eventually formed the largest pool of recruits for the Contras. Although independent and often in conflict with each other, these guerrilla bands—along with several others—all became known as Contras (short for contrarrevolucionarios—counter-revolutionaries).

The opposition militias were initially organized and largely remained segregated according to regional affiliation and political backgrounds. They conducted attacks on economic, military, and civilian targets. During the Contra war, the Sandinistas arrested suspected members of the Contra militias and censored publications they accused of collaborating with the enemy, such as the U.S., the FDN, and ARDE.

==== State of Emergency (1982–1988) ====
In March 1982 the Sandinistas declared an official State of Emergency. They argued that this was a response to attacks by counter-revolutionary forces. The State of Emergency lasted six years, until January 1988, when it was lifted.

Under the new "Law for the Maintenance of Order and Public Security" the "Tribunales Populares Anti-Somocistas" allowed for the indefinite holding of suspected counter-revolutionaries without trial. The State of Emergency, however, most notably affected rights and guarantees contained in the "Statute on Rights and Guarantees of Nicaraguans". Many civil liberties were curtailed or canceled such as the freedom to organize demonstrations, the inviolability of the home, freedom of the press, freedom of speech, and the freedom to strike.

All independent news program broadcasts were suspended. In total, twenty-four programs were cancelled. In addition, Sandinista censor Nelba Cecilia Blandón issued a decree ordering all radio stations to take broadcasts from government radio station La Voz de La Defensa de La Patria every six hours.

The rights affected also included certain procedural guarantees in the case of detention including habeas corpus. The State of Emergency was not lifted during the 1984 elections. There were many instances where rallies of opposition parties were physically broken up by Sandinista Youth or pro-Sandinista mobs. Opponents to the State of Emergency argued its intent was to crush resistance to the FSLN. James Wheelock justified the actions of the Directorate by saying "... We are annulling the license of the false prophets and the oligarchs to attack the revolution."

Some emergency measures were taken before 1982. In December 1979 special courts called "Tribunales Especiales" were established to speed up the processing of 7,000-8,000 National Guard prisoners. These courts operated through relaxed rules of evidence and due process and were often staffed by law students and inexperienced lawyers. However, the decisions of the "Tribunales Especiales" were subject to appeal in regular courts. Many of the National Guard prisoners were released immediately due to lack of evidence. Others were pardoned or released by decree. By 1986 only 2,157 remained in custody and only 39 were still being held in 1989 when they were released under the Esquipulas II agreement.

On October 5, 1985, the Sandinistas broadened the 1982 State of Emergency and suspended many more civil rights. A new regulation also forced any organization outside of the government to first submit any statement it wanted to make public to the censorship bureau for prior approval.

The FSLN lost power in the presidential election of 1990 when Daniel Ortega was defeated in an election for the Presidency of Nicaragua by Violeta Chamorro.

=== Sandinistas vs. Contras ===
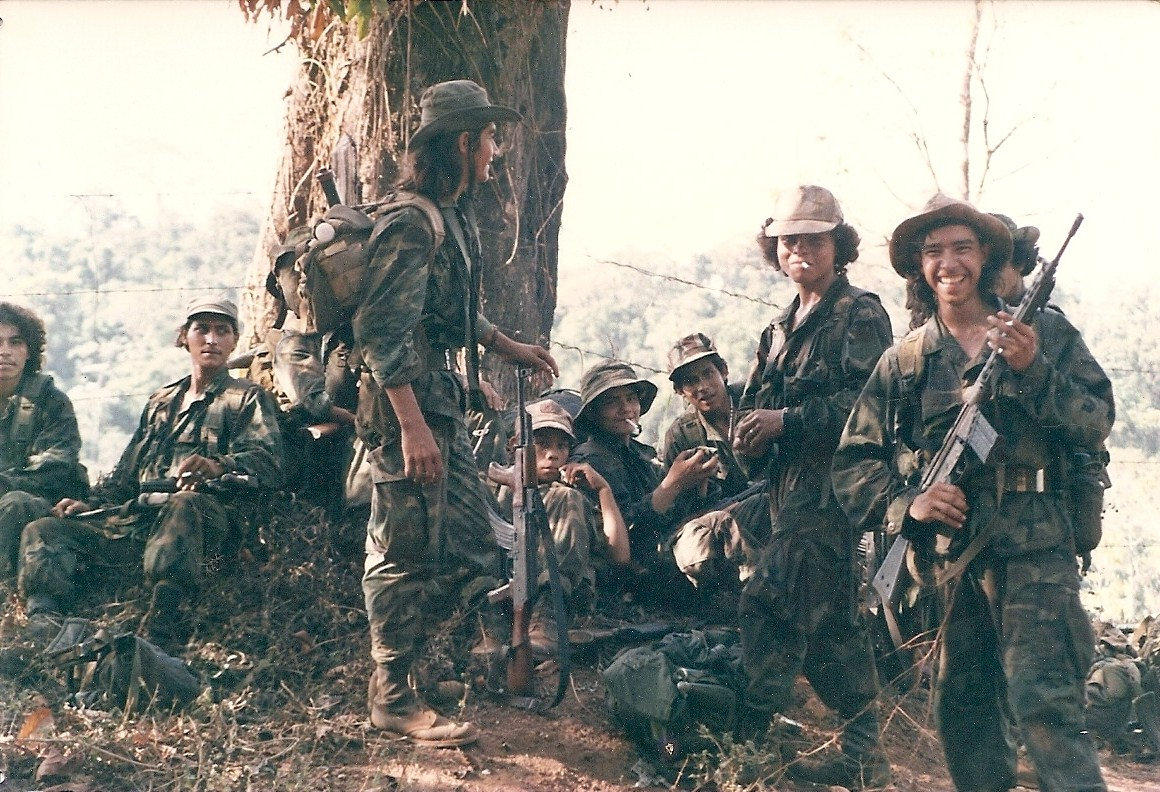
ARDE Frente Sur Contras in 1987

Upon assuming office in 1981, U.S. President Ronald Reagan condemned the FSLN for joining with Cuba in supporting "Marxist" revolutionary movements in other Latin American countries such as El Salvador. His administration authorized the CIA to begin financing, arming and training rebels, most of whom were the remnants of Somoza's National Guard, as anti-Sandinista guerrillas that were branded "counter-revolutionary" by leftists (contrarrevolucionarios in Spanish). This was shortened to Contras, a label the force chose to embrace. Edén Pastora and many of the indigenous guerrilla forces, who were not associated with the "Somocistas", also resisted the Sandinistas.

The Contras operated out of camps in the neighboring countries of Honduras to the north and Costa Rica (see Edén Pastora cited below) to the south. As was typical in guerrilla warfare, they were engaged in a campaign of economic sabotage in an attempt to combat the Sandinista government and disrupted shipping by planting underwater mines in Nicaragua's Corinto harbour, an action condemned by the International Court of Justice as illegal. The U.S. also sought to place economic pressure on the Sandinistas, and, as with Cuba, the Reagan administration imposed a full trade embargo.

The Contras also carried out a systematic campaign to disrupt the social reform programs of the government. This campaign included attacks on schools, health centers and the majority of the rural population that was sympathetic to the Sandinistas. Widespread murder, rape, and torture were also used as tools to destabilize the government and to "terrorize" the population into collaborating with the Contras. Throughout this campaign, the Contras received military and financial support from the CIA and the Reagan Administration. This campaign has been condemned internationally for its many human rights violations. Contra supporters have often tried to downplay these violations, or countered that the Sandinista government carried out much more. In particular, the Reagan administration engaged in a campaign to alter public opinion on the Contras that has been termed "white propaganda". In 1984, the International Court of Justice judged that the United States Government had been in violation of International law when it supported the Contras.

After the U.S. Congress prohibited federal funding of the Contras through the Boland Amendment in 1983, the Reagan administration continued to back the Contras by raising money from foreign allies and covertly selling arms to Iran (then engaged in a war with Iraq), and channelling the proceeds to the Contras (see the Iran–Contra affair). When this scheme was revealed, Reagan admitted that he knew about Iranian "arms for hostages" dealings but professed ignorance about the proceeds funding the Contras; for this, National Security Council aide Lt. Col. Oliver North took much of the blame.

Senator John Kerry's 1988 U.S. Senate Committee on Foreign Relations report on links between the Contras and drug imports to the US concluded that "senior U.S. policy makers were not immune to the idea that drug money was a perfect solution to the Contras' funding problems". According to the National Security Archive, Oliver North had been in contact with Manuel Noriega, the US-backed president of Panama. The Reagan administration's support for the Contras continued to stir controversy well into the 1990s. In August 1996, San Jose Mercury News reporter Gary Webb published a series titled Dark Alliance, linking the origins of crack cocaine in California to the CIA-Contra alliance. Webb's allegations were repudiated by reports from the Los Angeles Times, The New York Times, and The Washington Post, and the San Jose Mercury News eventually disavowed his work. An investigation by the United States Department of Justice also stated that their "review did not substantiate the main allegations stated and implied in the Mercury News articles". Regarding the specific charges towards the CIA, the DOJ wrote "the implication that the drug trafficking by the individuals discussed in the Mercury News articles was connected to the CIA was also not supported by the facts". The CIA also investigated and rejected the allegations.

The Contra war unfolded differently in the northern and southern zones of Nicaragua. Contras based in Costa Rica operated on Nicaragua's Caribbean coast, which is sparsely populated by indigenous groups including the Miskito, Sumo, Rama, Garifuna, and Mestizo. Unlike Spanish-speaking western Nicaragua, the Caribbean Coast also has lots of speakers of indigenous languages and English-based creoles, and was largely ignored by the Somoza regime. The costeños did not participate in the uprising against Somoza and viewed Sandinismo with suspicion from the outset.

=== Elections ===
==== 1984 election ====
While the Sandinistas encouraged grassroots pluralism, they were perhaps less enthusiastic about national elections. They argued that popular support was expressed in the insurrection and that further appeals to popular support would be a waste of scarce resources. International pressure and domestic opposition eventually pressed the government toward a national election. Tomás Borge warned that the elections were a concession, an act of generosity and of political necessity. On the other hand, the Sandinistas had little to fear from the election given the advantages of incumbency and the restrictions on the opposition, and they hoped to discredit the armed efforts to overthrow them.

A broad range of political parties, ranging in political orientation from far-left to far-right, competed for power. Following promulgation of a new populist constitution, Nicaragua held national elections in 1984. Independent electoral observers from around the world—including groups from the UN as well as observers from Western Europe—claimed that the elections had been fair. Several groups, however, disputed this, including UNO, a broad coalition of anti-Sandinista activists, COSEP, an organization of business leaders, the Contra group "FDN", organized by former Somozan-era National Guardsmen, landowners, businessmen, peasant highlanders, and what some claimed as their patron, the U.S. government.

Although initially willing to stand in the 1984 elections, the UNO, headed by Arturo Cruz (a former Sandinista), declined participation in the elections based on their own objections to the restrictions placed on the electoral process by the State of Emergency and the official advisement of President Ronald Reagan's State Department, who wanted to de-legitimize the election process. Among other parties that abstained was COSEP, who had warned the FSLN that they would decline participation unless freedom of the press was reinstituted. Coordinadora Democrática (CD) also refused to file candidates and urged Nicaraguans not to take part in the election. The Independent Liberal Party (PLI), headed by Virgilio Godoy Reyes, announced its refusal to participate in October. Consequently, when the elections went ahead the U.S. raised objections based upon political restrictions instituted by the State of Emergency (e.g., censorship of the press, cancellation of habeas corpus, and the curtailing of free assembly).

Daniel Ortega and Sergio Ramírez were elected president and vice-president, and the FSLN won an overwhelming 61 out of 96 seats in the new National Assembly, having taken 67% of the vote on a turnout of 75%. Despite international validation of the elections by multiple political and independent observers (virtually all from among U.S. allies), the United States refused to recognize the elections, with President Ronald Reagan denouncing the elections as a sham. Daniel Ortega began his six-year presidential term on January 10, 1985. After the United States Congress turned down continued funding of the Contras in April 1985, the Reagan administration ordered a total embargo on United States trade with Nicaragua the following month, accusing the Sandinista government of threatening United States security in the region.

==== 1990 election ====
The elections of 1990, which had been mandated by the constitution passed in 1987, saw the Bush administration funnel $49.75 million of 'non-lethal' aid to the Contras, as well as $9 million to the opposition UNO—equivalent to $2 billion worth of intervention by a foreign power in a US election at the time, and proportionately five times the amount George Bush had spent on his own election campaign. When Violeta Chamorro visited the White House in November 1989, the US pledged to maintain the embargo against Nicaragua unless Violeta Chamorro won.

There were reports of intimidation and violence during the election campaign by the contras, with a Canadian observer mission claiming that 42 people were killed by the contras in "election violence" in October 1989. Sandinistas were also accused of intimidation and violence during the election campaign. According to the Puebla Institute, by mid-December 1989, seven opposition leaders had been murdered, 12 had disappeared, 20 had been arrested, and 30 others assaulted. In late January 1990, the OAS observer team reported that "a convoy of troops attacked four truckloads of UNO sympathizers with bayonets and rifle butts, threatening to kill them."

Years of conflict had left 50,000 casualties and $12 billion of damages in a society of 3.5 million people and an annual GNP of $2 billion. After the election, a survey was taken of voters: 75.6% agreed that if the Sandinistas had won, the war would never have ended. 91.8% of those who voted for the UNO agreed with this (William I Robinson, op cit). The Library of Congress Country Studies on Nicaragua states:

Despite limited resources and poor organization, the UNO coalition under Violeta Chamorro directed a campaign centered around the failing economy and promises of peace. Many Nicaraguans expected the country's economic crisis to deepen and the Contra conflict to continue if the Sandinistas remained in power. Chamorro promised to end the unpopular military draft, bring about democratic reconciliation, and promote economic growth. In the February 25, 1990, elections, Violeta Barrios de Chamorro carried 55 percent of the popular vote against Daniel Ortega's 41 percent.

=== Opposition (1990–2006) ===
In 1987, due to a stalemate with the Contras, the Esquipulas II treaty was brokered by Costa Rican President Óscar Arias Sánchez. The treaty's provisions included a call for a cease-fire, freedom of expression, and national elections. After the February 26, 1990 elections, the Sandinistas lost and peacefully passed power to the National Opposition Union (UNO), an alliance of 14 opposition parties ranging from the conservative business organization COSEP to Nicaraguan communists. UNO's candidate, Violeta Barrios de Chamorro, replaced Daniel Ortega as president of Nicaragua.

Reasons for the Sandinista loss in 1990 are disputed. Defenders of the defeated government assert that Nicaraguans voted for the opposition due to the continuing U.S. economic embargo and potential Contra threat. Others have alleged that the United States threatened to continue to support the Contras and continue the civil war if the regime was not voted out of power.

After their loss, the Sandinista leaders held most of the private property and businesses that had been confiscated and nationalized by the FSLN government. This process became known as the "piñata" and was tolerated by the new Chamorro government. Ortega also claimed to "rule from below" through groups he controls such as labor unions and student groups.

Ortega remained the head of the FSLN, but his brother Humberto resigned from the party and remained at the head of the Sandinista Army, becoming a close confidante and supporter of Chamorro. The party also experienced internal divisions, with prominent Sandinistas such as Ernesto Cardenal and Sergio Ramírez resigning to protest what they described as heavy-handed domination of the party by Daniel Ortega. Ramírez also founded a separate political party, the Sandinista Renovation Movement (MRS); his faction came to be known as the renovistas, who favor a more social democratic approach than the ortodoxos, or hardliners. In the 1996 Nicaraguan election, Ortega and Ramírez both campaigned unsuccessfully as presidential candidates on behalf of their respective parties, with Ortega receiving 43% of the vote while Arnoldo Alemán of the Constitutional Liberal Party received 51%. The Sandinistas won second place in the congressional elections, with 36 of 93 seats.

Ortega was re-elected as leader of the FSLN in 1998. Municipal elections in November 2000 saw a strong Sandinista vote, especially in urban areas, and former Tourism Minister Herty Lewites was elected mayor of Managua. This result led to expectations of a close race in the presidential elections scheduled for November 2001. Daniel Ortega and Enrique Bolaños of the Constitutional Liberal Party (PLC) ran neck-and-neck in the polls for much of the campaign, but in the end the PLC won a clear victory. The results of these elections were that the FSLN won 42.6% of the vote for parliament (versus 52.6% for the PLC), giving them 41 out of the 92 seats in the National Assembly (versus 48 for the PLC). In the presidential race, Ortega lost to Bolaños 46.3% to 53.6%.

Daniel Ortega was once again re-elected as leader of the FSLN in March 2002 and re-elected as president of Nicaragua in November 2006.

=== Return to government ===
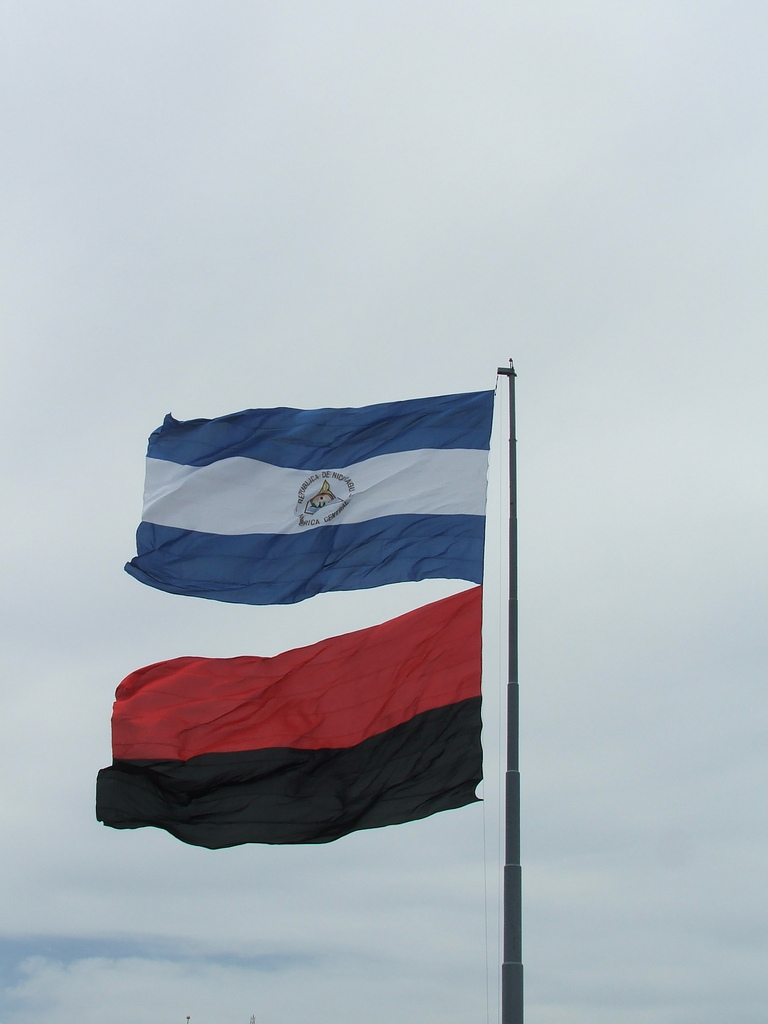
Flag of Nicaragua and the FSLN flown together

In 2006, Daniel Ortega was elected president with 38% of the vote (see 2006 Nicaraguan general election). This occurred despite the fact that the breakaway Sandinista Renovation Movement continued to oppose the FSLN, running former Mayor of Managua Herty Lewites as its candidate for president. However, Lewites died several months before the elections.

The FSLN also won 38 seats in the congressional elections, becoming the party with the largest representation in parliament. The split in the Constitutionalist Liberal Party helped to allow the FSLN to become the largest party in Congress. The Sandinista vote was also split between the FSLN and MRS, but the split was more uneven, with limited support for the MRS. The vote for the two liberal parties combined was larger than the vote for the two Sandinista parties. In 2010, several liberal congressmen raised accusations about the FSLN presumably attempting to buy votes in order to pass constitutional reforms that would allow Ortega to run for office for the 6th time since 1984. In 2011, Ortega was re-elected as president.

Ortega was allowed by Nicaraguan Supreme Court to run again as president, despite having already served two mandates, in a move which was strongly criticized by the opposition. The Supreme Court also banned the leader of the Independent Liberal Party Eduardo Montealegre from running in the election. Ortega was re-elected as president, amid claims of electoral fraud; data about turnout were unclear: while the Supreme Electoral Council claimed a turnout of 66% of voters, the opposition claimed only 30% of voters actually went to the polls.

==== 2018–20 protests ====
The year 2018 was marked by particular unrest in Nicaragua that had not been seen in the country in three decades. It came in two different phases, with initial unrest in the context of a fire at the Indio Maíz Biological Reserve in the Río San Juan department (which came to an end when rain abruptly put the fire out), leading on to an outbreak of violence a few weeks later after social security reforms were announced by the government.

During this unrest there were many deaths linked to the violence, as well as many instances of torture, sexual assaults, death threats, ransacking and burning of buildings and violence against journalists. Opposition figures argued that the government was responsible for the violence, a view supported by some press outlets and NGOs such as Amnesty International. Many opposition figures and independent journalists have been arrested and police raids of opposition forces and independent media have occurred frequently.

On September 29, 2018, President Ortega declared that the protests were illegal, stating that demonstrators would "respond to justice." The United Nations condemned the actions as being a violation of human rights regarding freedom of assembly.

Carlos Fernando Chamorro, son of former president Violeta Chamorro and editor of Confidencial, left the country after his office was subject to police search in December 2018.

In December 2018, the government revoked the licenses of five human rights organizations, closed the offices of the cable news and online show Confidencial, and beat journalists when they protested.

The Confidential newspaper and other media were seized and taken by the government of Daniel Ortega Several service stations of the Puma brand were closed on the afternoon, December 20, by representatives of the Nicaraguan Energy Institute (INE), a state entity that has the mandate to regulate, among others, the hydrocarbons sector. Puma Energy entered the Nicaraguan oil and fuel derivatives market at the end of March 2011, when it bought the entire network of Esso stations in Nicaragua, as part of a regional operation that involved the purchase of 290 service stations and eight storage terminals of fuel in four countries of Central America.

On December 21, 2018, the Nicaraguan police raided the offices of the 100% News Channel. They arrested Miguel Mora, owner of the Canal; Lucía Pineda, Head of Press of 100% Noticias and Verónica Chávez, wife of Miguel Mora and host of the Ellas Lo Dicen Program. Subsequently, Verónica Chávez was released. Miguel Mora and Lucia Pineda were accused of terrorist crimes and provoking hatred and discrimination between the police and Sandinistas.

On January 30, 2019, the FSLN was expelled from the Socialist International, which cited "gross violations of human rights and democratic values committed by the government of Nicaragua". The ruling Democratic Revolutionary Party of Panama, also a member of the Socialist International, rejected the expulsion of the FSLN and threatened to leave the International, saying that it has abandoned its principles and made a decision regarding Latin America without consulting the Latin American parties, and referred to a "history of brotherhood in the struggle for social justice in Central America" between the two parties.

== Ideology ==
Through the media and the works of FSLN leaders such as Carlos Fonseca, the life and times of Augusto César Sandino became its unique symbol in Nicaragua. The ideology of Sandinismo gained momentum in 1974, when a Sandinista-initiated hostage situation resulted in the Somoza government adhering to FSLN demands and publicly printing and airing work on Sandino in well known newspapers and media outlets.

During the struggle against Somoza, the FSLN leaders' internal disagreements over strategy and tactics were reflected in three main factions:

- The guerra popular prolongada (GPP, "protracted people's war") faction was rural-based and sought long-term "silent accumulation of forces" within the country's large peasant population, which it saw as the main social base for the revolution.
- The tendencia proletaria (TP, "proletarian tendency"), led by Jaime Wheelock, reflected an orthodox Marxist approach that sought to organize urban workers.
- The tercerista/insurreccionista (TI, "third way/insurrectionist") faction, led by Humberto, Casimiro A. Sotelo, and Daniel Ortega, was ideologically eclectic, favoring a more rapid insurrectional strategy in alliance with diverse sectors of the country, including business owners, churches, students, the middle class, unemployed youth and the inhabitants of shantytowns. The terceristas also helped attract popular and international support by organizing a group of prominent Nicaraguan professionals, business leaders, and clergymen (known as "the Twelve"), who called for Somoza's removal and sought to organize a provisional government from Costa Rica.

Nevertheless, while ideologies varied between FSLN leaders, all leaders essentially agreed that Sandino provided a path for the Nicaragua masses to take charge, and the FSLN would act as the legitimate vanguard. The extreme end of the ideology links Sandino to Roman Catholicism and portrays him as descending from the mountains in Nicaragua knowing he would be betrayed and killed. Generally however, most Sandinistas associated Sandino on a more practical level, as a heroic and honest person who tried to combat the evil forces of imperialist national and international governments that existed in Nicaragua's history.

Political scientist Kai M. Thaler wrote that Sandinismo is a left-wing ideology that combines "Marxism–Leninism, Liberation Theology, and anti-imperialist nationalism". FSLN itself declared that "Sandinismo is the application of Marxism-Leninism to the Nicaraguan reality"; at the same time, FSLN is not a classic Marxist-Leninist party such as the ruling parties of Cuba, Soviet Union, or China. Instead, the Sandinista Marxism-Leninism is combined with Christianity and nationalism, and all three coexist as political currents present in the Sandinista thought. Most importantly, Sandinismo rejects the anti-religious reading of Marxism, instead insisting "that Marxism and Christianity are fully compatible."

An important part of the Sandinista ideology is Christian socialism and liberation theology. This connection was so strong that Catholic priest Ernesto Cardenal who served as the Minister of Culture in the Sandinista government, remarked: "I think Nicaraguans who separate Christianity from Revolution are mistaken. Here they are the same thing." In response to the growing radicalization and opposition to Somoza amongst the Church, the FSLN incorporated a Catholic message into its program; this was augmented by left-wing Catholic organizations such as the Movimiento Cristiano Revolucionario joining the FSLN, whose members would assume high responsibilities within the Sandinista government. Sandinista activists infiltrated folk and religious imagery - on one such instance, they distributed paintings of the resurrection of Christ, where Christ appeared in a black and red cape (Sandinista colours), which bore the letters FSLN. As the FSLN lacked party structures which could be used for organizing, they relied on friendly clergymen instead; according to Peter Marchetti, this relationship became so intimate that "the parish replaced Lenin's idea of a cell". Sandinista Minister of Education Carlos Tünnerman argued that Sandinismo "is deeply rooted in Christianity" and "came about through a process of Christian self-reflection".

As Sandinistas relied on churches to build their structures, their ideological relationship to Catholicism was not just based on mutual support, but on active incorporation of Political Catholicism. Sandinista musician Carlos Mejía Godoy composed "Misa Campesina Nicaraguense" (Nicaraguan peasant mass) which replaced the traditional mass in Nicaraguan churches, with Catholic hymns praising "worker Christ". The FSLN provided churches with decals of Virgin Mary and Catholic saints next to portraits of Augusto Sandino, Che Guevara and Camilo Torres Restrepo. Sandinistas openly promoted the Catholic concept of "preferential option for the poor", and the Secretary-General of FSLN Carlos Fonseca remarked: "Since I began working with the Sandinista Front I have never—never! at any moment met anything which contradicts my Christian faith, nor which clashes with my Christian morality. Never. Just the opposite. For me the Sandinista Front has been the channel that has enabled me to live my Christian faith more authentically, that is, with actions." Sandinismo offered a blend of the Marxist notion of class struggle and liberation theology, presenting their ideology as an 'extension' of Catholicism. Tomás Borge argued that the Sandinista revolution "was on behalf of all human beings, but as with Christ above all for the poor."

Despite the left-wing revolutionary rhetoric of the party, critics allege Ortega has more recently allied with the business class and enacted what critical scholars characterize as crony capitalism.

== Principles of government ==
For purposes of making sense of how to govern, the FSLN drew four fundamental principles from the work of Carlos Fonseca and his understanding of the lessons of Sandino. According to Bruce E. Wright, "the Governing Junta of National Reconstruction agreed, under Sandinista leadership, that these principles had guided it in putting into practice a form of government that was characterized by those principles." It is generally accepted that these following principles have evolved the "ideology of Sandinismo". Three of these (excluding popular participation, which was presumably contained in Article 2 of the Constitution of Nicaragua) were to ultimately be guaranteed by Article 5 of the Constitution of Nicaragua. They are as follows:

1. Political Pluralism – The ultimate success of the Sandinista Front in guiding the insurrection and in obtaining the leading fore within it was based on the fact that the FSLN, through the tercerista guidance, had worked with many sectors of the population in defeating the Somoza dictatorship. The FSLN and all those who would constitute the new provisional government were called diverse; "they were plural in virtually all senses".
2. Mixed Economy – Fonseca's understanding that Nicaragua was not, in spite of Browderist interpretations, simply a feudal country and that it had also never really developed its own capitalism made it clear that a simple feudalism-capitalism-socialism path was not a rational way to think about the future development of Nicaragua. The FSLN was not necessarily seen simply as the vanguard of the proletariat revolution. The proletariat was but a minor fraction of the population. A complex class structure in a revolution based on unity among people from various class positions suggested more that it made sense to see the FSLN as the "vanguard of the people".
3. Popular Participation and Mobilization – This calls for more than simple representative democracy. The inclusion of the mass organizations in the Council of State clearly manifested this conception. In Article 2 of the Constitution this is spelled out as follows: "The people exercise democracy, freely participating and deciding in the construction of the economic, political and social system what is most appropriate to their interest. The people exercise power directly and by their means of their representatives, freely elected in accord with universal, equal, direct, free, and secret suffrage."
4. International Non-alignment – This is a result of the fundamentally Bolivarist conceptions of Sandino as distilled through the modern understanding of Fonseca. The U.S. government and large U.S. economic entities were a significant part of the problem for Nicaragua. But experiences with the traditional parties allied with the Soviet Union had also been unsatisfactory. Thus it was clear that Nicaragua must seek its own road.

Bruce E. Wright claims that "this was a crucial contribution from Fonseca's work that set the template for FSLN governance during the revolutionary years and beyond".

== Policies and programs ==
=== Foreign policy ===
==== Cuban assistance ====
Beginning in 1967, the Cuban General Intelligence Directorate, or DGI, had begun to establish ties with Nicaraguan revolutionary organizations. By 1970 the DGI had managed to train hundreds of Sandinista guerrilla leaders and had vast influence over the organization. After the successful ousting of Somoza, DGI involvement in the new Sandinista government expanded rapidly. An early indication of the central role that the DGI would play in the Cuban-Nicaraguan relationship is a meeting in Havana on July 27, 1979, at which diplomatic ties between the two countries were re-established after more than 25 years. Julián López Díaz, a prominent DGI agent, was named Ambassador to Nicaragua. Cuban military and DGI advisors, initially brought in during the Sandinista insurgency, would swell to over 2,500 and operated at all levels of the new Nicaraguan government.

The Cubans would like to have helped more in the development of Nicaragua towards socialism. Following the US invasion of Grenada, countries previously looking for support from Cuba saw that the United States was likely to take violent action to discourage this.

===== Cuban assistance after the revolution =====
The early years of the Nicaraguan revolution had strong ties to Cuba. The Sandinista leaders acknowledged that the FSLN owed a great debt to the socialist island. Once the Sandinistas assumed power, Cuba gave Nicaragua military advice, as well as aid in education, health care, vocational training and industry building for the impoverished Nicaraguan economy. In return, Nicaragua provided Cuba with grains and other foodstuffs to help Cuba overcome the effects of the US embargo.

==== Relationship with eastern bloc intelligence agencies ====
===== Pre-Revolution =====
According to Cambridge University historian Christopher Andrew, who undertook the task of processing the Mitrokhin Archive, Carlos Fonseca Amador, one of the original three founding members of the FSLN had been recruited by the KGB in 1959 while on a trip to Moscow. This was one part of Aleksandr Shelepin's 'grand strategy' of using national liberation movements as a spearhead of the Soviet Union's foreign policy in the Third World, and in 1960 the KGB organized funding and training for twelve individuals that Fonseca handpicked. These individuals were to be the core of the new Sandinista organization. In the following several years, the FSLN tried with little success to organize guerrilla warfare against the government of Luis Somoza Debayle. After several failed attempts to attack government strongholds and little initial support from the local population, the National Guard nearly annihilated the Sandinistas in a series of attacks in 1963. Disappointed with the performance of Shelepin's new Latin American "revolutionary vanguard", the KGB reconstituted its core of the Sandinista leadership into the ISKRA group and used them for other activities in Latin America.

According to Andrew, Mitrokhin says during the following three years the KGB handpicked several dozen Sandinistas for intelligence and sabotage operations in the United States. Andrew and Mitrokhin say that in 1966, this KGB-controlled Sandinista sabotage and intelligence group was sent to northern Mexico near the US border to conduct surveillance for possible sabotage.

In July 1961 during the Berlin Crisis of 1961 KGB chief Alexander Shelepin sent a memorandum to Soviet premier Nikita Khrushchev containing proposals to create a situation in various areas of the world which would favor dispersion of attention and forces by the US and their satellites, and would tie them down during the settlement of the question of a German peace treaty and West Berlin. It was planned, inter alia, to organize an armed mutiny in Nicaragua in coordination with Cuba and with the "Revolutionary Front Sandino". Shelepin proposed to make appropriations from KGB funds in addition to the previous assistance $10,000 for purchase of arms.

Khrushchev sent the memo with his approval to his deputy Frol Kozlov and on August 1 it was, with minor revisions, passed as a CPSU Central Committee directive. The KGB and the Soviet Ministry of Defense were instructed to work out more specific measures and present them for consideration by the Central Committee.

===== Cooperation with foreign intelligence agencies during the 1980s =====
Other researchers have documented the contribution made from other Warsaw Pact intelligence agencies to the fledgling Sandinista government including the East German Stasi, by using recently declassified documents from Berlin as well as from former Stasi spymaster Markus Wolf who described the Stasi's assistance in the creation of a secret police force modeled on East Germany's.

=== Educational assistance ===
Cuba was instrumental in the Nicaraguan Literacy Campaign. Nicaragua was a country with a very high rate of illiteracy, but the campaign succeeded in lowering the rate from 50% to 12%. The revolution in Cuban education since the ousting of the US-backed Batista regime not only served as a model for Nicaragua but also provided technical assistance and advice. Cuba played an important part in the Campaign, providing teachers on a yearly basis after the revolution. Prevost states that "Teachers were not the only ones studying in Cuba, about 2,000 primary and secondary students were studying on the Isle of Youth and the cost was covered by the host country (Cuba)".

==== 1980 literacy campaign ====
1979 FSLN poster reading: "Consolidate the Revolution in the rearguard and with literacy" (Spanish: A consolidar la Revolución en la Retaguardia y la Alfabetización)

The goals of the 1980 Literacy Campaign were socio-political, strategic as well as educational. It was the most prominent campaign with regards to the new education system. Illiteracy in Nicaragua was reduced, and it has been claimed that overall illiteracy went down from 50% to 13%, although this figure has been called into question. One of the government's major concerns was the previous education system under the Somoza regime which did not see education as a major factor on the development of the country. As mentioned in the Historical Program of the FSLN of 1969, education was seen as a right and the pressure to stay committed to the promises made in the program was even stronger. 1980 was declared the "Year of Literacy" and the major goals of the campaign that started only 8 months after the FSLN took over. This included the eradication of illiteracy and the integration of different classes, races, gender and age. Political awareness and the strengthening of political and economic participation of the Nicaraguan people was also a central goal of the Literacy Campaign. The campaign was a key component of the FSLN's cultural transformation agenda.

The basic reader which was disseminated and used by teacher was called "Dawn of the People" based on the themes of Sandino, Carlos Fonseca, and the Sandinista struggle against imperialism and defending the revolution. Political education was aimed at creating a new social values based on the principles of Sandinista socialism, such as social solidarity, worker's democracy, egalitarianism, and anti-imperialism.

=== Health care ===
Health conditions in Somoza era Nicaragua were abysmal according to a report published in the New England Journal of Medicine. Vaccine coverage of babies under a year old was 88% immunised against polio and 78% against measles in 1983. Despite the turmoil caused by the Contra War under-fire mortality was reduced by approximately half during this period.

In this area Cuba played a role by again offering expertise to Nicaragua. Over 1,500 Cuban doctors worked in Nicaragua and provided more than five million consultations. Cuban personnel were essential in the elimination of polio, the decrease in whooping cough, rubella, measles and the lowering of the infant mortality rate. Gary Prevost states that Cuban personnel made it possible for Nicaragua to have a national health care system that reached the majority of its citizens.

=== Vocational assistance ===
Cuba has participated in the training of Nicaraguan workers in the use of new machinery imported to Nicaragua. The Nicaraguan revolution caused the United States to oppose the country's government; therefore the Sandinistas would not receive any aid from the United States. The United States embargo against Nicaragua, imposed by the Reagan administration in May 1985, made it impossible for Nicaragua to receive spare parts for US-made machines, so this led Nicaragua to look to other countries for help. Cuba was the best choice because of the shared language and proximity and also because it had imported similar machinery over the years. Nicaraguans went to Cuba for short periods of three to six months and this training involved close to 3,000 workers. Countries such as the UK, sent farm equipment to Nicaragua.

=== Industry and infrastructure ===
Cuba helped Nicaragua in large projects such as building roads, power plants and sugar mills. Cuba also attempted to help Nicaragua build the first overland route linking Nicaragua's Atlantic and Pacific coasts. The road was meant to traverse 420 kilometres (260 mi) of jungle, but completion of the road and usage was hindered by the Contra war, and it was never completed.

Another significant feat was the building of the Tipitapa-Malacatoya sugar mill. It was completed and inaugurated during a visit by Fidel Castro in January 1985. The plant used the newest technology available and was built by workers trained in Cuba. Also during this visit Castro announced that all debts incurred on this project were absolved. Cuba provided assistance in the rejuvenation of different industries - such as the sugar industry and livestock breeding. Aid was provided through training from technicians, technology, spare parts, as well as building schools and similar projects.

=== Ministry of Culture ===
After the Nicaraguan revolution, the Sandinista government established a Ministry of Culture in 1980. The ministry was spearheaded by Ernesto Cardenal, a poet and priest. The ministry was established in order to socialize the modes of cultural production. This extended to art forms including dance, music, art, theatre and poetry. The project was created to democratize culture on a national level. The aim of the ministry was to "democratize art" by making it accessible to all social classes as well as protecting the right of the oppressed to produce, distribute and receive art. In particular, the ministry was devoted to the development of working class and campesino, or peasant culture. Therefore, the ministry sponsored cultural workshops throughout the country until October 1988 when the Ministry of Culture was integrated into the Ministry of Education because of financial troubles.

The objective of the workshops was to recognize and celebrate neglected forms of artistic expression. The ministry created a program of cultural workshops known as Casas de Cultura and Centros Populares de Cultura. The workshops were set up in poor neighbourhoods and rural areas and advocated universal access and consumption of art in Nicaragua. The ministry assisted in the creation of theatre groups, folklore and artisanal production, song groups, new journals of creation and cultural criticism, and training programs for cultural workers. The ministry created a Sandinista daily newspaper named Barricada and its weekly cultural addition named Ventana along with the Television Sandino, Radio Sandino and the Nicaraguan film production unit called the INCINE. There were existing papers which splintered after the revolution and produced other independent, pro-Sandinista newspapers, such as El Nuevo Diario and its literary addition Nuevo Amanecer Cultural. Editorial Nueva Nicaragua, a state publishing house for literature, was also created. The ministry collected and published political poetry of the revolutionary period, known as testimonial narrative, a form of literary genre that recorded the experiences of individuals in the course of the revolution.

The ministry developed a new anthology of Rubén Darío, a Nicaraguan poet and writer, established a Rubén Darío prize for Latin American writers, the Leonel Rugama prize for young Nicaraguan writers, as well as public poetry readings and contests, cultural festivals and concerts. The Sandinista regime tried to keep the revolutionary spirit alive by empowering its citizens artistically. At the time of its inception, the Ministry of Culture needed, according to Cardenal, "to bring a culture to the people who were marginalized from it. We want a culture that is not the culture of an elite, of a group that is considered 'cultivated', but rather of an entire people." Nevertheless, the success of the Ministry of Culture had mixed results and by 1985 criticism arose over artistic freedom in the poetry workshops. The poetry workshops became a matter for criticism and debate. Critics argued that the ministry imposed too many principles and guidelines for young writers in the workshop, such as, asking them to avoid metaphors in their poetry and advising them to write about events in their everyday life. Critical voices came from established poets and writers represented by the Asociacion Sandinista de Trabajadores de la Cultura (ASTC) and from the Ventana both of which were headed by Rosario Murillo. They argued that young writers should be exposed to different poetic styles of writing and resources developed in Nicaragua and elsewhere. Furthermore, they argued that the ministry exhibited a tendency that favored and fostered political and testimonial literature in post-revolutionary Nicaragua.

=== Economy ===
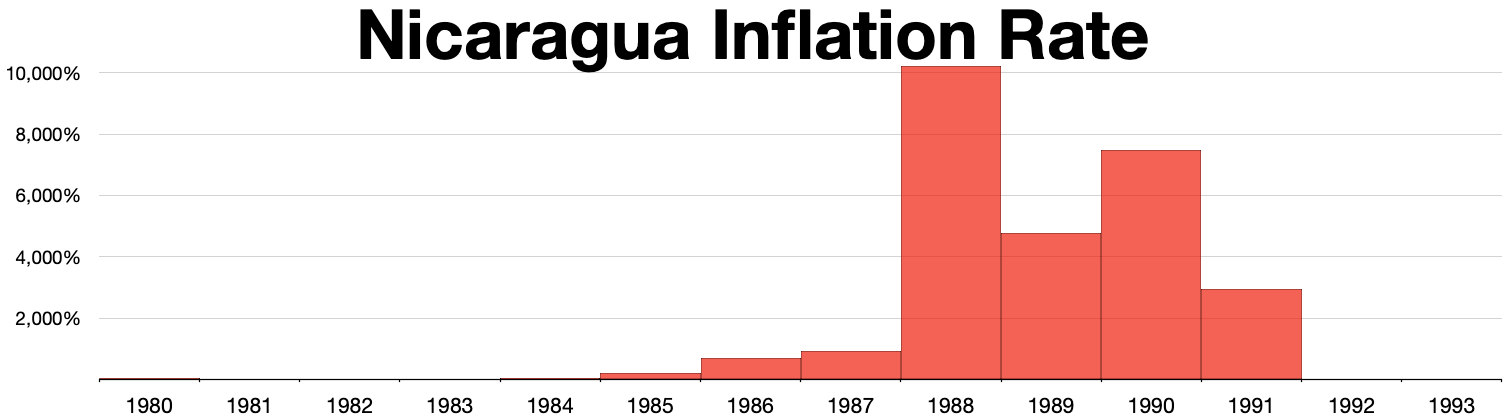
Nicaragua inflation rate (1980–1993)

The new government, formed in 1979 and dominated by the Sandinistas, resulted in a socialist model of economic development. The new leadership was conscious of the social inequities produced during the previous thirty years of unrestricted economic growth and was determined to make the country's workers and peasants, the "economically underprivileged", the prime beneficiaries of the new society. Consequently, in 1980 and 1981, unbridled incentives to private investment gave way to institutions designed to redistribute wealth and income. Private property would continue to be allowed, but all land belonging to the Somozas was confiscated. By 1990 the agrarian reform had affected half of the country's arable land benefiting some 60% of rural families.

However, the ideology of the Sandinistas put the future of the private sector and of private ownership of the means of production in doubt. Although under the new government both public and private ownership were accepted, government spokespersons occasionally referred to a reconstruction phase in the country's development, in which property owners and the professional class would be tapped for their managerial and technical expertise. After reconstruction and recovery, the private sector would give way to expanded public ownership in most areas of the economy. Despite such ideas, which represented the point of view of a faction of the government, the Sandinista government remained officially committed to a mixed economy.

The Sandinista government also significantly expanded workers rights in particular the right to form a union and collective bargaining. Some trade union rights however, like the right to strike were suspended during the Contra War, but strikes still occurred throughout the 1980s, most labour strikes were settled through dialogue with the FSLN.

Economic growth was uneven in the 1980s. Restructuring of the economy and the rebuilding immediately following the end of the civil war caused the GDP to rise about 5 percent in 1980 and 1981. Each year from 1984 to 1990, however, showed a drop in the GDP. Reasons for the contraction included the reluctance of foreign banks to offer new loans, the diversion of funds to fight the new insurrection against the government, and, after 1985, the total embargo on trade with the United States, formerly Nicaragua's largest trading partner. After 1985 the government chose to fill the gap between decreasing revenues and mushrooming military expenditures by printing large amounts of paper money. Inflation rose rapidly, peaking in 1988 at more than 14,000 percent annually.

Measures taken by the government to lower inflation were hampered by natural disaster. In early 1988, the administration of Daniel José Ortega Saavedra (Sandinista junta coordinator 1979–85, president 1985–90) established an austerity program to lower inflation. Price controls were tightened, and a new currency was introduced. As a result, by August 1988, inflation had dropped to an annual rate of 240 percent. The following month, however, Hurricane Joan cut a path directly across the center of the country. Damage was extensive, and the government's program of large spending to repair the infrastructure destroyed its anti-inflation measures.

In its eleven years in power, the Sandinista government never overcame most of the economic inequalities that it inherited from the Somoza era. Years of war, policy missteps, natural disasters, and the effects of the United States trade embargo all hindered economic development. Despite these problems however, the Nicaragua economy saw a transformation in a direction to satisfy the needs of Nicaragua's poor majority.

== Women in revolutionary Nicaragua ==
The women of Nicaragua prior to, during and after the revolution played a prominent role within the nation's society as they have commonly been recognized, throughout history and across all Latin American states, as its backbone. Nicaraguan women were therefore directly affected by all of the positive and negative events that took place during this revolutionary period. The victory of the Sandinista National Liberation Front (FSLN) in 1979 brought about major changes and gains for women, mainly in legislation, broad educational opportunities, training programs for working women, childcare programs to help women enter the work force and greatly increased participation and leadership positions in a range of political activities. This, in turn, reduced the burdens that the women of Nicaragua were faced with prior to the revolution. During the Sandinista government, women were more active politically. The large majority of members of the neighborhood committees (Comités de Defensa Sandinista) were women. By 1987, 31% of the executive positions in the Sandinista government, 27% of the leadership positions of the FSLN, and 25% of the FSLN's active membership were women.

Supporters of the Sandinistas see their era as characterized by the creation and implementation of successful social programs which were free and made widely available to the entire nation. Some of the more successful programs for women that were implemented by the Sandinistas were in the areas of education (see: Nicaraguan Literacy Campaign), health, and housing. Providing subsidies for basic foodstuffs and the introduction of mass employment were also contributions of the FSLN. The Sandinistas were particularly advantageous for the women of Nicaraguan as they promoted progressive views on gender as early as 1969 claiming that the revolution would "abolish the detestable discrimination that women have suffered with regard to men and establish economic, political and cultural equality between men and women". This was evident as the FSLN began integrating women into their ranks by 1967, unlike other left-wing guerilla groups in the region. This goal was not fully reached because the roots of gender inequality were not explicitly challenged. Women's participation within the public sphere was also substantial, as many took part in the armed struggle as part of the FSLN or as part of counter-revolutionary forces.

Nicaraguan women organized independently in support of the revolution and their cause, such as Las Mujeres del Cuá, of which Petrona Hernández López was a well known member. Some of the organizations were the Socialist Party (1963), Federación Democrática (which support the FSLN in rural areas), and Luisa Amanda Espinoza Association of Nicaraguan Women (Asociación de Mujeres Nicaragüenses Luisa Amanda Espinosa, AMNLAE). However, since Daniel Ortega, was defeated in the 1990 election by the United Nicaraguan Opposition (UNO) coalition headed by Violeta Chamorro, the situation for women in Nicaragua was seriously altered. In terms of women and the labor market, by the end of 1991 AMNLAE reported that almost 16,000 working women—9,000 agricultural laborers, 3,000 industrial workers, and 3,800 civil servants, including 2,000 in health, 800 in education, and 1,000 in administration—had lost their jobs. The change in government also resulted in the drastic reduction or suspension of all Nicaraguan social programs, which brought back the burdens characteristic of pre-revolutionary Nicaragua. The women were forced to maintain and supplement community social services on their own without economic aid or technical and human resource.

Between 2007 and 2018 under Sandinista administrations, Nicaragua has advanced from 62nd to 6th in the world in terms of gender equality, according to the Global Gender Gap Report from the World Economic Forum.

== Relationship with the Catholic Church ==
The Catholic Church's relationship with the Sandinistas was extremely complex. Initially, the Church was supportive of the Somoza regime as it broke with the liberal tradition of anti-clericalism. Anti-clerical laws of the Estado Liberal established by the Liberal Party of Nicaragua were repealed, and Somoza granted the Church tax exemptions and assigned it a central role in state education, allowing Catholic, state-funded schools to flourish. However, relations with the Catholic clergy gradually deteriorated as the regime grew more oppressive and Somoza committed atrocities against his political opponents with help of Guardia Nacional. Open conflict between the Church and the regime emerged in the wake of Vatican II.

Vatican II had a profound effect on the Catholic Church, leading to the beginning of liberation theology, Catholic-Marxist dialogue, and empowering already existing left-wing currents within the Catholic clergy such as the worker-priests. Many Nicagaruan priests would join this trend and radicalize their parishioners into either supporting or even joining the Sandinistas. Priest Ernesto Cardenal encouraged his parishioners to reflect on their living conditions in relation to the religious message; in his teachings, Cardenal concluded that the realization of the Gospel would be taking up arms against the Somoza regime to oppose "un-Christian" conditions. Cardenal's brand of revolutionary Catholicism attracted the local working class, allowing the FSLN to successfully recruit them. Eventually the Sandinistas managed to recruit Cardenal himself, turning his local church into a potent source of new recruits. Cardenal was even reported to have said that "Jesus Christ is the Sandinistas" during Mass. Other priests such as José de la Jara promoted a sense of Catholic community in poor squatter neighbourhoods, promoting the portrayal of Jesus Christ as a poor worker in image of local inhabitants, and instituted a number of Catholic programs to help the community, such as road repairs, literacy programs and founded the Christian Youth Movement. Such actions united hitherto dispersed communities and fostered mutual support and trust. When encouraged by local priests to consider struggling for better living conditions as the realization of Catholic social teachings, parishioners spoke out forcefully against poor living conditions and unaffordable prices, eventually turning their discontent into open support for the FSLN. Even the priests who did not join the revolution would turn their churches into safe houses for the insurrectionists, gathering food and medicine for Sandinista combatants.

At its core, liberation theology recognized class struggle as a part of the Latin American society that was inherited from colonialism, and that is continued under capitalism which was considered neo-colonialism. For revolutionary Catholics, imperialism and capitalism became sin in themselves, and Jesus Christ was interpreted in context of being a revolutionary. Left-wing Nicaraguan priests replaced the traditional imagery of 'New Jerusalem' with 'New Havana', and argued for the necessity of embracing the option for the poor and committing oneself to Marxist revolution in order to be a 'true Catholic'. Supporters of liberation theology also agreed in principle with Marxist economics, with liberation theology priests such as Gustavo Gutiérrez stating that a classless society where private ownership of production is prohibited, is the only acceptable Catholic response. The FSLN openly courted the growing following of revolutionary Catholics, portraying their revolutionary struggle against the Somoza regime as a realization of the Catholic social teaching. While the Catholic upper hierarchy was first reluctant to join the Sandinista revolution, it gradually moved to legitimatize its revolutionary goals and openly embraced it following the Second Episcopal Conference of Latin America, which openly called for challenging oppressive regimes in the region. The Church's hostility towards Somoza became even more apparent in 1970 with the appointment of Archbishop Miguel Obando y Bravo. When given a Mercedes Benz as a goodwill gift by Somoza, Bravo sold it and distributed the money among the poor. During the revolution, the Catholic Church's relationship with the Sandinistas grew so close that even sacraments acquired a revolutionary meaning - one priest reportedly baptized a newborn girl by saying: "Let all selfishness, capitalism, Somozism, go out of this little girl." Numerous Christian base communities (CEBs) were created in which lower level clergy and laity took part in consciousness raising initiatives to educate the peasants about the institutionalized violence they were suffering from. Some priests took a more active role in supporting the revolutionary struggle. For example, Father Gaspar García Laviana took up arms and became a member of FSLN.

After the establishment of the Sandinista regime, the Catholic Church was jubilant, which could be observed in the November 1979 pastoral letter "Christian Commitment for a New Nicaragua" which was described as "warm, encouraging, confident, and supportive of the FSLN-led revolution." Nicaraguan bishops stated that they are "confident that the revolutionary process will be something creative, profoundly original, and in no way imitative." Full of praise for the new revolutionary government, the clergy promised to assist the new regime, "even in the construction of a socialist society." However, the new government alienated the Church by what was perceived as a gradual removal of the Church's role in education; the government was accused of introducing a purely secular model of education following the example of the Cuban government, even inviting Cuban teachers to assist the process. Conservative media attacked the government for promoting "materialist ideology" in schools and warning of looming Marxist and atheist infiltration of the state education. By 1982, the controversy over education became so polarizing that some members of the governing junta such as Violeta Chamorro and Alfonso Robelo resigned, arguing that new laws are unconstitutional. Analyzing the conflict, John M. Kirk concluded: "For their part, the Sandinistas can be criticized for their lack of sensitivity to the hierarchy's concerns — for it should have been obvious that education had long been regarded as the bailiwick of Church leaders. This political insensitivity of the FSLN — particularly among the middle-level cadres—exacerbated the increasingly problematic relationship between the FSLN and the Church hierarchy."

Conservative Catholic priests and journalists attacked the new regime, with Humberto Belli claiming that the FSLN was trying to appropriate Catholic symbols. Examples of their attempts to "infiltrate" the Church was the presence of Sandinista leaders at religious ceremonies, supporting socialist-aligned Catholic institutions such as the Instituto Histérico Centro-Americano which published pamphlets that depicted Jesus Christ superimposed on the image of a guerrilla fighter, encouraging Catholics to participate in the "revolutionary process", and discussing "martyrs" of the revolutionary struggle. The Episcopal Conference of Latin America (CELAM) warned in 1981 that "Nicaragua is heading for atheism, and that the Sandinista Front was already suppressing Christmas and the feast of the Immaculate Conception." However, when Spanish priest Teófilo Cabestrero travelled to Revolutionary Nicaragua to investigate the situation, he found that Catholic celebrations were not suppressed at all, but rather encouraged and openly celebrated by the Sandinistas themselves - festivities were held in government ministries, commercialization of the religious feast was prohibited, and a national holiday for all major Catholic feasts were proclaimed. Cabastrero concluded: "This revolution is not prohibiting or curbing religious activities, but rather is offering the churches a unique opportunity to re-evangelize themselves, and to evangelize the entire population with new evangelical vigor." He also added: "For the present, the danger for religion and the Church is not with the Sandinista people's revolution, but rather is in the utilization of religion and the Church against the people's revolution".

Phillip Berryman concludes that the growing tension between the Sandinistas and the Catholic Church was a result of constant misinterpretations and misunderstanding between both sides, combined with interference of foreign conservative clergymen. He concludes that CELAM did not intend to attack the revolutionary government but rather as an attempt to "spiritualize religion and support the moral authority of the bishops." John M. Kirk shares Berryman's conclusion, arguing that the emerging rift between the Church and state was a result of "powerful international organizations stepping in to shore up an increasingly conservative hierarchy and at the same time cast aspersions on the progressive wing of the Church, which favored the government reforms." Mounting tensions were followed by the attempts of the Sandinista government to silence bishops perceived as problematic - in July 1981 the government cancelled the weekly televised broadcast of mass by archbishop Obando y Bravo after he denied the government's request to share the spot with progressive, government-aligned priests. The government also shut down the Church-run media such as the Radio Católica radio station, and in 1982 the government banned the publication of a letter from Pope John Paul II which called for ordinary priests to support and obey their bishops. FSLN also fostered a "popular church" by using its connections to progressive clergy established during the revolution, effectively developing a 'popular church' that became a parallel structure to the institutional church. Sandinistas advertised this move as a part of their liberation theology, which postulated moving the Church out of the hands of the vilified higher hierarchy and into the hands of lower-ranking priests who were part of the working class and knew their struggle. Geraldine O'Leary de Macias commented on this situation:

The FSLN continues to cultivate the base Christian communities and call them "the good Christians". But the FSLN has turned against Archbishop Obando, calling him an anti-Christ, because he has challenged their human rights violations and their systematic elimination of the political opposition.

— Jacobson, R. S. (1986). "Liberation Theology as a Revolutionary Ideology in Latin America". The Fletcher Forum, 10(2), 332

The Sandinistas' relationship with the Church deteriorated as the Contra War continued. The hierarchy refused to speak out against the counterrevolutionary activities of the contras and failed to denounce American military aid. State media accused the Church of being reactionary and supporting the Contras. According to former President Ortega, "The conflict with the church was strong, and it costs us, but I don't think it was our fault. ... There were so many people being wounded every day, so many people dying, and it was hard for us to understand the position of the church hierarchy in refusing to condemn the contras." The hierarchy-state tensions were brought to the fore with Pope John Paul II 1983 visit to Nicaragua. Hostility to the Church became so great that at one point, FSLN militants shouted down Pope John Paul II as he tried to say Mass during a visit. Therefore, while the activities of the Church contributed to the success of the Sandinista revolution, the hierarchy's opposition was a major factor in the downfall of the revolutionary government.

The relations between the Sandinistas and the Catholic Church started improving in 1986, starting with the appointment of Paolo Giglio as the new papal nuncio in Nicaragua in July. Giglio quickly earned the respect of the revolutionary government in November after attacking the United States for its hostility to the government, arguing that the Sandinistas were always open to negotiations with the United States but were turned down each time. That year, Vice President Sergio Ramírez was also received by the pope in a private audience. Once Congreso Eucaristico Nacional took place in Managua, Sandinistas leaders helped promote the congress and decried the lack of interest in it; President Ortega met with several Catholic clergymen during the congress, and also allowed Mother Teresa to bring four sisters into Nicaragua in order to create a new, small religious community. The Sandinista conflict with the Catholic Church was ultimately settled with the signing of the Esquipulas Peace Agreement - the government allowed Radio Catolica to broadcast again and allowed expelled clergy to return to Nicaragua.

Prior to their victory in the 2006 election, Ortega sought to rekindle his old relationship with the Catholic Church and befriended Cardinal Miguel Obando y Bravo, an erstwhile opponent of the Sandinistas in the 1980s. Bravo emerged as a close ally of Ortega, and in return Sandinistas expressed their support for a blanket ban on abortion in 2006, and in his speeches Ortega would refer to the reforged FSLN as "Christian socialist". Despite this, FSLN still faces tensions with the Catholic clergy outside of Nicaragua. On August 23, 2020, Bishop Silvio Báez, who had been outside of Nicaragua for reasons of security since April 23, 2019, accused President Ortega of being a dictator. The Centro Nicaragüense de Derechos Humanos (Nicaraguan Human Rights Center, CENIDH) said that the Church had been the victim of 24 attacks since April 2018, including a fire that began in the Immaculate Conception Cathedral when a Molotov cocktail was thrown at a sacred image of the Blood of Christ on July 31, 2020. The overall relationship with the Catholic Church further soured when the Ortega Regime seized the Jesuit-run University in 2023, calling it a "center of terrorism."

== Human rights violations by the Sandinistas ==
Time magazine in 1983 published reports of human rights violations in an article which stated that "According to Nicaragua's Permanent Commission on Human Rights, the regime detains several hundred people a month; about half of them are eventually released, but the rest simply disappear." Time also interviewed a former deputy chief of Nicaraguan military counterintelligence, who stated that he had fled Nicaragua after being ordered to kill 800 Miskito prisoners and make it look like they had died in combat. Another article described Sandinista neighbourhood "Defense Committees", modeled on similar Cuban Committees for the Defense of the Revolution, which according to critics were used to unleash mobs on anyone who was labeled a counterrevolutionary. Nicaragua's only opposition newspaper, La Prensa, was subject to strict censorship. The newspaper's editors were forbidden to print anything negative about the Sandinistas either at home or abroad.

Nicaragua's Permanent Commission on Human Rights reported 2,000 murders in the first six months and 3,000 disappearances in the first few years. It has since documented 14,000 cases of torture, rape, kidnapping, mutilation and murder.

The Inter-American Commission on Human Rights (IACHR) in a 1981 report found evidence for mass executions in the period following the revolution. It stated: "In the Commission's view, while the government of Nicaragua clearly intended to respect the lives of all those defeated in the civil war, during the weeks immediately subsequent to the Revolutionary triumph, when the government was not in effective control, illegal executions took place which violated the right to life, and these acts have not been investigated and the persons responsible have not been punished." The IACHR also stated that: "The Commission is of the view that the new regime did not have, and does not now have, a policy of violating the right to life of political enemies, including among the latter the former guardsmen of the Government of General Somoza, whom a large sector of the population of Nicaragua held responsible for serious human rights violations during the former regime; proof of the foregoing is the abolition of the death penalty and the high number of former guardsmen who were prisoners and brought to trial for crimes that constituted violations of human rights."

A 1983 IACHR report documented allegations of human rights violations against the Miskito Indians, which were alleged to have taken place after opposition forces (the Contras) infiltrated a Miskito village in order to launch attacks against government soldiers, and as part of a subsequent forced relocation program. Allegations included arbitrary imprisonment without trial, "disappearances" of such prisoners, forced relocation, and destruction of property. A 1984 IACHR report accused the Sandinistas of having "repeatedly violated the basic rights of Miskito Indians living there, including instances of "illegal killings" and torture". The report accused them of executing 35 to 40 Miskitos in Leimus in December 1981. The U.S. government accused Nicaragua of genocide. The U.S. Secretary of State Alexander Haig pointed to a photo published in Le Figaro alleged to show Miskito bodies being burned by Sandinista troops as evidence; however, the photo was actually of people killed by Somoza's National Guard in 1978.

The IACHR's 1991 annual report states: "In 1990, the Commission was informed of the discovery of common graves in Nicaragua, especially in areas where fighting had occurred. The information was provided by the Nicaraguan Pro Human Rights Association, which had received its first complaint in June 1990. By December 1991, that Association had received reports of 60 common graves and had investigated 15 of them. While most of the graves seem to be the result of summary executions by members of the Sandinista People's Army or the State Security, some contain the bodies of individuals executed by the Nicaraguan Resistance."

The IACHR's 1992 annual report contains details of mass graves and investigations which suggest that mass executions had been carried out. One such grave contained 75 corpses of peasants who were believed to have been executed in 1984 by government security forces pretending to be members of the Contras. Another grave was also found in the town of Quininowas which contained six corpses, believed to be an entire family killed by government forces when the town was invaded. A further 72 graves were reported as being found, containing bodies of people, the majority of whom were believed to have been executed by agents of the state and some also by the Contras.

=== Politicization of human rights ===
The issue of human rights also became highly politicized at this time as human rights is claimed to be a key component of propaganda created by the Reagan administration to help legitimize its policies in the region. The Inter-Church Committee on Human Rights in Latin America (ICCHRLA) in its Newsletter stated in 1985 that: "The hostility with which the Nicaraguan government is viewed by the Reagan administration is an unfortunate development. Even more unfortunate is the expression of that hostility in the destabilization campaign developed by the US administration. ... An important aspect of this campaign is misinformation and frequent allegations of serious human rights violations by the Nicaraguan authorities." Among the accusations in The Heritage Foundation report and the Demokratizatsiya article are references to alleged policies of religious persecution, particularly antisemitism. The ICCHRLA in its newsletter stated that: "From time to time the current U.S. administration, and private organizations sympathetic to it, have made serious and extensive allegations of religious persecution in Nicaragua. Colleague churches in the United States undertook onsite investigation of these charges in 1984. In their report, the delegation organized by the Division of Overseas Ministries of the National Council of Churches of Christ in the United States concluded that there is 'no basis for the charge of systematic religious persecution'. The delegation 'considers this issue to be a device being used to justify aggressive opposition to the present Nicaraguan government.'" On the other hand, some elements of the Catholic Church in Nicaragua, among them Archbishop Miguel Obando y Bravo, strongly criticized the Sandinistas. The Archbishop stated "The government wants a church that is aligned with the Marxist–Leninist regime." The Inter-American Commission on Human Rights states that: "Although it is true that much of the friction between the Government and the churches arises from positions that are directly or indirectly linked to the political situation of the country, it is also true that statements by high government officials, official press statements, and the actions of groups under the control of the Government have gone beyond the limits within which political discussions should take place and have become obstacles to certain specifically religious activities."

Human Rights Watch also stated in its 1989 report on Nicaragua that: "Under the Reagan administration, U.S. policy toward Nicaragua's Sandinista government was marked by constant hostility. This hostility yielded, among other things, an inordinate amount of publicity about human rights issues. Almost invariably, U.S. pronouncements on human rights exaggerated and distorted the real human rights violations of the Sandinista regime, and exculpated those of the U.S.-supported insurgents, known as the contras."

In 1987, a report was published by the UK based NGO Catholic Institute for International Relations (CIIR, now known as "Progressio"), a human rights organization which identifies itself with liberation theology. The report, "Right to Survive: Human Rights in Nicaragua", discussed the politicization of the human rights issue: "The Reagan administration, with scant regard for the truth, has made a concerted effort to paint as evil a picture as possible of Nicaragua, describing it as a 'totalitarian dungeon'. Supporters of the Sandinistas ... have argued that Nicaragua has a good record of human rights compared with other Central American countries and have compared Nicaragua with other countries at war." The CIIR report refers to estimates made by the NGO Americas Watch which count the number of non-battle related deaths and disappearances for which the government was responsible up to the year 1986 as "close to 300".

According to the CIIR report, Amnesty International and Americas Watch stated that there is no evidence that the use of torture was sanctioned by the Nicaraguan authorities, although prisoners reported the use of conditions of detention and interrogation techniques that could be described as psychological torture. The Red Cross made repeated requests to be given access to prisoners held in state security detention centers, but were refused. The CIIR was critical of the Permanent Commission on Human Rights (PCHR or CPDH in Spanish), claiming that the organisation had a tendency to immediately publish accusations against the government without first establishing a factual basis for the allegations. The CIIR report also questioned the independence of the Permanent Commission on Human Rights, referring to an article in The Washington Post which claims that the National Endowment for Democracy, an organization funded by the US government, allocated a concession of US$50,000 for assistance in the translation and distribution outside Nicaragua of its monthly report, and that these funds were administered by the Committee for Democracy in Central America (Prodemca), a US-based organization which later published full-page advertisements in The Washington Post and The New York Times supporting military aid to the Contras. The Permanent Commission denies that it received any money which it claims was instead used by others for translating and distributing their monthly reports in other nations.

The Nicaraguan-based magazine Revista Envio, which describes its stance as one of "critical support for the Sandinistas", refers to the report: "The CPDH: Can It Be Trusted?" written by Scottish lawyer Paul Laverty. In the report, Laverty observes that: "The entire board of directors [of the Permanent Commission], are members of or closely identify with the 'Nicaraguan Democratic Coordinating Committee' (Coordinadora), an alliance of the more right wing parties and COSEP, the business organization." He goes on to express concern about CPDH's alleged tendency to provide relatively few names and other details in connection with alleged violations. "According to the 11 monthly bulletins of 1987 (July being the only month without an issue), the CPDH claims to have received information on 1,236 abuses of all types. However, of those cases, only 144 names are provided. The majority of those 144 cases give dates and places of alleged incidents, but not all. This means that only in 11.65% of its cases is there the minimal detail provided to identify the person, place, date, incident and perpetrator of the abuse."

On the other hand, the Inter-American Commission on Human Rights states: "During its on-site observation in 1978 under the Government of General Somoza, the Permanent Commission on Human Rights in Nicaragua, (CPDH) gave the Commission notable assistance, which certainly helped it to prepare its report promptly and correctly." and in 1980 "It cannot be denied that the CPDH continues to play an important role in the protection of human rights, and that a good number of people who consider that their human rights have been ignored by the Government are constantly coming to it." The IACHR continued to meet with representatives of the Permanent Commission and report their assessments in later years.

The Heritage Foundation stated that: "While elements of the Somoza National Guard tortured political opponents, they did not employ psychological torture." The International Commission of Jurists stated that under the Somoza regime cruel physical torture was regularly used in the interrogation of political prisoners.

Throughout the 1980s the Sandinista government was regarded as "Partly Free" by Freedom House.

== United States government allegations of support for foreign rebels ==
The United States State Department accused the Sandinistas of many cases of illegal foreign intervention.

The first allegation was that the Sandinistas were supporting the FMLN rebels in El Salvador with safe haven, training, command-and-control headquarters, advice, weapons, ammunition, and other vital supplies. Captured documents, testimonials of former rebels and Sandinistas, aerial photographs, the tracing of captured weapons back to Nicaragua, and captured vehicles from Nicaragua smuggling weapons were cited as evidence. El Salvador was in a civil war in the period in question and the US was heavily supporting the Salvadoran government, led by José Napoleón Duarte, against the FMLN guerrillas.

The U.S. also made accusations of subversive activities in Honduras, Costa Rica, and Colombia, and in the case of Honduras and Costa Rica outright military operations by Nicaraguan troops.

In 2015, Kentucky senator Mitch McConnell claimed during an interview with CNN that Secretary of State John Kerry, "when he was a senator, flew to Managua and met with a communist dictator there, Daniel Ortega, and accused the Reagan administration of engaging in terrorism" in the 1980s. McConnell's comments came in the midst of the then-ongoing negotiations over the Iran Nuclear Deal, in which Kerry played a key role. Politifact rated McConnell's claim as "mostly true", but exaggerated, tracing it back to a statement Kerry had made to the Associated Press in 1985, shortly before leaving to meet Ortega, and a week before a scheduled vote on Reagan's request for an additional $14 million for the Contras. Kerry had said "Our foreign policy should represent the democratic values that have made our country great, not subvert those values by funding terrorism to overthrow governments of other countries".

During the Nicaraguan Revolution in the 1980s, American Democratic politician and then mayor Bernie Sanders expressed support for the Sandinistas and condemned US support for the Contras, he wrote letters to the group denouncing the US media portrayal of the conflict, and also visited Nicaragua during the war where he attended a Sandinista rally where anti-American chants were reportedly being done. When asked in 2019 if he remembered hearing those chants when he was there, Sanders said "I don’t remember, no. Of course there was anti-American sentiment there. This was a war being funded by the United States against the people of Nicaragua. People were being killed in that war".

== Symbols ==
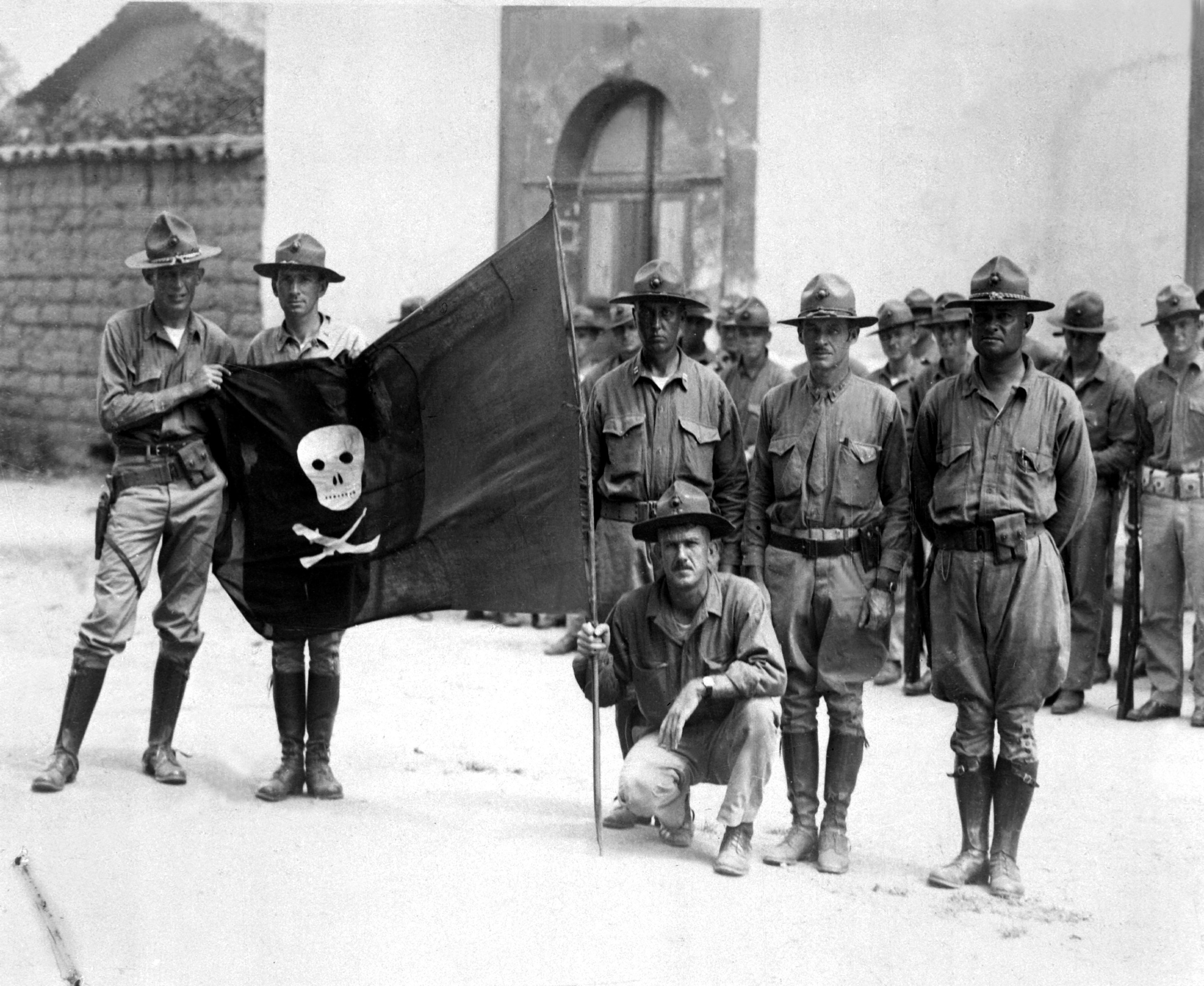
U.S. Marines with the captured flag of Augusto César Sandino in Nicaragua, 1932

The flag of the FSLN consists of an upper half in red, a lower half in black, and the letters F S L N in white. It is a modified version of the flag Sandino used in the 1930s, during the war against the U.S. occupation of Nicaragua which consisted of two vertical stripes, equally in size, one red and the other black with a skull (like the traditional Jolly Roger flag). These colors came from the Mexican anarchist movements that Sandino was involved with during his stay in Mexico in the early 1920s. (The traditional flag of anarcho-syndicalism, which joins diagonally the red color of the labour movement and the black color of anarchism, as in the flag of the CNT, is a negation of nationalism and reaffirmation of internationalism.)

In recent times, there has been a dispute between the FSLN and the dissident Sandinista Renovation Movement (MRS) about the use of the red and black flag in public activities. Although the MRS has its own flag (orange with a silhouette of Sandino's hat in black), they also use the red-and-black flag in honor of Sandino's legacy. They state that the red-and-black flag is a symbol of Sandinismo as a whole, not only of the FSLN party.

Sandinista Revolution Day is a national holiday, celebrated on July 19 each year.

== In popular culture ==
=== In films ===
- In the gay cult classic film To Wong Foo, Thanks for Everything! Julie Newmar (1995), Vida (Patrick Swayze) was trying to convince Noxeema Jackson (Wesley Snipes) to take a young drag queen, Chi-Chi Rodriguez, to Hollywood to compete in a drag competition. Noxeema was totally against the idea and quotes this line: "Mmm, Mmm, Mmm, not on your young queer life—you and your causes. That child is Latin, you does not wanna get mixed up in all that Latin mess ... she might turn out to be a Sandinista or something."
- The film Last Plane Out (1983), about journalist Jack Cox's experiences in Nicaragua, portrayed the Sandinistas as crazed communist psychopaths while making Anastasio Somoza Debayle look sympathetic by comparison.
- The 1983 American political thriller Under Fire, starring Nick Nolte, Gene Hackman and Joanna Cassidy, is set during the last days of the 1979 Nicaraguan Revolution that ended the Somoza regime.
- Scenes covering the war were featured in the 1987 feature film Broadcast News.

=== In games ===
- The video game Metal Gear Solid: Peace Walker (2010) includes a group of FSLN Revolutionaries forced into Costa Rica as an important group of supporting characters, including Amanda. The Anti-Somoza revolution itself figures prominently into the plot of the game as well, being described within the game's narrative as being started by KGB agent Vladimir Zadornov in order to make Nicaragua a communist state so the Soviet Union could force the United States out of Central America entirely.

=== In language ===
- Since the conflict with Nicaragua in the 1980s, variations of the term "Sandinista" are now sometimes used in the United States to refer to fanatical supporters of a certain cause. In the Spanish language, the suffix "-ista" is used to indicate a predilection towards the root and is the equivalent of "-ist" in English.

=== In literature ===
- Roger Ebert, in his review of Into the Wild (2007), likened the film's subject – the American hiker and itinerant traveler Christopher McCandless – to his childhood friend, Joseph David "Joe" Sanderson, a nature-loving Illinois native and adventurer, who died in combat, fighting in Morazán, El Salvador as a Sandinista freedom fighter (in April 1982, one of only two Americans known to have died while in the ranks of that country's leftist guerrilla movement in the 1980s and 1990s). Ebert wrote:

I grew up in Urbana three houses down from the Sanderson family – Milton and Virginia and their boys Steve and Joe. My close friend was Joe. His bedroom was filled with aquariums, terrariums, snakes, hamsters, spiders, and butterfly and beetle collections. I envied him like crazy. After college he hit the road. He never made a break from his parents, but they rarely knew where he was. Sometimes he came home and his mother would have to sew $100 bills into the seams of his blue jeans. He disappeared in Nicaragua. His body was later identified as a dead Sandinista freedom fighter. From a nice little house surrounded by evergreens at the other end of Washington Street, he left to look for something he needed to find. I believe in Sean Penn's Christopher McCandless. I grew up with him.

=== In music ===
- The popular Puerto Rican Reggaeton–rap band Calle 13 mentioned the Sandinista movement in their song "Llegale a mi guarida" (2007). The lyrics claimed: "Respeto a Nicaragua y a la lucha sandinista" ("I respect Nicaragua and the Sandinista struggle").
- The English anarcho-punk band Chumbawamba recorded the song "An Interlude: Beginning To Take It Back" on their album Pictures of Starving Children Sell Records (1986). The song chronicles the history of the Sandinistas, as well as their conflict with the Contras, and reflects an optimistic hope for the future of Nicaragua.
- The Chilean new wave group Los Prisioneros mention the Sandinistas in their song "¿Quién mató a Marilyn?", in a passage asking, "Who killed Marilyn Monroe?" The song was released on the 1984 album La voz de los '80 (Spanish for The Voice of the 80s).
- As a reaction to an anti-Sandinista statement by British Prime Minister Margaret Thatcher and her proposal to ban the use of the word itself, punk rock group The Clash used the title Sandinista! (1980) for their fourth studio album. The triple album contains the song "Washington Bullets", which references the Sandinistas and other events and groups involved in Latin American history, starting from 1959.
- In the song titled "Highwomen" by the US-based country music group The Highwomen, the first verse states "I was a Highwoman, And a mother from my youth, For my children I did what I had to do, My family left Honduras when they killed the Sandinistas, We followed a coyote through the dust of Mexico, Every one of them except for me survived, And I am still alive."
- The Irish rebel song "Croppies who will not lie down" references numerous revolutionary groups around the world and includes the lines "In Central America there they do strive, to rid themselves free of those Washington clowns; Freedom's the game, Sandinista's the name, of the Croppies who will not lie down".
- The Brazilian musician Chico Science, founder of the 'Manguebeat' movement, in his song "Monólogo ao pé do ouvido", makes reference to Augusto César Sandino and other personalities who resisted the status quo in their respective realities. The verse states: "Viva Zapata! Viva Sandino! Viva Zumbi! Antônio Conselheiro! Todos os Panteras Negras. Lampião, sua imagem e semelhança."

=== In television ===
- In the pilot episode of Fear the Walking Dead, Salvadoran refugee Daniel Salazar (Rubén Blades) is working as a Los Angeles barber, but in season 1, episode 5 ("Cobalt"), "we learn Salazar's true past: No, this simple barber wasn't so simple at all. As a younger man [in El Salvador], he was given the choice between torturer and victim, and he chose the path that kept him alive."
- In the 1990 episode "Mary Has a Little Lamb" of the American sitcom The Golden Girls, Blanche, Dorothy, and Rose return home to find Sophia bound, gagged, and tied to a chair. When Dorothy removes the gag and asks who has done this to her, Sophia sarcastically replies: "the Sandinistas!" (It was really a released prisoner named Merrill, who was searching for Blanche.)
- In Snowfall, mainly set in Los Angeles, California during the early-eighties, one of the main characters is an undercover CIA agent selling cocaine to local drug dealers with the intent of using the money to fund the Contras in their fight against the Sandinistas.
- In the second season of The Americans, the Jennings' learn of a covert effort by the US government to train the Contras' on American soil, and are aided by a fiery Sandinista operative in attempting to disrupt the training camp by killing the leadership and leaking the evidence of the camp

== Presidents of the Executive ==
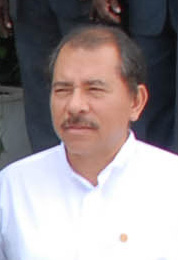
Daniel Ortega

Daniel Ortega has been the only Sandinista President of the Republic, from 1985 to 1990 and from 2007 to the present day.

== Prominent Sandinistas ==
- Bayardo Arce Castaño, hard-line National Directorate member in the 1980s
- Rita Arauz, lesbian and gay rights activist in Nicaragua
- Patrick Argüello, Sandinista involved with the Dawson's Field hijackings
- Nora Astorga, Sandinista UN ambassador
- Monica Baltodano, former guerrilla commander and Minister of Regional Affairs from 1982 to 1990
- Gioconda Belli, novelist and poet, handled media relations for the FSLN government
- Tomás Borge, one of the FSLN's founders, leader of the Prolonged People's War tendency in the 1970s, Minister of Interior in the 1980s
- Omar Cabezas, Sandinista leader; also an author and politician
- Ernesto Cardenal, poet and priest; Minister of Culture in the 1980s
- Fernando Cardenal, a Jesuit priest and brother of Ernesto, directed the literacy campaign as Minister of Education
- Luis Carrión, 1980s National Directorate member
- Rigoberto Cruz (aka Pablo Ubeda), early FSLN member
- Joaquín Cuadra, internal front leader, later chief of staff of the army
- Miguel D'Escoto, a Maryknoll Roman Catholic priest; served as Nicaragua's foreign minister
- Idania Fernandez, member of the Rigoberto López Pérez Regional Command; killed in action
- Carlos Fonseca, one of the FSLN's principal founders and leading ideologist in the 1960s
- Adeline Gröns y Schindler-McCoy de Argüello-Olivas, a journalist, university professor, diplomat Ambassador to East Germany, Consul General to the United Nations, Ambassador to the OAS, Ambassador to the Soviet Union, Soviet Dean of Ambassadors, has worked in various administarions with high-profile jobs.
- Herty Lewites, former mayor of Managua, opponent of Daniel Ortega in 2005
- Silvio Mayorga, FSLN co-founder
- Daniel Ortega, post-revolution junta head, then President from 1985, lost presidential elections in 1990, 1996, and 2001, won presidential elections in 2006, 2011 and 2016 and continues to lead the FSLN party
- Humberto Ortega, leader of the FSLN Insurrectional Tendency (Tercerista) in the 1970s, chief strategist of the anti-Somoza urban insurrection; Minister of Defense in the 1980s during the Contra war. Brother of Daniel Ortega.
- Edén Pastora "Comandante Cero", social democratic guerrilla leader who joined the Terceristas during the anti-Somoza insurrection, broke with FSLN to lead center-left ARDE contra group based in Costa Rica during the early 1980s
- Sergio Ramírez, novelist and civilian Sandinista, architect of alliance with moderates in the 1970s, Vice President in the 1980s, opponent of Daniel Ortega in the 1990s
- Henry Ruiz, "Comandante Modesto", FSLN rural guerrilla commander in the 1970s, member of the National Directorate in the 1980s
- Casimiro A. Sotelo, architect, political activist, original member of The Group of 12, Ambassador to Panama, Consul General to the United Nations, Ambassador to the OAS, Ambassador to Canada, Canadian Dean of Latin American Ambassadors
- Arlen Siu, a Chinese Nicaraguan who became one of the first female martyrs of the Sandinista revolution
- Dora María Téllez, a Nicaraguan historian most famous as an icon of the Sandinista Revolution
- Jaime Wheelock, leader of the FSLN Proletarian Tendency, Minister of Agriculture and Rural Development
- Dorotea Wilson, later congresswoman and activist

== Electoral history ==
=== Presidential elections ===
Election	Party candidate	Votes	%	Result
1984	Daniel Ortega	735,967	66.97%	Elected ✓
1990	Daniel Ortega	579.886	40.82%	Lost ✗
1996	Daniel Ortega	664,909	37.83%	Lost ✗
2001	Daniel Ortega	922,436	42.28%	Lost ✗
2006	Daniel Ortega	854.316	38.07%	Elected ✓
2011	Daniel Ortega	1,569,287	62.46%	Elected ✓
2016	Daniel Ortega	1,806,651	72.44%	Elected ✓
2021	Daniel Ortega	2,093,834	75.87%	Elected ✓

=== National Assembly elections ===
Election	Party leader	Votes	%	Seats	+/–	Position
1984	Daniel Ortega	729,159	66.78%	61 / 96	▲61	▲1st
1990	Daniel Ortega	579,723	40.84%	39 / 92	▼22	▼2nd
1996	Daniel Ortega	626,178	36.46%	36 / 93	▼3	2nd
2001	Daniel Ortega	915,417	42.6%	39 / 92	▲3	2nd
2006	Daniel Ortega	840,851	37.59%	38 / 92	▼1	▲1st
2011	Daniel Ortega	1,583,199	60.85%	63 / 92	▲25	1st
2016	Daniel Ortega	1,590,316	65.86%	70 / 92	▲7	1st
2021	Daniel Ortega	2,039,717	74.17%	75 / 90	▲5	1st

== See also ==
- Carlos Mejía Godoy
- Iran–Contra affair
- Komite internazionalistak
- List of books and films about Nicaragua
- Nicaragua v. United States

Preceded by Francisco Urcuyo Maliaños	Presidency of Nicaragua (Junta of National Reconstruction); 1979–1984	Succeeded by Daniel Ortega Saavedra
