= Joaquín Cuadra =

Nicaraguan politician (born 1951)

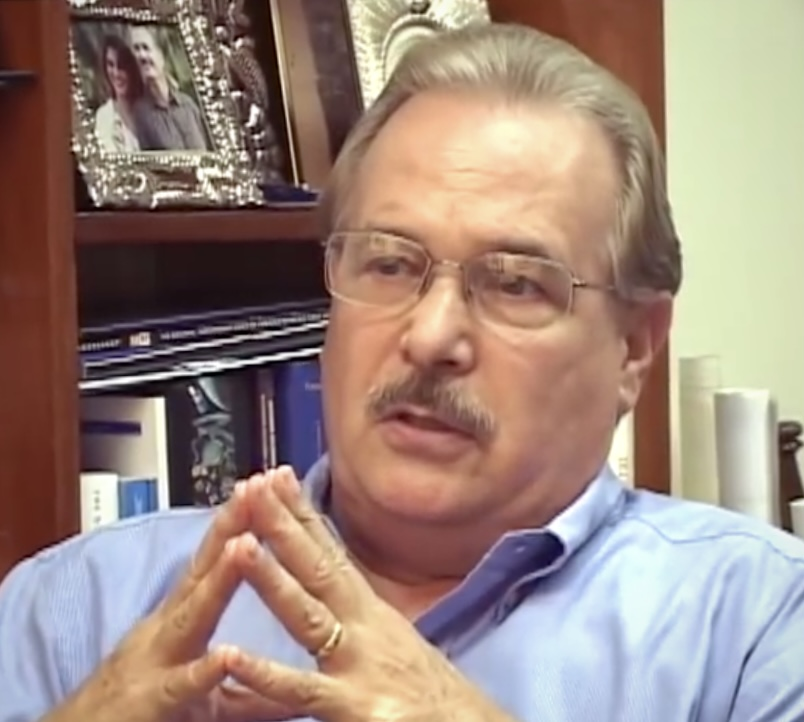
Cuadra in 2005

Joaquín Cuadra Lacayo (born April 11, 1951 in Managua) a scion of Nicaragua's elite, joined the rebel Sandinista National Liberation Front (FSLN) in late 1972. After their victory in 1979, he became army chief of staff.

== Biography ==
Cuadra studied at Colegio Centro America, a Jesuit high school in Nicaragua, where he became interested in politics, liberation theology, and Marxism. While attending the University of Central America, he and other students were impressed by one of their professors, Father Uriel Molina, who lived among the poor in Managua's El Riguero barrio. In November 1971, they established a commune with him in El Riguero. Cuadra was recruited into the FSLN by Ricardo Morales and Oscar Turcios in late 1972 and went underground early the next year.

He was a member of the Sandinista Commando that raided the Christmas party of a major Somoza supporter in 1974, exchanging imprisoned Sandinistas for the prominent guests. As the FSLN divided over questions of strategy, he aligned himself with the Tercerista faction. In 1977, he recruited his father to politically support the FSLN as one of Los Doce. As leader of the Sandinista Internal Front, he helped support Eden Pastora's capture of the National Palace in August 1978 and coordinated urban guerrilla actions during the 1979 Nicaraguan Revolution.

After the victory, he was promoted to general and chief of staff of the new Sandinista Popular Army. He assumed leadership of the Nicaraguan army from the hands of Humberto Ortega on February 21, 1995. After retiring from the army, he founded the National Unity Movement in 2000.

He criticized the candidacy of Daniel Ortega in the 2006 Nicaraguan general election alleging that the new government imposed its criteria and was intolerant of criticism.

During the Protests in Nicaragua in 2018, the retired general questioned the government's decision to send the armed forces to counter the demonstrations.
