= Komite internazionalistak =

Komite internazionalistak is an internationalist organisation based in the Basque Country. It was founded to support the Sandinista revolution in Nicaragua. It has promoted brigades to various countries to help popular movements and extend their message in the European society. It has been very active in the movement against the 2003 invasion of Iraq and the following occupation. It has also denounced alleged human rights violations in Palestine.
