= Jaime Wheelock =

Nicaraguan politician

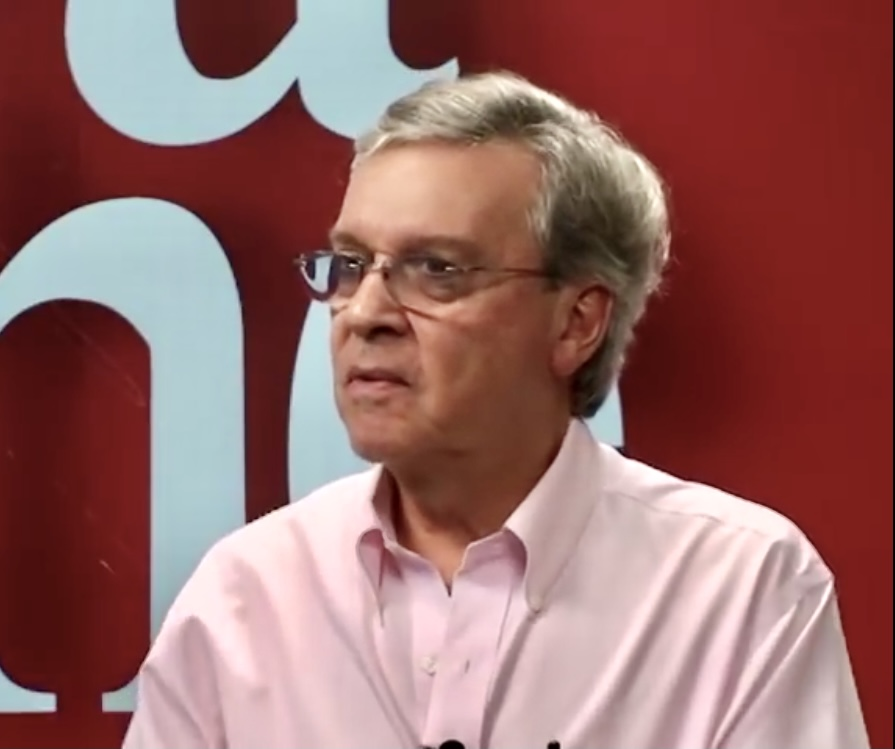
Jaime Wheelock in a 2018 interview

Jaime Wheelock Román (born May 30, 1947) is a Nicaraguan politician. Member of The Sandinista Liberation Front from 1967, he was named as a member of the National Directorate in 1973. Wheelock graduated as lawyer and sociologist by University of Chile and FLACSO, Chile. He was the leader of the "Proletarian Tendency" in the 1970s, and one of the nine commanders of the Nicaraguan Sandinista Revolution that overthrew the Somoza regime. After 1979 he became minister for agriculture and agrarian reform in the Sandinista government of the 1980s. After 1990 he obtained a master's degree in public administration at Harvard University. Wheelock has written several books: Imperialismo y Dictadura, Raíces Indígenas de la Lucha anticolonialista en Nicaragua, Diciembre Victorioso, El Desarrollo Economico de Nicaragua, and La Reforma Agraria Sandinista, amongst other publications. Since 1996 he has been the President of the NGO Instituto para el Desarrollo y la Democracia IPADE.
