= Monterroso (disambiguation) =

Monterroso is a Galician municipality.

Monterroso may also refer to:

== Places ==
- Rio Monterroso, an intermittent stream in the Province of Málaga, Spain

== People ==
- Augusto Monterroso, a Guatemalan writer
- Benjamín Monterroso, a Guatemalan football coach
- José Benito Monterroso, a Uruguayan cleric
- Ana Monterroso de Lavalleja

== See also ==
- Monterrosa, a surname
- Monterosso (disambiguation)
- Monterosa (disambiguation)
