= List of tunnels in Spain =

This list of tunnels in Spain includes any road, rail or waterway tunnel in Spain.

- Guadarrama Tunnel (28,377 m High-speed railway)
- Pajares Base Tunnel (24,667 m High-speed railway)
- M-30 / Calle-30 By-pass Sur (12,000 m Road)
- M-50/M-61 Tunel del Pardo (11,500 m Road, project)
- Tunnels de San Pedro (8,930 m High-speed railway)
- Tunnel del Somport (8,608 m Road)
- Perthus Tunnel (8,350 m High-speed railway)
- Northern Access Tunnel to Vigo (8,100 m High-speed railway, under construction)
- Tunnel del Somport (7,710 m Railway, closed)
- Tunnels del Abdalajís (7,300 m High-speed railway)
- Tunnel de la Risa II (7,700 m Railway)
- Tunnel de la Risa III (7,500 m High-speed railway)
- Tunnel de la Risa I (7,300 m Railway)
- Tunnels del Ave in Valencia (7,000 m High-speed railway, under construction)
- Engaña Tunnel (6,976m - never used)
- Tunnel of Provença (5,640 m High-speed railway)
- (Viella I) Alfonso XIII Tunnel (5,230 m Road, semi-closed)
- (Viella II) Juan Carlos I Tunnel (5,240 m Road)
- Túnel del Cadí (5,026 m Road)
- Tunnel de Paracuellos (4,672 m High-speed railway)
- Tunnel del Bracons (4,500 m Road)
- M-30 By-pass Norte-Pio XII (4,187 m Road, project)
- Negrón Tunnel (4,144 m Road)
- Tunnel de Somosierra (3,895 m Railway)
- Tunnel de Isuskitza (3,377 m Road)
- AP-6 Guadarrama nº2 (3,340 m Road)
- Tunnel de La Aldea (3,176 m Road)
- AP-6 Guadarrama nº3 (3,148 m Road)
- Tunnel de Bielsa-Aragnouet (3,070 m Road)
- Tunnel de Soller (3,023 m Road)
- Tunnel del Monrepós (2,900 m Road, under construction)
- AP-6 Guadarrama nº1 (2,870 m Road)
- Tunnel de la Hechicera (2,835 m High-speed railway)
- M-111 Madrid-Aeropuerto (2,600 m Road)
- Tunnel de Piqueras (2,598 m Road)
- Tunnel de Vallvidrera (2,517 m Road)
- Tunnel de Taurito (2,467 m Road)
- Tunnel de Pedralba (2,444 m Road)
- Tunnel de Faneque (2,044 m Road)
- Rio Monterroso (1,160 m Culvert)

== See also ==
- List of tunnels by location
