= Monterosso =

Monterosso or Monte Rosso means Red Mountain in Italian and may refer to:

== Places ==
=== Italy ===
- Monterosso al Mare, a municipality in the Province of La Spezia, Liguria
- Monterosso Almo, a municipality in the Province of Ragusa, Sicily
- Monterosso Calabro, a municipality in the Province of Vibo Valentia, Calabria
- Monterosso Grana, a municipality in the Province of Cuneo, Piedmont
- Monterosso, a hamlet of Abano Terme and Teolo, Province of Padua, Veneto
- Monte Rosso or Roteck, a mountain of South Tyrol
- Monte Rosso (Colli Euganei), a mountain of the Veneto

== People with the surname ==
- Francesco Monterosso (born 1991), Australian football (soccer) player

== Other uses ==
- Monterosso (horse), British-bred Thoroughbred racehorse

== See also ==
- Monterroso (disambiguation)
