= Engaña Tunnel =

Unfinished railway tunnel in Spain's Cantabrian Mountains

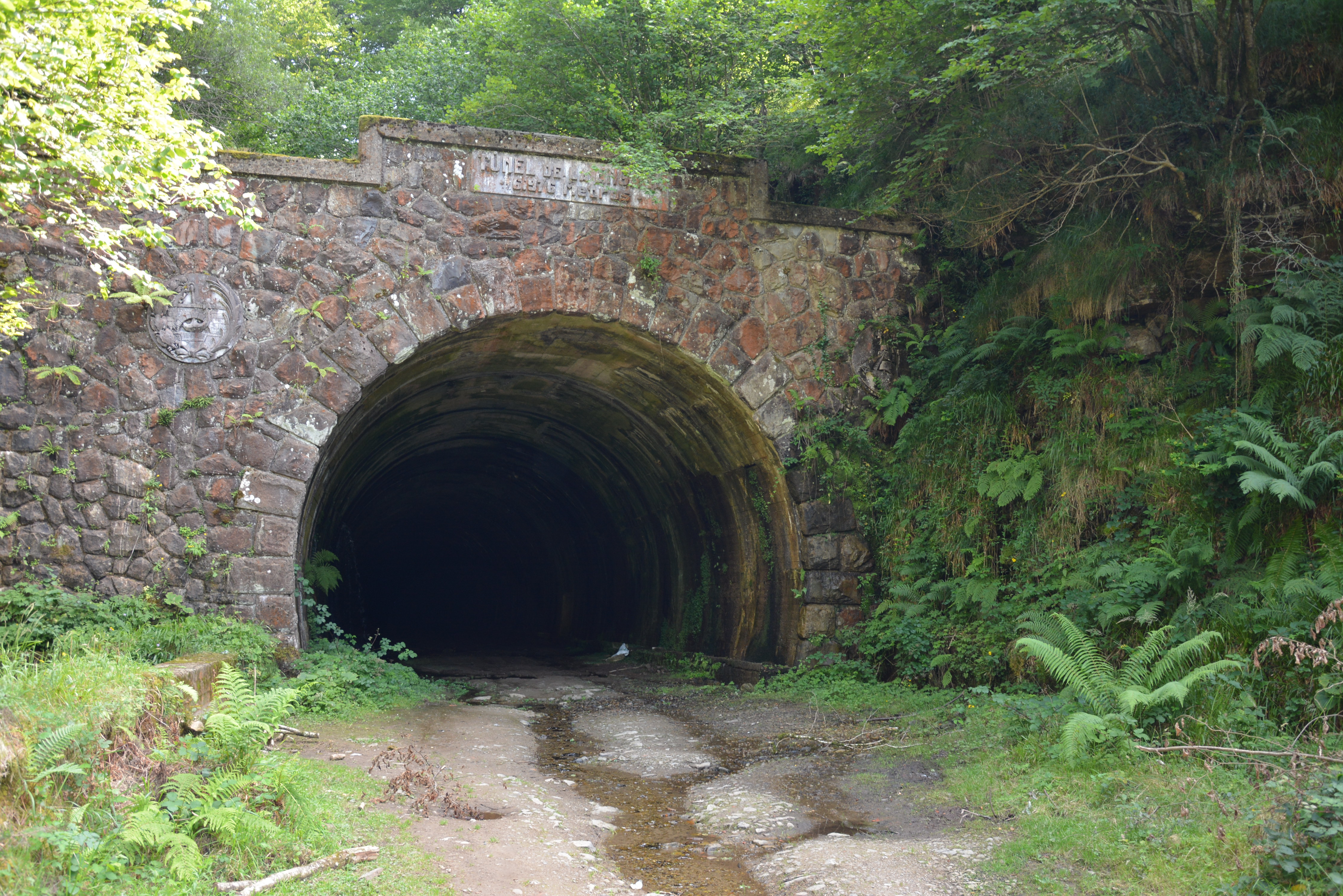
- The northern mouth of the Engaña Tunnel, in the municipality of Vega de Pas (2015).
- Interactive map of Engaña Tunnel

Overview
- Location: Cantabria and Burgos, Spain
- Coordinates: 43°06′56″N 3°44′32″W
- Status: Abandoned
- Start: Vega de Pas, Cantabria; 43°06′56″N 3°44′32″W
- End: Merindad de Valdeporres, Burgos; 43°03′11″N 3°44′04″W

Operation
- Constructed: 1941–59

Technical
- Length: 6,976 m (22,887 ft)
- Max elevation: 748 m (2,454 ft)
- Min elevation: 632 m (2,073 ft)

The Engaña Tunnel (Spanish: Túnel de la Engaña) is a never-completed railway tunnel in Spain, connecting the provinces of Burgos and Cantabria through the Cantabrian Mountains. The tunnel was part of the proposed Santander–Mediterranean railway line, an attempt by the Spanish government to connect the Bay of Biscay with the Mediterranean Sea. The construction lasted for over seventeen years, from 1941 to 1959, employing hundreds of workers, including Republican prisoners during the first years. At the time of its construction, it was the longest railway tunnel in Spain, with a length of 6,976 metres (22,887 ft), but was never completed as the rails were never laid.

In 1961, the construction of the railway line was suspended as a result of restrictions on public investment in Spain, and the tunnel was never completed. It was later used by residents of the area and truck drivers as an alternate road, but became impassable by vehicles after the collapse of some parts of the structure in 1999 and 2005.

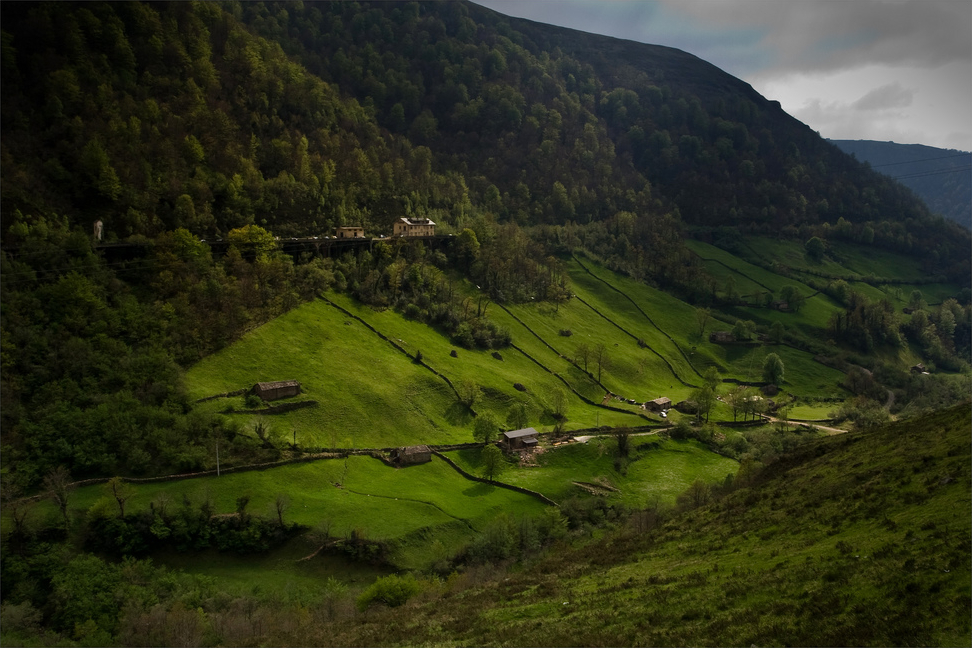
The abandoned railway station of Yera is at the northern mouth of the Engaña Tunnel.

== History ==
=== Background ===
The Engaña Tunnel is part of the Santander–Mediterranean railway, a proposed railway line between the ports of Santander and Sagunto to connect the Bay of Biscay with the Mediterranean Sea. The project dates back to the 19th century, but the work on the line started in 1925 during the dictatorship of Miguel Primo de Rivera, with the railway between Calatayud and Sagunto already existing. By the end of 1930, construction had been completed on the section between Calatayud and Dosante. Although only 63 kilometres (39 mi) remained separating the railway from Santander, the hilly and rough terrain required the construction of several tunnels and viaducts. Several options were proposed and it was eventually decided to build a railway line with 32 tunnels between Santelices and Boo, including the Engaña Tunnel.

=== Construction ===
In 1941, two years after the end of the Spanish Civil War, the Francoist Spain awarded the contract to complete construction of the tunnel to "Ferrocarriles y Construcciones ABC". The company employed penal labor from labor camps at each mouth of the tunnel, with a work force of 560 prisoners by 1943, many of whom were Republicans. They constructed the first 500 metres (1,600 ft), but in 1945, most of the prisoners left as they benefited from a pardon decree approved by Francisco Franco. The construction of the tunnel was resumed in 1951 with another contractor, "Portolés y Cía" and the construction lasted until 26 April 1959, when the teams from the two entrances met. The tunnel was officially inaugurated on 9 May 1959, although the construction had not yet been completed.

As least 16 workers had died during the construction from 1951 to 1959, and no figure is known for the construction during the first years. A large number of the workers eventually died from silicosis, a form of occupational lung disease caused by inhalation of crystalline silica dust.

In 1961, the construction of the Santander–Mediterranean railway line was indefinitely halted with only 39 kilometres (24 mi) left to build. Although the construction of the Engaña Tunnel had been finished two years before, rails were never laid. The construction works were stopped as a result of restrictions on public investment in Spain after the introduction of the Plan Nacional de Estabilización Económica in 1959, following an unfavorable report from the World Bank in May 1959. Two further reports advised the suspension of construction of new railway lines, one issued by the state-owned RENFE in 1961, and the other issued by the World Bank in 1962. It was also claimed that the construction may have been stopped by the oligarchy of the Basque Country, who wanted to avoid competition from the port of Santander. In an article titled The Santander-Mediterranean Railway: a history of failure, Juanjo Olaizola and Francisco de los Cobos Arteaga dismissed this theory, while they also argued that the line was doomed "almost from its inception" because, among other reasons, the railway was not the "most logical and economical" solution to connect the Mediterranean Sea with the Bay of Biscay and there had been rapid development of road transport network. They deemed that the project could have only been undertaken by a "complex web of corruption".

The tunnel has a length of 6,976 metres (22,887 ft), with a slight curve in the first 300 metres (980 ft) of the southern entrance, while the rest is completely straight. In 1959, the contracted company stated that 100,000 cubic metres (3,500,000 cu ft) of concrete, 20,000 cubic metres (710,000 cu ft) of cement, 575,000 kilograms (1,268,000 lb) of explosives and 70 tonnes (77 short tons) of steel had been used. The construction consumed 20 million kilowatt hours, while 600,000 cubic metres (21,000,000 cu ft) of debris were extracted from the tunnel and the investment was estimated at 300 million pesetas. The reported lack of proper steel reinforcement in the structure led to widespread deterioration of the infrastructure, which later caused the collapse of some sections. The quality of the material used decreased as the tunnel construction rate was increased from half a meter per day in the early 1950s to three meters per day during the last years. By 1964, a report described the deterioration of the tunnel caused by the harsh climate of the region and the lack of maintenance, with suggestions to wall up the tunnels in order to prevent the formation of ice inside.

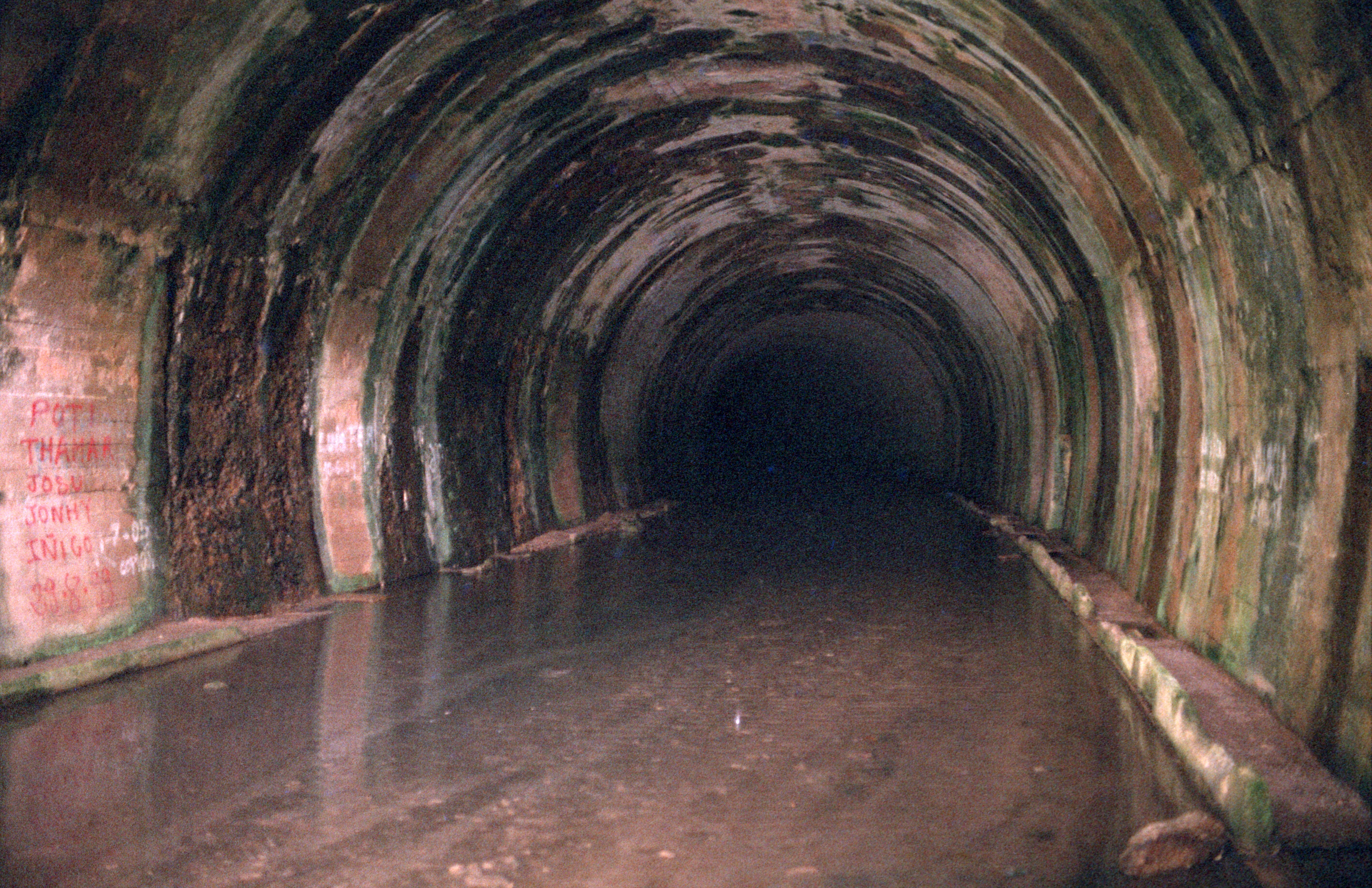
Some sections of the tunnel remain flooded due to lack of maintenance.

=== Aftermath ===
In 1985, the Spanish government decided to close all of the Spanish railway lines with a rate of return below 23 percent of operating costs, which included most of the Santander–Mediterranean railway between Calatayud and Dosante. After the remaining sections of the Santander–Mediterranean line were closed and any possibility of using the tunnel for a railway was ruled out, there were requests by residents of the area to adapt the structure for use as a road tunnel. In 2001, the Ministry of Public Works and Transport commissioned a feasibility study to build a road, but technicians advised against it, considering that the tunnel was too long for a road, would have to be widened to accommodate two lanes, and would have an estimated cost of 40–50 million Euros.

For years the tunnel was used by residents of the area, herders, recreational off-roaders and truck drivers who found the mountain passes snowbound during part of the winter. The southern entrance was walled up and sections of the structure collapsed in 1999 and 2005, making it impassable for vehicles due to ceiling debris. Travel through the tunnel on foot is extremely dangerous, as there are ceiling-high piles of debris, some sections remaining flooded, and concerns about the risk of further landslides. The six kilometers between the southern entrance and Santelices have been turned into a rail trail, as part of a proposed 106-kilometre (66 mi) greenway between the tunnel and Burgos.

== See also ==
- List of never used railways
- List of tunnels in Spain
