= Frente Obrero (disambiguation) =

Frente Obrero (Spanish for 'Workers' Front') was an anti-Sandinista trade union in 1970s–1980s Nicaragua.

Frente Obrero, and similarly named organisations, may also refer to:

- Workers' Front (Spain), electoral front for the Marxist–Leninist Party (Communist Reconstruction) (founded 2018)
- Workers' Liberation Front (Curaçao), a populist centre-left political party (founded 1969)
- Workers' Front of Catalonia, an anti-Francoist movement (1961–1970)
- Worker Peasant Student and Popular Front, a minor communist party in Peru, now associated with the Workers' Party of Korea (DPRK) (founded 1977)
