= Juan Antonio Lavalleja =

19th-century Uruguayan revolutionary, general, and political figure (1784–1853)

- Portrait by José Luis Zorilla de San Martín

President of Uruguay
- In office 25 September 1853 – 22 October 1853
- Preceded by: Venancio Flores
- Succeeded by: Fructuoso Rivera

Personal details
- Born: 24 June 1784 Minas, Viceroyalty of the Río de la Plata (now Uruguay)
- Died: 22 October 1853 (aged 69)

Juan Antonio Lavalleja y de la Torre (June 24, 1784 – October 22, 1853) was a Uruguayan libertador, revolutionary, military general, and political figure. He was born in Minas, in a region now named after him as the Lavalleja Department of Uruguay.

== Pre-Independence role ==
Lavalleja led the group called the Thirty-Three Orientals during Uruguay's Declaration of Independence from the Empire of Brazil in 1825. His leadership of this group has taken on somewhat mythic proportions in popular Uruguayan historiography.

Before leading the Thirty-Three, he had been captured by the Portuguese in 1818 and returned to Uruguay in 1821. Lavalleja first met Fructuoso Rivera, another leading Uruguayan politician of his era and a future rival, in 1825 during an event that would become known as the Abrazo del Monzón (Embrace of the Monsoon).

== Post-Independence career ==
After Uruguay's declaration of independence in 1825, Lavalleja was brigadier general and commander-in-chief of its national army between 1825 and 1828. He led his forces to victory at the Battle of Sarandí and commanded the forces of the Banda Oriental among allied forces of the United Provinces of the Río de la Plata to victory in the Battle of Ituzaingó, creating conditions for Uruguayan independence to be recognized in the Treaty of Montevideo in 1828.

In 1830, under the Constitution of Uruguay of 1830, Lavalleja sought national presidency as a rival to Fructuoso Rivera, but he lost. In protest of his loss, Lavalleja contributed to what is now known as the Uruguayan Civil War ended in 1851. He was then part of a triumvirate chosen in 1852 to govern Uruguay, but he died shortly after his accession to power, on October 22, 1853, in Montevideo.

== Historical legacy ==
Lavalleja is remembered as a rebel who led the fight against the Empire of Brazil. As one of the major figures in early, post-independence Uruguayan history he is identified as a skilled but reactionary warrior who contributed to the culture of intermittent civil war which dogged Uruguay for much of the 19th century.

== Family ==
Lavalleja married Ana Monterroso in 1817; she was sister of José Benito Monterroso.

== See also ==
- Politics of Uruguay
- Treaty of Independence of Cisplatine in a new country, the Uruguay - 1828

Political offices
Preceded by Venancio Flores	President of Uruguay; 1853	Succeeded by Fructuoso Rivera
