= Carlos Domingo Cuadra Cuadra =

Nicaraguan politician and publicist

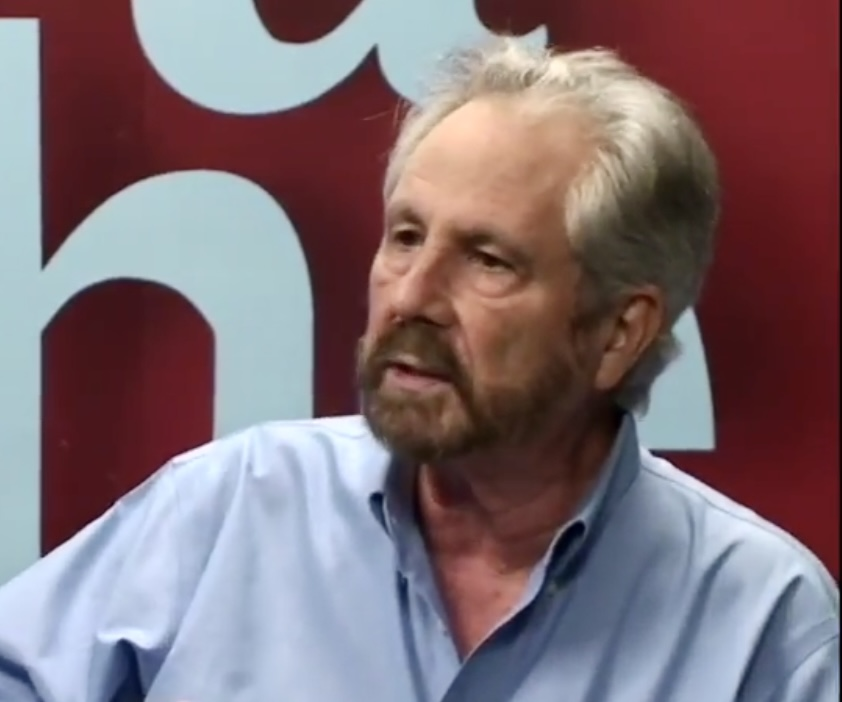
- Carlos Cuadra in a 2017 interview

Personal details
- Born: 1955 (age 70–71)
- Party: Marxist–Leninist Popular Action Movement

Carlos Domingo Cuadra Cuadra is a Nicaraguan politician and publicist. His parents were Carlos Cuadra Cardenal (from a family tracing their lineage to King James I of Aragon) and Olga Cuadra Sandino. He had three sons with his wife Maria Eugenia Rodriguez called Carlos Roberto, Diego Armando and Luis Miguel Cuadra Rodriguez.

In the 1980s, Cuadra was a member of the Executive Secretariat of the Marxist–Leninist Popular Action Movement (MAP-ML) and served as the director of the newspaper El Pueblo. In early 1980 was sentenced to two years of prison labour for statements expressed in El Pueblo, deemed counter-revolutionary by the new government. Cuadra Cuadra and other personalities sentenced in the same penal case appealed the ruling, and the sentence was revised to three months prison labour. He became editor-in-chief of Prensa Proletaria in 1982.

Cuadra represented the MAP-ML in the National Assembly 1984-1990. As a member of parliament, he opposed the 1987 Constitution of Nicaragua draft, labeling it 'bourgeois'.

Cuadra was the vice-presidential candidate of MAP-ML in the 1990 Nicaraguan general election. The ticket got 8,115 votes nationwide.

Cuadra later left politics, and became director in advertising.
