= Marxist–Leninist Popular Action Movement =

Marxist-Leninist Popular Action Movement
- Founded: 1970s
- Ideology: Communism; Marxism–Leninism; Hoxhaism; Anti-revisionism
- Political position: Far-left

Popular Action Movement - Marxist–Leninist (Movimiento de Acción Popular - Marxista–Leninista) is a Hoxhaist communist party in Nicaragua that surged out of a split from the Sandinista National Liberation Front (FSLN) in the early 1970s. Since 1985 it is officially named the Marxist–Leninist Party of Nicaragua (Partido Marxista-Leninista de Nicaragua), but the original name MAP-ML is far more known and has been used when participating in elections.

The party was founded in 1967 by pro-Chinese members of the Nicaraguan Socialist Party. When Albania broke with China, the MAP-ML followed Albania.

The party has a trade union wing, Frente Obrero (FO, Workers' Front) that was founded in 1974. The wing organized Milicias Populares Antisomocistas (MILPAS), which fought against the dictatorship of the Somoza regime. As of 1980, MAP-ML had only about 25 members, but through FO and El Pueblo, the daily newspaper of the party, it exerted much influence in the society.

One of the founders of MAP-ML, Marvin Ortega, had belonged to the national leadership of FSLN. MAP-ML built up a militant trade union activism and in urban areas had its own armed militias, Milicias Populares Antisomocistas (MILPAS). In the struggle against the Somoza regime, MILPAS forces fought under the command of the FSLN.

When the Sandinista Revolution succeeded in 1979, MAP-ML condemned it as "not a workers' but a bourgeois revolution". It organized strikes and land seizures. The Sandinistas reciprocated by disarming MILPAS and temporarily closing down El Pueblo. Several members were also imprisoned.

MAP-ML was generally critical against the mixed economy during the FSLN government. MAP-ML was the only party that voted against the Sandinista constitution in the National Assembly.

In 1984 MAP-ML was one of the parties that contested the general elections. The party got 2.1% of the votes in the parliamentary election and two seats in the national assembly. In the presidential election the MAP-ML candidate was Isidro Téllez Toruño, the general secretary of FO, and vice-presidential candidate was Juan Alberto Henríquez. Isidro and Henríquez got 11,352 votes (1%). An electoral slogan of MAP-ML was "¡Ni un voto a la burguesía! ¡Balas para el imperialismo!" ("Not one vote for the bourgeoisie! Bullets against imperialism!").

In 1985 the MAP-ML conference decided to officially change its name to Marxist–Leninist Party of Nicaragua (Partido Marxista-Leninista de Nicaragua).

MAP-ML opposed the Esquipulas Peace Agreement, which it saw as an imperialist scheme by the United States.

In the 1990 presidential election, the PMLN candidates (Isidro Téllez for president, Carlos Cuadra for vice-president) got 8,135 votes (0.6%). PMLN lost its parliamentary representation that year. PMLN lost their registration after the 1996 elections.

In the 2001 presidential elections, PMLN supported FSLN candidate Daniel Ortega.

== See also ==
- List of anti-revisionist groups
