= El Pueblo (Nicaraguan newspaper) =

Newspaper of Manuagua, Nicaragua

- Type: Daily (1979-1980), Thrice-weekly (1989), Weekly (1990)
- Format: Tabloid
- Owner(s): Cooperative
- Publisher: Frente Obrero
- Editor: Melvin Wallace
- Founded: 1979
- Political alignment: MAP-ML
- Ceased publication: 1980
- Relaunched: 1989
- Headquarters: Managua
- Circulation: ~4,000-7,000

El Pueblo ('The People') was a revolutionary newspaper published in Nicaragua. El Pueblo was the organ of Frente Obrero ('Workers Front'), the trade union wing of the Marxist–Leninist Popular Action Movement (MAP-ML). The newspaper began publication in March 1979.

Published daily, El Pueblo appealed to factory workers and university students. It was published by a cooperative. Melvin Wallace served as the editor and Carlos Cuadra was the director. El Pueblo had a circulation of around 4,000-7,000 copies.

El Pueblo was shut down briefly by the government on July 23, 1979. On January 21, 1980, the Sandinista government banned the newspaper on the grounds of having incited economic sabotage. Frente Obrero had defied government orders for restraint by organizing strikes at the San Antonio sugar mills and Monterrosa plantations. MAP-ML of being 'ultra-leftists and financed by the Communist Party of China'. On January 23, 1980, the office of El Pueblo in Managua was raided. Soldiers confiscated its printing presses and office equipment from the Sandinista Popular Army. Two journalists and one office assistant were arrested in the army raid. Various persons linked to El Pueblo were charged with counter-revolutionary activities. Wallace, Cuadra, and two Frente Obrero leaders (Isidro et al. Enríquez) were charged by the Masaya Court of Appeals on the grounds of articles published in El Pueblo issue no. One hundred fifty-nine was published on January 5, 1980 (which had argued that the Sandinista Front had reduced the price of coffee as retaliation of the plantation workers' militancy and that the government was not fulfilling its promises of land redistribution) and in issue number. One hundred seventy-nine was published on January 19, 1980 (which criticized the discourse of the national literacy campaign, arguing in favor of slogans calling for the end of latifundio). The court considered the articles as having a 'potentially destabilizing effect on the Government'.

After its closure, El Pueblo was replaced by Prensa Proletaria.

During the National Dialogue, MAP-ML demanded that the properties of El Pueblo (valued at around 300,000 U.S. dollars) be returned to them, a demand that the government accepted. El Pueblo resumed thrice-weekly publication in 1989 but was then generally not available at newsstands and bookshops. As of 1990, it was reportedly published weekly but had limited circulation.
