= Frente Obrero =

Trade union in Nicaragua

FO poster. Slogan reads 'Negotiate with the workers - not the contra!'

Frente Obrero (Spanish for 'Workers Front') (FO) was a national trade union centre in Nicaragua. It was founded c. 1972-74, as the trade union wing of the MAP-ML.

When the National Reconstruction Government was formed on July 19, 1979, FO had one of 33 representatives in the Council of State. As of 1983, it was mainly active in the construction and sugar cane sectors.

Adopting what it saw as an anti-revisionist policy on the Sandinistas, starting in 1980 strikes led by the Front occurred in the private sugar mills of San Antonio and Monterrosa, while the Front called for 100% salary increases, started a series of occupations of privately owned lands and industries, sabotaged government-led economic efforts, and advocated the development of "another civil war, this time against the Sandinista Front." Its base of support, however, gradually declined from thereon.

It was dissolved in 1986.

== See also ==
- El Pueblo
