= Culvert =

Structure to channel water past an obstacle

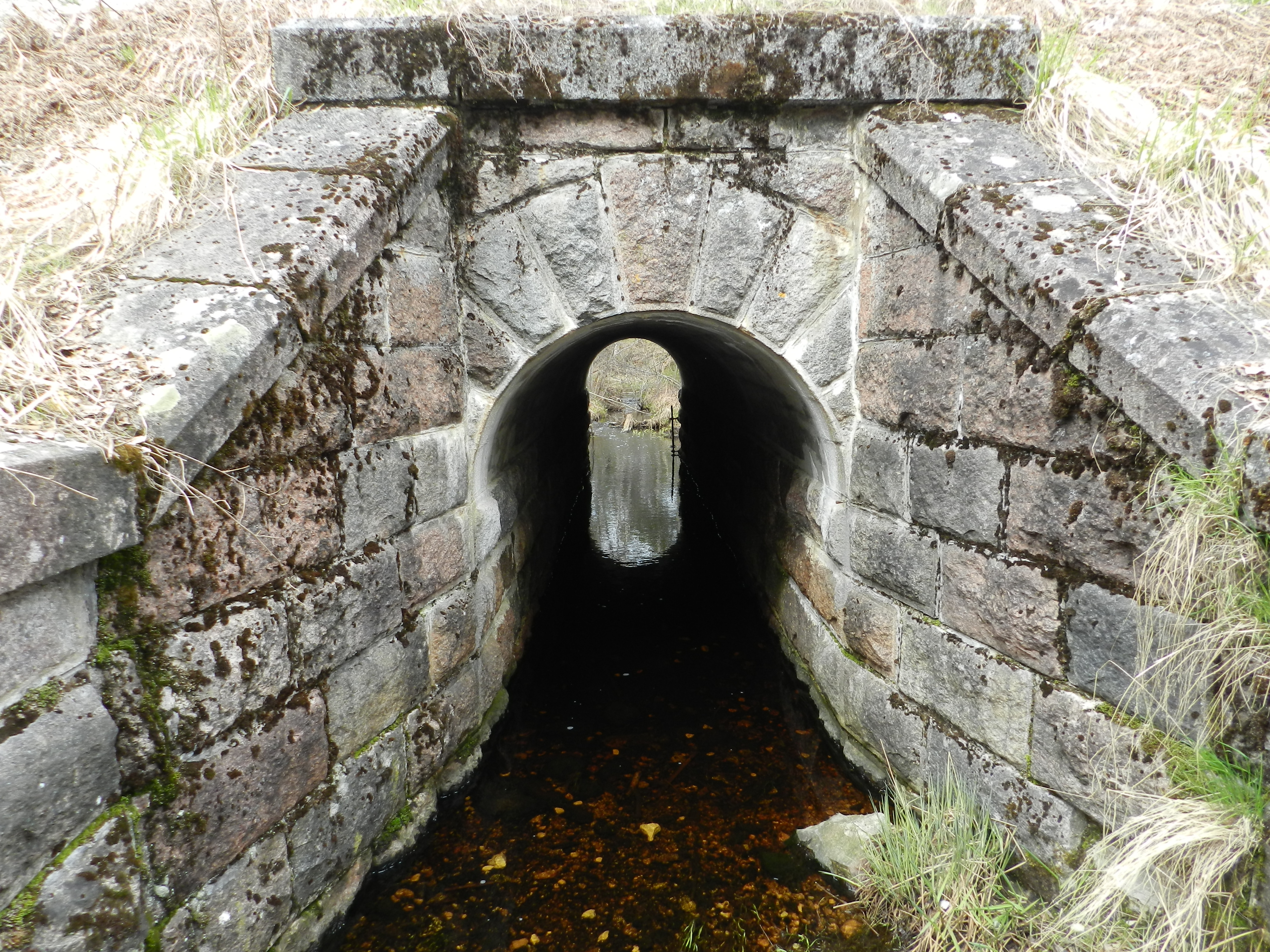
Stone culvert in Haapsalu, Estonia

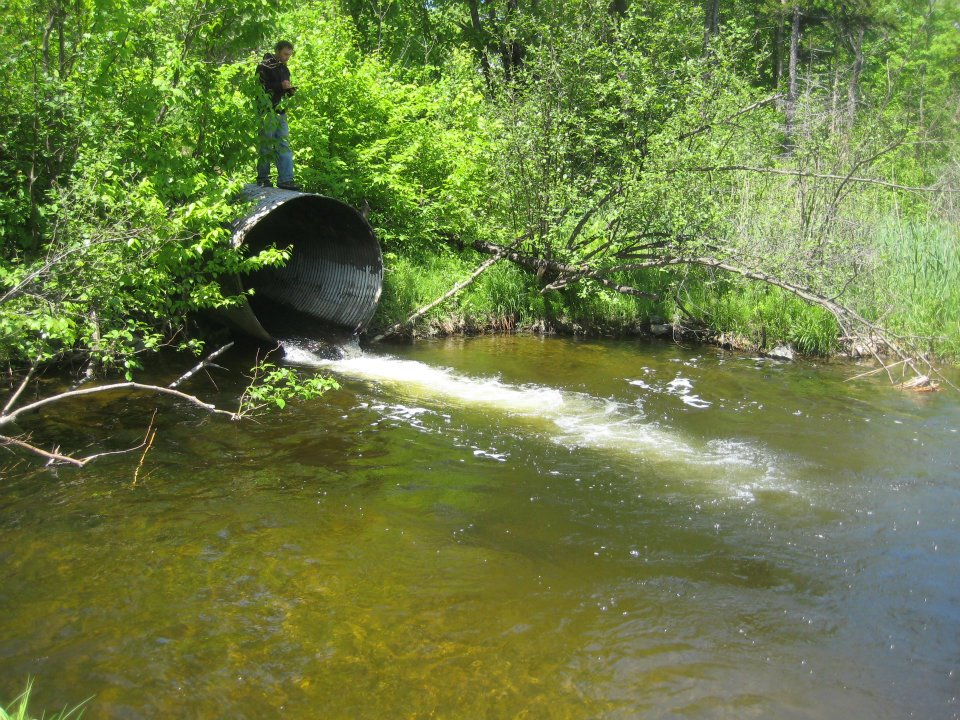
Steel culvert with a small plunge pool at its outflow

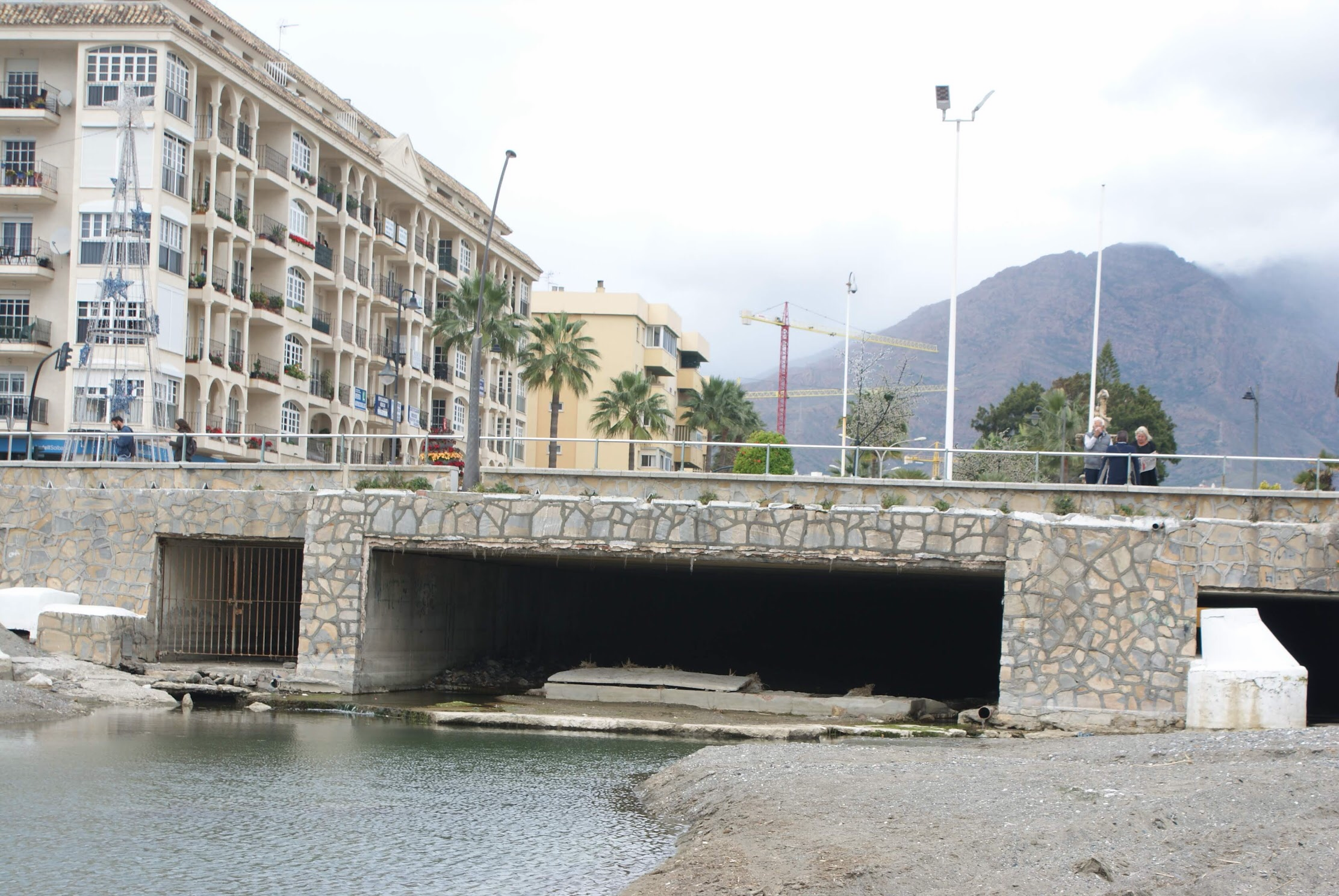
Large box culvert on Rio Monterroso

A culvert is a structure that channels water past an obstacle or to a subterranean waterway. Typically embedded so as to be surrounded by soil, a culvert may be made from a pipe, reinforced concrete or other material. In the United Kingdom, the word can also be used for a longer artificially buried watercourse.

Culverts are commonly used both as cross-drains to relieve drainage of ditches at the roadside, and to pass water under a road at natural drainage and stream crossings. When they are found beneath roads, they are frequently empty. A culvert may also be a bridge-like structure designed to allow vehicle or pedestrian traffic to cross over the waterway while allowing adequate passage for the water. Dry culverts are used to channel a fire hose beneath a noise barrier for the ease of firefighting along a highway without the need or danger of placing hydrants along the roadway itself.

Culverts come in many sizes and shapes including round, elliptical, flat-bottomed, open-bottomed, pear-shaped, and box-like constructions. The culvert type and shape selection is based on a number of factors including requirements for hydraulic performance, limitations on upstream water surface elevation, and roadway embankment height.

The process of removing culverts to restore an open-air watercourse is known as daylighting. In the UK, the practice is also known as deculverting.

== Materials ==
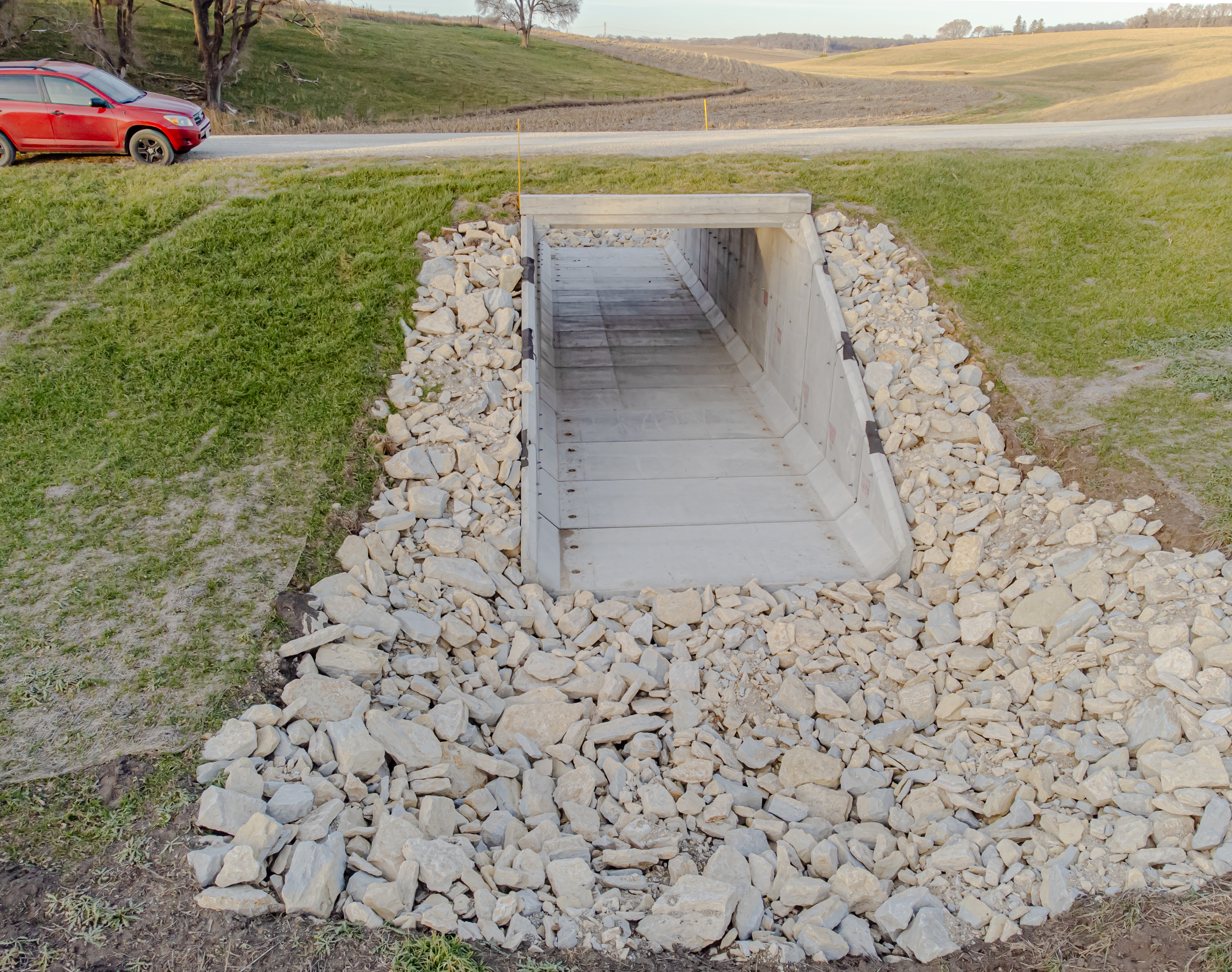
Precast concrete box culvert

Culverts can be constructed of a variety of materials including cast-in-place or precast concrete (reinforced or non-reinforced), galvanized steel, aluminum, or plastic (typically high-density polyethylene). Two or more materials may be combined to form composite structures. For example, open-bottom corrugated steel structures are often built on concrete footings.

== Design and engineering ==
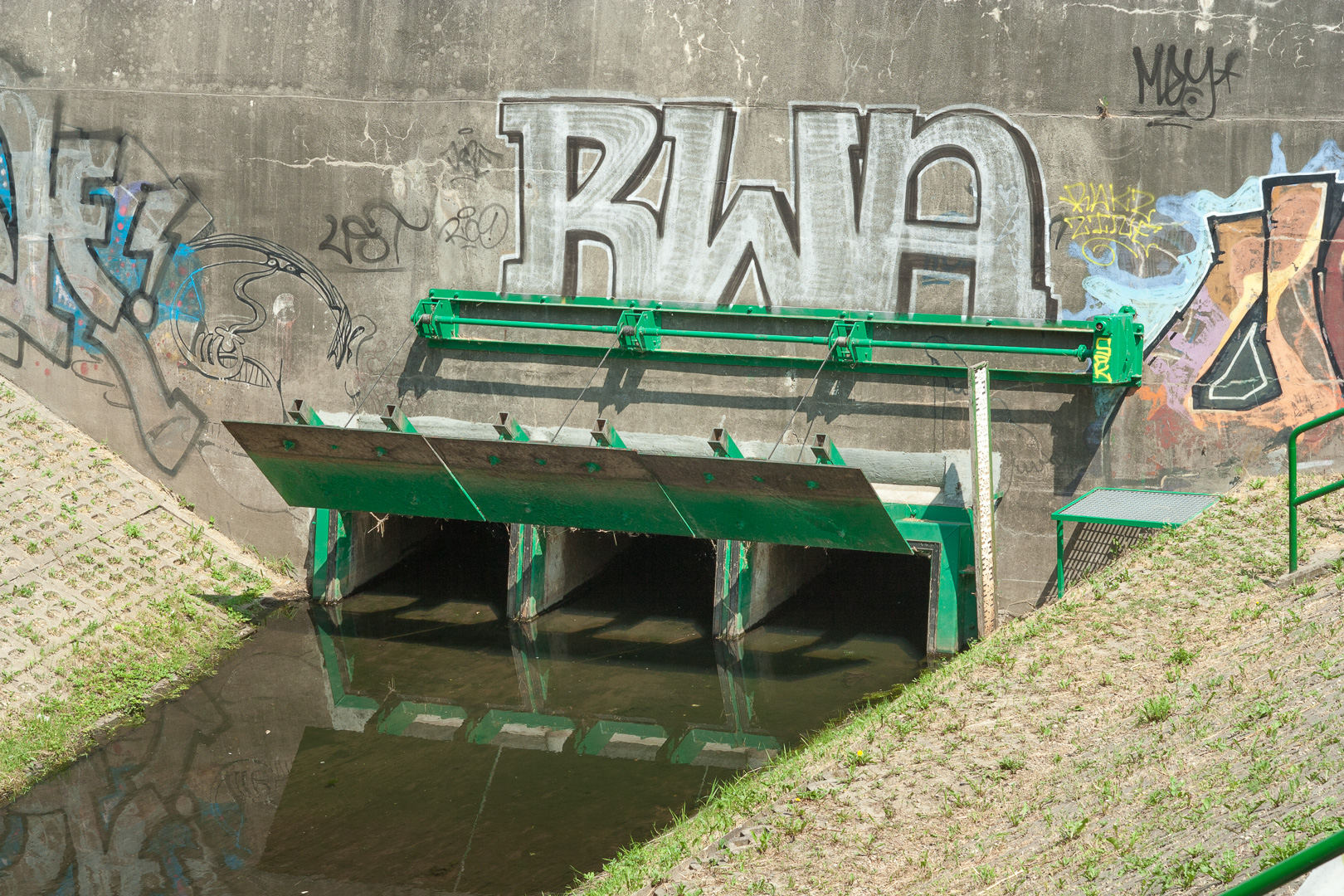
A culvert under the Vistula river levee and a street in Warsaw

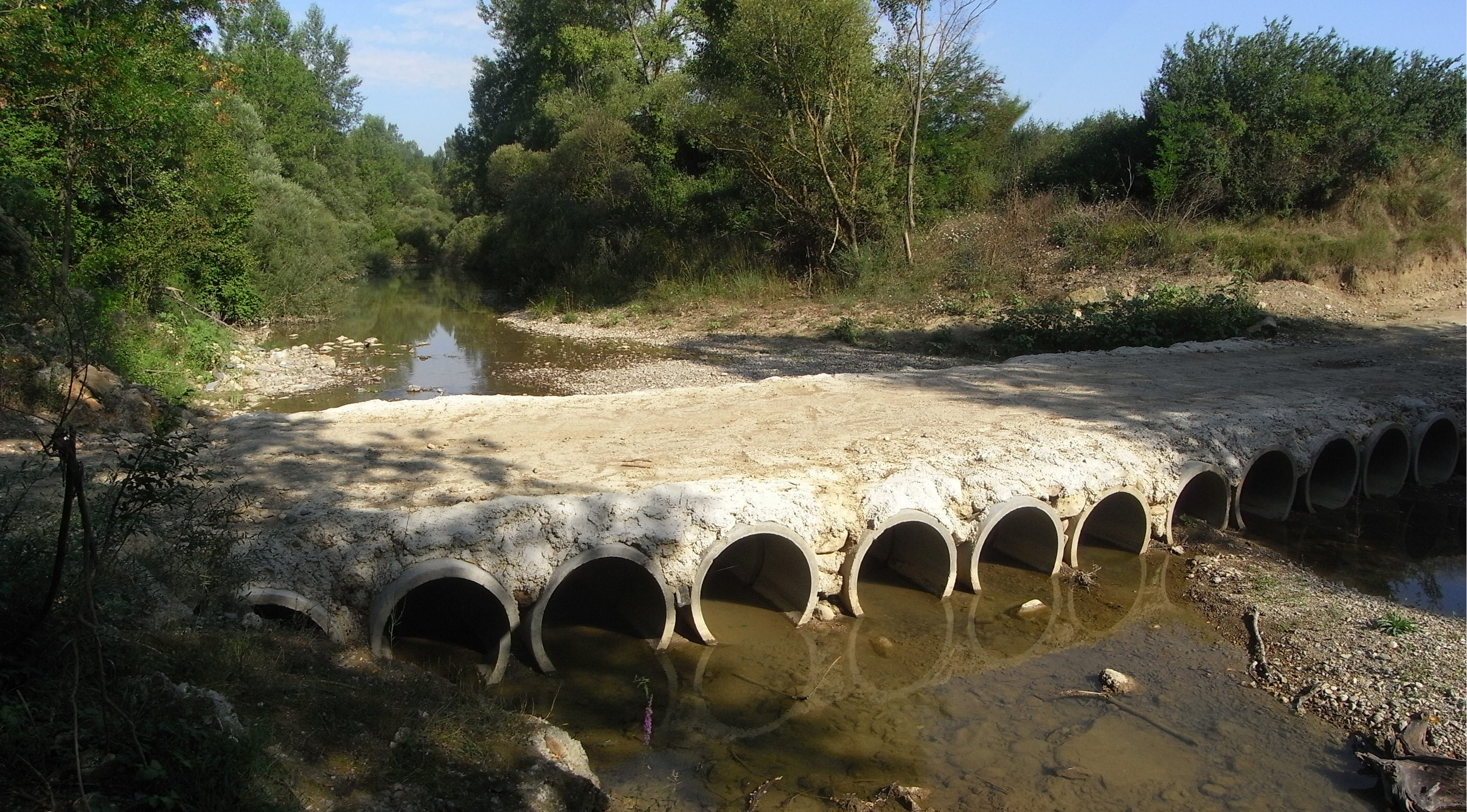
A multiple culvert assembly in Italy

Construction or installation at a culvert site generally results in disturbance of the site's soil, stream banks, or stream bed, and can result in the occurrence of unwanted problems such as scour holes or slumping of banks adjacent to the culvert structure.

Culverts must be properly sized and installed, and protected from erosion and scour. Many US agencies such as the Federal Highway Administration, Bureau of Land Management, and Environmental Protection Agency, as well as state or local authorities, require that culverts be designed and engineered to meet specific federal, state, or local regulations and guidelines to ensure proper function and to protect against culvert failures.

Culverts are classified by standards for their load capacities, water flow capacities, life spans, and installation requirements for bedding and backfill. Most agencies adhere to these standards when designing, engineering, and specifying culverts.

== Failures ==
Culvert failures can occur for a wide variety of reasons including maintenance, environmental, and installation-related failures, functional or process failures related to capacity and volume causing the erosion of the soil around or under them, and structural or material failures that cause culverts to fail due to collapse or corrosion of the materials from which they are made.

If the failure is sudden and catastrophic, it can result in injury or loss of life. Sudden road collapses are often the result of poorly designed and engineered culvert crossing sites or unexpected changes in the surrounding environment cause design parameters to be exceeded. Water passing through undersized culverts will scour away the surrounding soil over time. This can cause a sudden failure during medium-sized rain events. Accidents from culvert failure can also occur if a culvert has not been adequately sized and a flood event overwhelms the culvert, or disrupts the road or railway above it.

Ongoing culvert function without failure depends on proper design and engineering considerations being given to load, hydraulic flow, surrounding soil analysis, backfill and bedding compaction, and erosion protection. Improperly designed backfill support around culverts can result in material collapse or failure from inadequate load support.

For existing culverts which have experienced degradation, loss of structural integrity or need to meet new codes or standards, rehabilitation using a reline pipe may be preferred versus replacement. Sizing of a reline culvert uses the same hydraulic flow design criteria as that of a new culvert however as the reline culvert is meant to be inserted into an existing culvert or host pipe, reline installation requires the grouting of the annular space between the host pipe and the surface of reline pipe (typically using a low compression strength grout) so as to prevent or reduce seepage and soil migration. Grouting also serves as a means in establishing a structural connection between the liner, host pipe and soil. Depending on the size and annular space to be filled as well as the pipe elevation between the inlet and outlet, it may be necessary to add grout in multiple stages or "lifts". If multiple lifts are required, then a grouting plan is required, which should define the placement of grout feed tubes, air tubes, type of grout to be used, and if injecting or pumping grout, then the required developed pressure for injection. As the diameter of the reline pipe will be smaller than the host pipe, the cross-sectional flow area will be smaller. By selecting a reline pipe with a very smooth internal surface with an approximate Hazen-Williams Friction Factor C value of between 140–150, the decreased flow area can be offset, and hydraulic flow rates potentially increased by way of reduced surface flow resistance. Examples of pipe materials with high C-factors are high-density polyethylene (150) and polyvinyl chloride (140).

== Environmental impacts ==
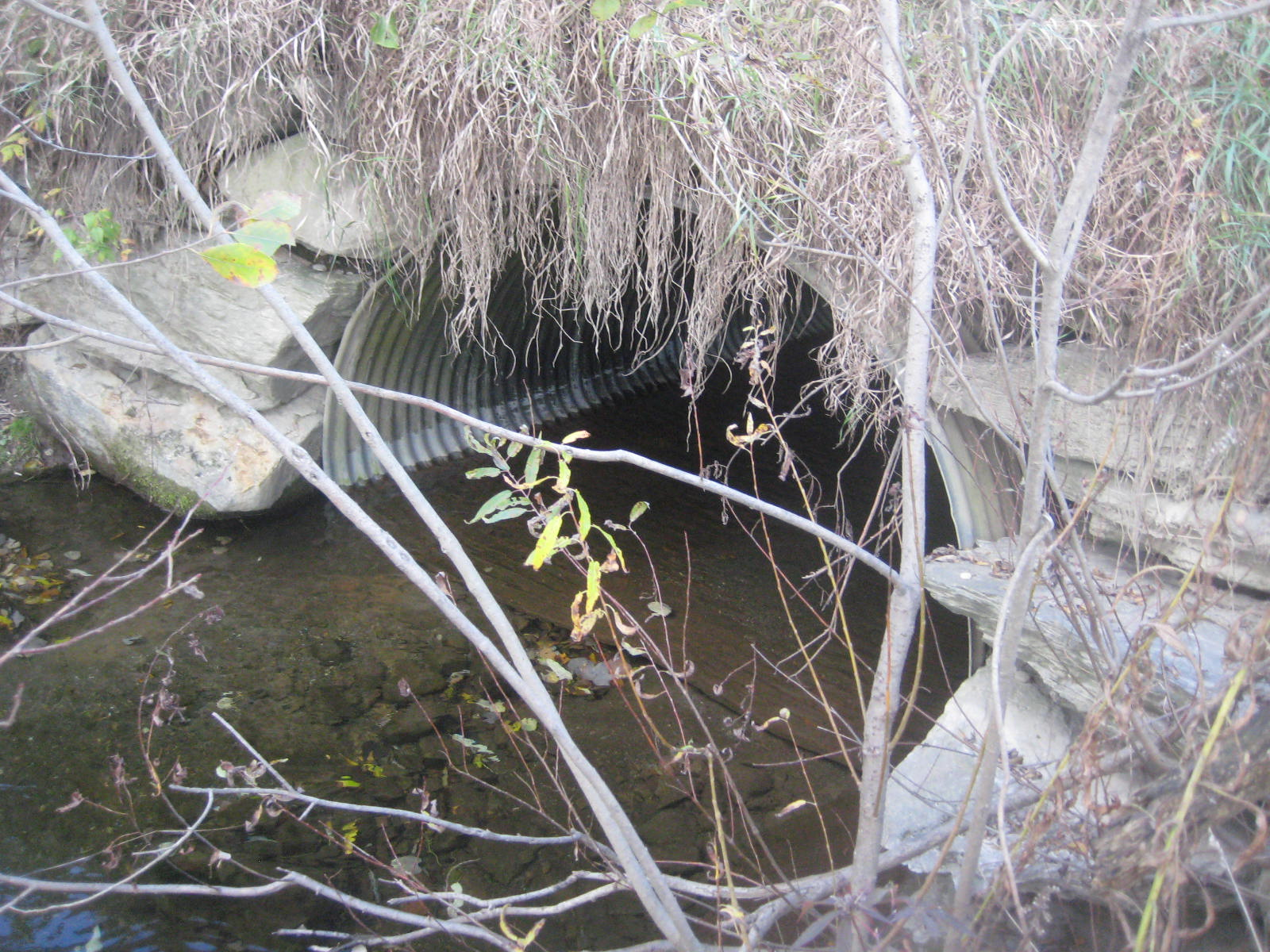
This culvert has a natural surface bottom connecting wildlife habitat.

Safe and stable stream crossings can accommodate wildlife and protect stream health, while reducing expensive erosion and structural damage. Undersized and poorly placed culverts can cause problems for water quality and aquatic organisms. Poorly designed culverts can degrade water quality via scour and erosion, as well as restrict the movement of aquatic organisms between upstream and downstream habitats. Fish are a common victim in the loss of habitat due to poorly designed crossing structures.

Culverts that offer adequate aquatic organism passage reduce impediments to movement of fish, wildlife, and other aquatic life that require instream passage. Poorly designed culverts are also more apt to become jammed with sediment and debris during medium to large scale rain events. If the culvert cannot pass the water volume in the stream, then the water may overflow the road embankment. This may cause significant erosion, ultimately washing out the culvert. The embankment material that is washed away can clog other structures downstream, causing them to fail as well. It can also damage crops and property. A properly sized structure and hard bank armoring can help to alleviate this pressure.

Culvert style replacement is a widespread practice in stream restoration. Long-term benefits of this practice include reduced risk of catastrophic failure and improved fish passage. If best management practices are followed, short-term impacts on the aquatic biology are minimal.

=== Fish passage ===
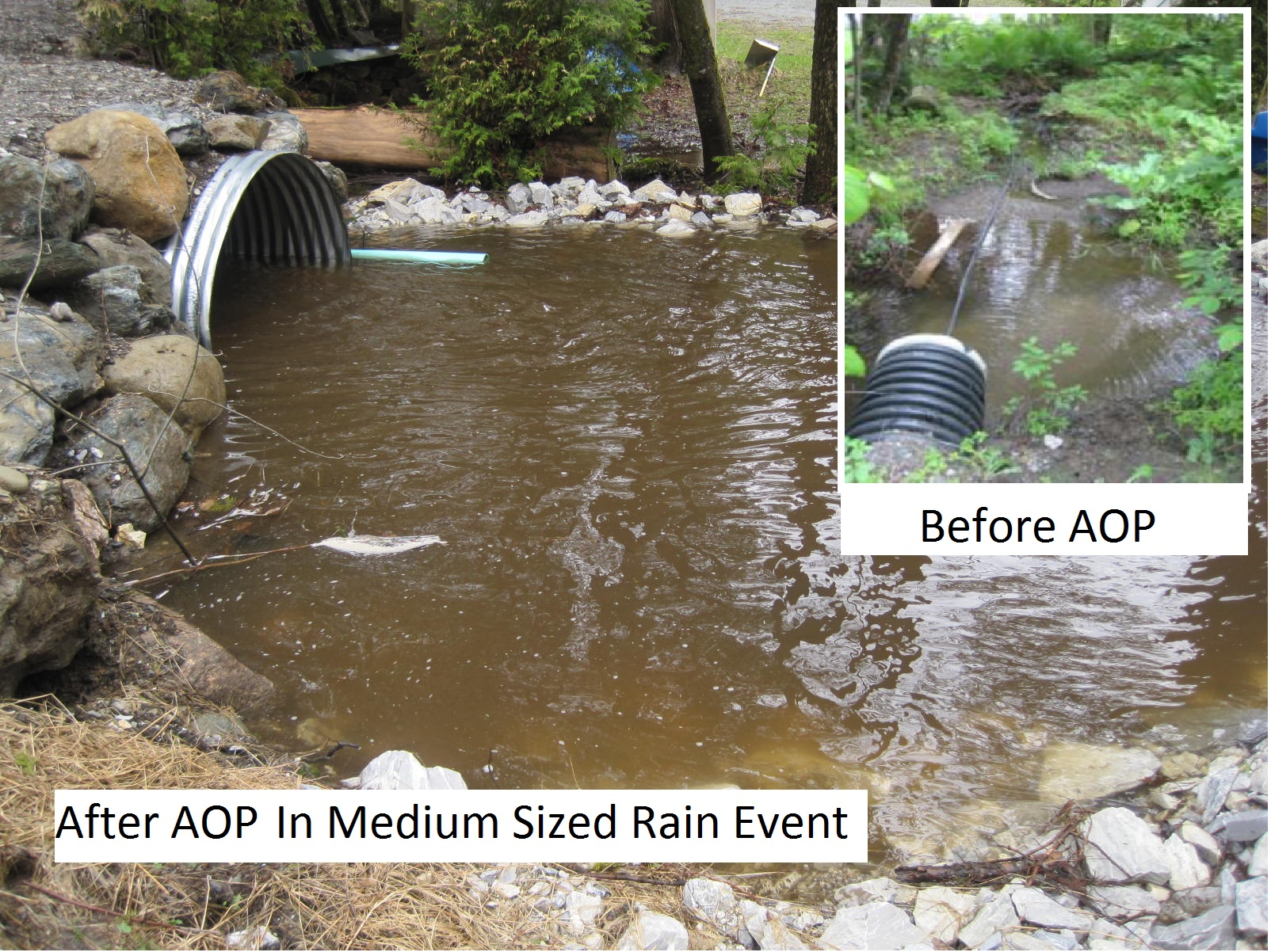
Aquatic organism passage compatible culvert replacement in Franklin, Vermont, just upstream from Lake Carmi

While the culvert discharge capacity derives from hydrological and hydraulic engineering considerations, this results often in large velocities in the barrel, creating a possible fish passage barrier. Critical culvert parameters in terms of fish passage are the dimensions of the barrel, particularly its length, cross-sectional shape, and invert slope. The behavioural response by fish species to culvert dimensions, light conditions, and flow turbulence may play a role in their swimming ability and culvert passage rate. There is no simple technical means to ascertain the turbulence characteristics most relevant to fish passage in culverts, but it is understood that the flow turbulence plays a key role in fish behaviour.

The interactions between swimming fish and vortical structures involve a broad range of relevant length and time scales. Recent discussions emphasised the role of secondary flow motion, considerations of fish dimensions in relation to the spectrum of turbulence scales, and the beneficial role of turbulent structures provided that fish are able to exploit them.

The current literature on culvert fish passage focuses mostly on fast-swimming fish species, but a few studies have argued for better guidelines for small-bodied fish including juveniles. Finally, a solid understanding of turbulence typology is a basic requirement for any successful hydraulic structure design conducive of upstream fish passage.

== Minimum energy loss culverts ==
In the coastal plains of Queensland, Australia, torrential rains during the wet season place a heavy demand on culverts. The natural slope of the flood plains is often very small, and little fall (or head loss) is permissible in the culverts. Researchers developed and patented the design procedure of minimum energy loss culverts which yield small afflux.

A minimum energy loss culvert or waterway is a structure designed with the concept of minimum head loss. The flow in the approach channel is contracted through a streamlined inlet into the barrel where the channel width is minimum, and then it is expanded in a streamlined outlet before being finally released into the downstream natural channel. Both the inlet and the outlet must be streamlined to avoid significant form losses. The barrel invert is often lowered to increase the discharge capacity.

The concept of minimum energy loss culverts was developed by a shire engineer in Victoria and a professor at the University of Queensland during the late 1960s. While a number of small-size structures were designed and built in Victoria, some major structures were designed, tested and built in south-east Queensland.

== See also ==
- Bridge – Structure built to span physical obstacles
- Brook (stream) – Small natural stream
- Clapper bridge – Bridge formed by large flat slabs of stone
- Culvert Cat – A mountain lion nicknamed after his ability to use a culvert to cross a freeway
- Storm drain – Infrastructure for draining excess rain and ground water from impervious surfaces
- Fish ladder – Structure to allow fish to migrate upriver around barriers
- Low-water crossing – Roadway usable only at low water levels
- Sanitary sewer – Underground pipe for transporting sewage
- Sough – Underground channel for water drainage
- Subterranean river – River that runs wholly or partly beneath the ground surface
