= Monte Rosso (Colli Euganei) =

Mountain in Italy

Coordinates: 45°22′13″N 11°45′05″E

Highest point
- Elevation: 174 m (571 ft)

Geography
- Location: Veneto, Italy

Monte Rosso (Colli Euganei) is a mountain of the Veneto, Italy. It has an elevation of 174 metres.

According to legend, Monte Rosso was first settled by Antenor, a refugee from the Trojan War, and historically by the nobility of Padua.
