= Abdalajís Tunnel =

Railway tunnel in Spain

Coordinates: 36.9389°N 4.7303°W

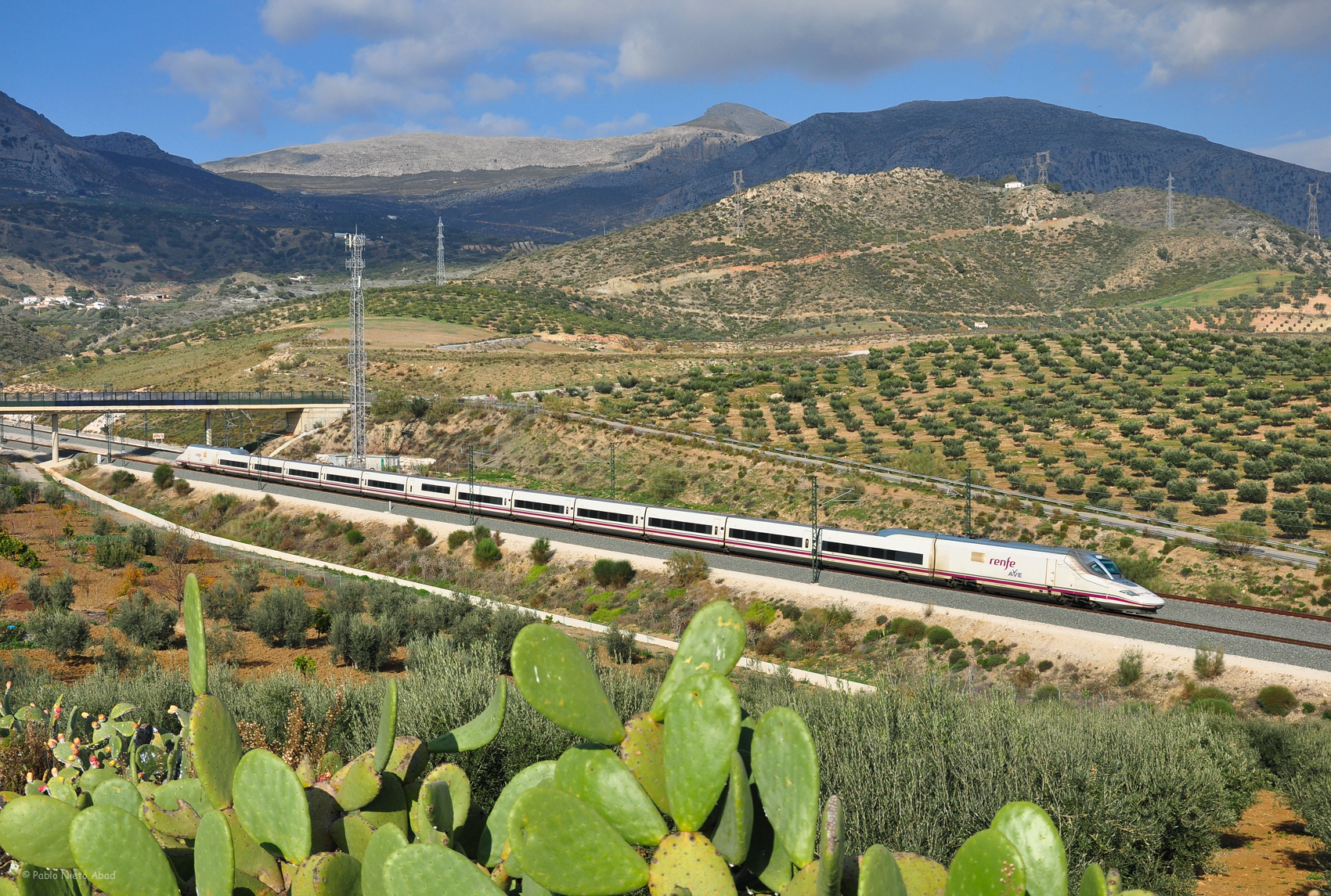
Renfe S-112 leaving the tunnel of Abdalajis a few minutes to get to Malaga from Barcelona.

The Abdalajís Tunnel is a railway tunnel that forms part of the Madrid–Málaga high-speed rail line as it crosses the Cordillera Penibética mountains. At a length of 8,970-metre (29,430 ft), it is the fourth-longest operational railway tunnel in Spain. Its completion in 2009 facilitated high speed trains to travel between the cities of Madrid and Málaga in roughly two hours and 20 minutes.

Excavation of the Abdalajís Tunnel commenced during November 2003. Progress was initially quick, but suffered several stoppages on account of methane gas, geological instability, and water ingress. The construction was controversial, in part due to its impact on an aquifer and disruption to local water supplies. Work proceeded through to breakthrough in early 2006; three years later, the Abdalajís Tunnel was opened to traffic for the first time. Monitoring of the tunnel's condition and that of the surrounding geology has continued into its operational life, along with routine inspections to ensure its condition.

== Construction ==
During the 2000s, Spain undertook a substantial expansion of its AVE high speed rail network as part of a plan to bring all major cities within four hours travel time from Madrid. One such new-build railway was the Madrid–Málaga high-speed rail line between the major cities of Córdoba, Madrid, Seville, and Málaga. Of the various civil engineering works, including numerous viaducts and tunnels, the 8,970-metre (29,430 ft) long Abdalajis Tunnel is perhaps the most substantial single element. This was in part due to the local geological conditions present, which is composed of various materials, including clay, anhydrite, karst, which exhibited unfavourable heterogeneous mechanical behavior for tunnelling. Thus, it was recognised that multiple solutions would have to be employed in its construction, including the use of reinforcement rings along with accompanying waterproofing features for a length of 1,100m in each tube.

During 2001, the state-owned railway infrastructure organisation Gestor de Infraestructuras Ferroviarias (GiF) awarded separate construction contracts for each of the Abdalajís Tunnel's twin bores. The eastern tunnel was awarded to a Dragados-led consortium, Ute Abdalajis, while the western tunnel was awarded to the consortium Ute Abdalajis Oueste, formed by Sacyr and Somague-Engenharia. Both consortiums shared the main portal site and employed nearly identical double shield tunnel boring machines (TBMs) to perform the majority of the excavation work. The use of the customised double-shield TBM solution was reportedly due to the expectation of delivering higher production rates and superior steerability, particularly when traversing weak ground formations. During November 2003, excavation activity commenced on the eastern bore.

The rate of advance was relatively quick for the first 1,590 m (5,217 ft), occasionally covering as much as 34 m (112 ft) in a single day. However, in the middle point of the excavation phase encountered numerous difficulties, including dangerous intrusions of gases such as methane, which forced a complete stoppage while the bore was ventilated to dissipate the threat of explosion. To help mitigate against further incidents, modifications to the site's ventilation system were performed to more quickly remove any excess gas present. Further disruption was caused by an underground collapse, caused by the surrounding rock having been destabilised. These events negatively impacted the tunnel's rate of production rate, but did not cause any lengthy interruptions in the process.

The Abdalajís Tunnel was subject of considerable criticism and controversy during its construction, with several protests over its environmental impact being held. Considerable amounts of water had leaked into the tunnel during its construction, to the extent that local springs ran dry and water supplies were disrupted for several days. According to the journal Environmental Geology, the drilling activity had come into contact with an underground aquifer, after which remedial measures were enacted prior to the tunnel's completion; the natural equilibrium was forecast to recover as it is replenished by rainfall over time.

During January 2006, it was announced that breakthrough had occurred in the eastern bore, a key milestone in the tunnel's construction. Two and a half months later, breakthrough was achieved in the western bore of the Abdalajís Tunnel, after which the fitting-out phase commenced. A specialised drainage solution was deployed, referred to as the Multiple Measurement and Drainage Device (MMDD), which measures the hydrostatic load over the tunnel lining and any flow variations from the drainage system. Permeability tests were conducted to prove the integrity of the tunnel walls.

== Operations ==
While the AVE Class 102, a high speed passenger train, is not typically subject to any speed restriction while traversing tunnels, and the Abdalajís Tunnel's curvature radius of 6900m can theoretically support trains without tilting technology travelling at speeds of up to 392 km/h, trains nonetheless reduce their speeds from 300 km/h to 160 km/h prior to entering the Abdalajís and Gobantes Tunnels. Once Málaga-bound trains have passed through these two tunnels, they accelerate up to 300 km/h again for the Espinazo and Jévar viaducts and the shorter Álora, El Espartal, Tevilla, Gibralmora, and Cártama tunnels.

Geological monitoring of the Abdalajís Tunnel via 2,200 individual on-site sensors continued for numerous years following its opening. During March 2018, it was announced that ADIF, in light of concerns raised over the tunnel's stability, had sought specialist assistance to survey and analyse the whole length of the tunnel; it is believed that regular inspections shall be necessary as well.
