= José Benito Monterroso =

Uruguayan priest (1788-1838)

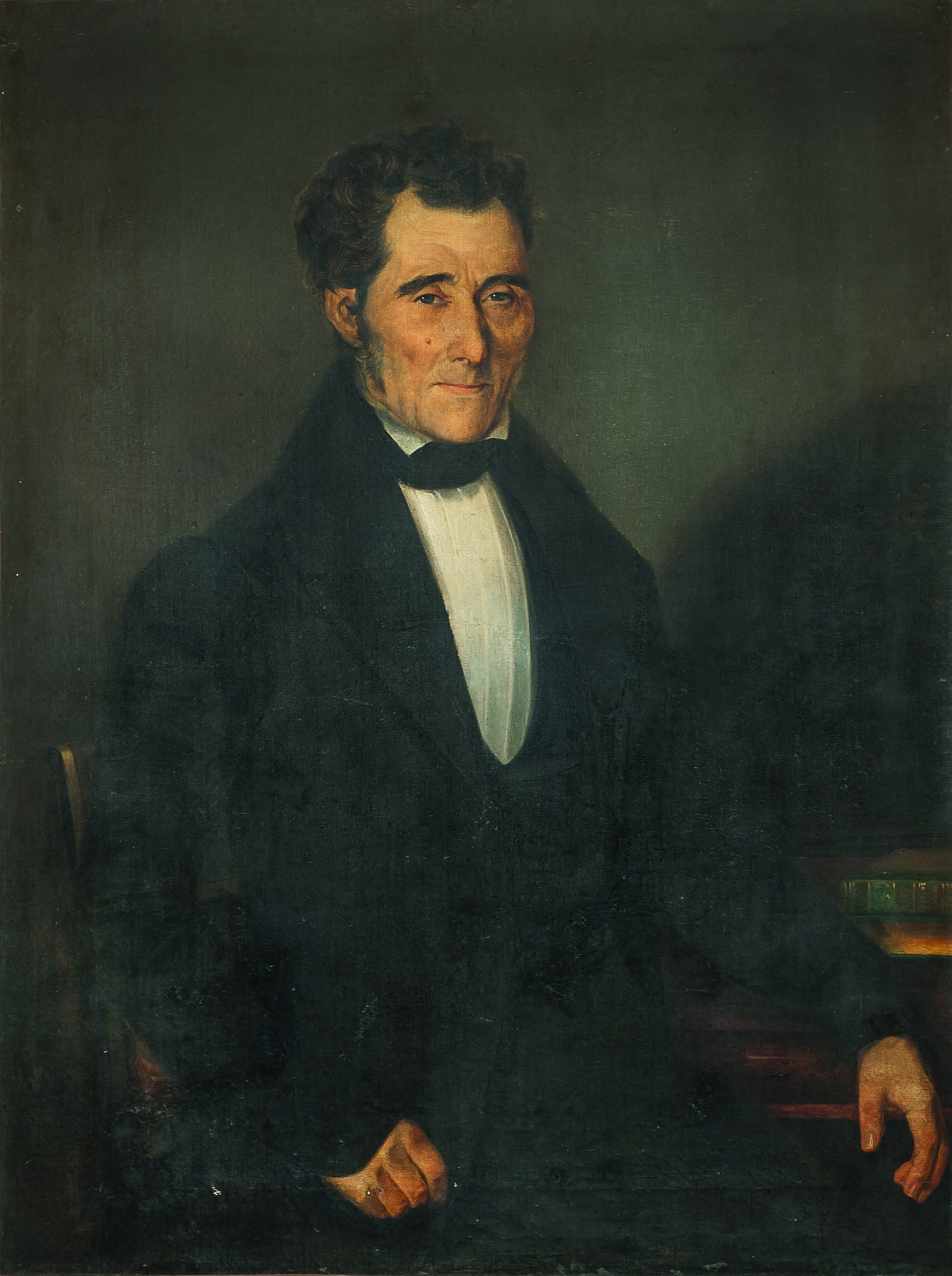

Personal life
- Born: 1788 Montevideo
- Died: 1838 (aged 49–50)
- Known for: Patriot during the fight for freedom in colonial times

Religious life
- Religion: Christianity
- Denomination: Roman Catholic
- Order: Franciscan Order
- Philosophy: Artiguism

José Benito Silverio Monterroso Bermúdez (1788, in Montevideo – 1838) was a Roman Catholic priest from the Banda Oriental, the pre-independence name of Uruguay.

He was ordained in the Franciscan Order and later became lecturer in Philosophy and Theology at the University of Córdoba.

== Uruguayan independence-era patriot ==
He was a notable patriot during the fight for freedom in colonial times. He was decisive in the development of Artiguism, the thought of José Gervasio Artigas.

=== Family background ===
Monterroso was the eldest of six. His sister Ana married Juan Antonio Lavalleja, leader of the Thirty-Three Orientals.
