= Ana Monterroso de Lavalleja =

Uruguayan patriot (1791–1858)

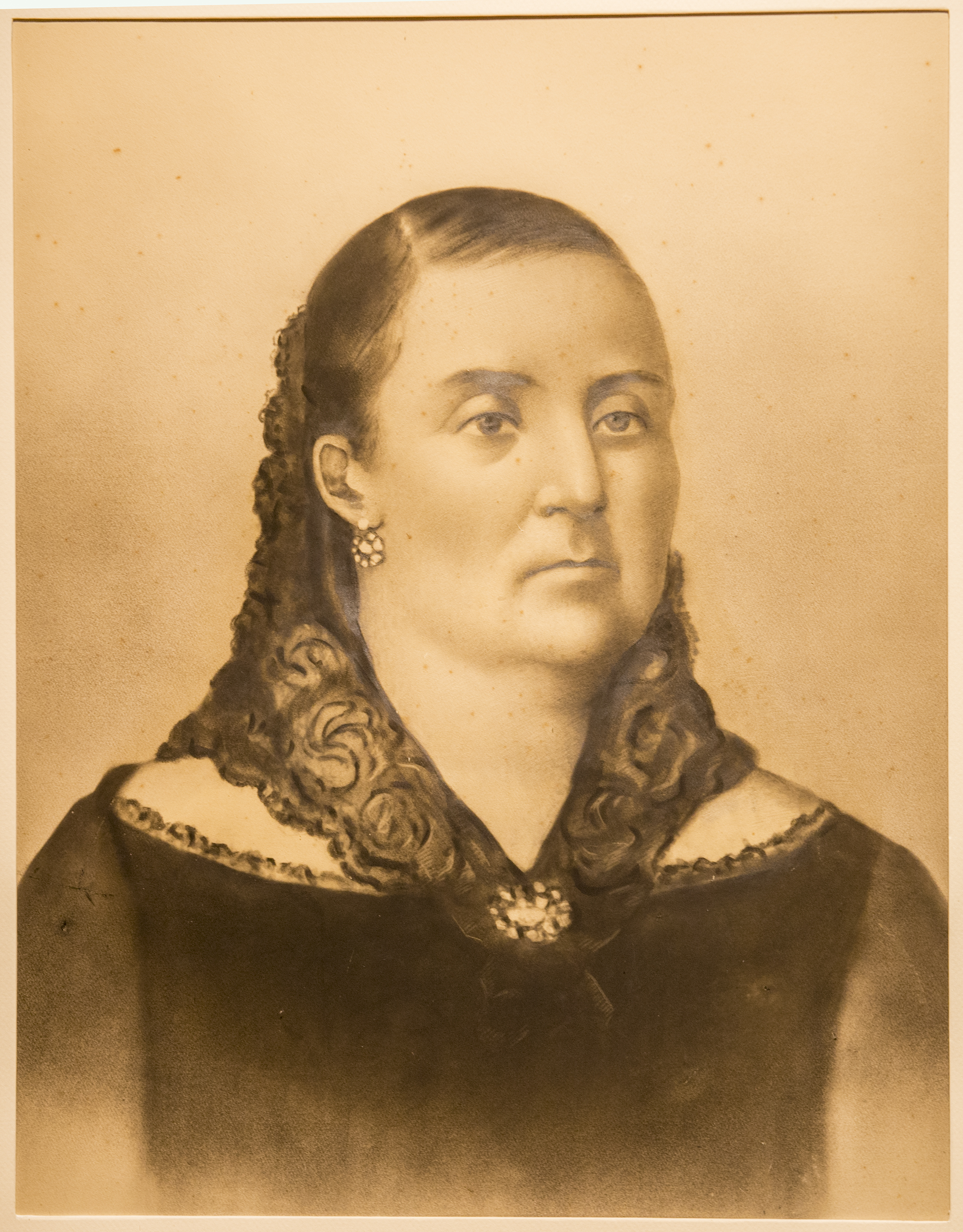
- Born: Ana Micaela Monterroso y Bermúdez; 3 September 1791; Montevideo, Viceroyalty of the Río de la Plata, Spanish Empire
- Died: 28 March 1858 (aged 66); Montevideo, Uruguay
- Spouse: Juan Antonio Lavalleja (m. 1817; died 1853)
- Children: 10
- Relatives: José Benito Monterroso (brother)

Ana Micaela Monterroso de Lavalleja (3 September 1791 – 28 March 1858) was a Uruguayan woman, the wife of Juan Antonio Lavalleja, who traveled with him and participated in the politics of the world around her. Whether or not Lavalleja was present in the household, Monterroso ran the family's affairs and would actively aid the resistance to the Portuguese and the government of Fructuoso Rivera. She and Lavalleja had ten children, some of whom died young. She, along with Melchora Cuenca and Cayetana Leguizamón, represent the involvement of women in the early history of modern Uruguay.

== Biography ==
On 3 September 1791, a few meters from the San Pedro Pedro of Montevideo on what is now Sarandí street, Ana Monterroso de Lavalleja was born. Her father, Marcos José da Porta, was an immigrant from the Galicia region of Spain who became a merchant and alderman who championed the rights of the poor and her mother was Juana Paula Bermúdez Artigas, a cousin of José Gervasio Artigas and secretary of Miguel Barreiro. She was born in a time of change for Uruguay and Montevido, seeing in her youth the construction of the Montevideo Cabildo and the Montevideo Metropolitan Cathedral and the demolition of the old city walls. Monterroso's family, supportive of the Independence movement, included six brothers, one of whom was José Benito Monterroso, who would closely collaborate with Artigas.

On 21 October 1817, Monterroso married Juan Antonio Lavalleja, then still a divisional commander under Colonel Fructuoso Rivera, in the Uruguayan village of Florida. They were wed by proxy, as Lavalleja was at the time leading troops against the Portuguese in the Portuguese conquest of the Banda Oriental. the Lavallejas were captured by the Portuguese under Carlos Frederico Lecor in Salto and imprisoned in Rio de Janeiro until the end of the war. In this time, Monterroso involved herself in the politics of the time, delivering and managing Uruguayan correspondence in resistance to the Portuguese.

== Legacy ==
In July 2017, Rosana Carrete, Director of Cabildo Historical Museum in Montevideo, debuted an exhibit dedicated to the women of the Uruguayan revolution, including Monterroso.
