= Merindad de Valdeporres =

Municipality in Castile and León, Spain

Coordinates: 43°01′14″N 03°46′7″W

- municipality
- Coat of arms
- Interactive map of Merindad de Valdeporres
- Country: Spain
- Autonomous community: Castile and León
- Province: Burgos
- Comarca: Las Merindades
- Seat: Pedrosa de Valdeporres

Area
  - Total: 120 km^{2} (46 sq mi)
- Elevation: 690 m (2,260 ft)

Population (2025-01-01)
  - Total: 412
  - Density: 3.4/km^{2} (8.9/sq mi)
- Time zone: UTC+1 (CET)
  - Summer (DST): UTC+2 (CEST)
- Postal code: 09574
- Website: http://www.merindaddevaldeporres.es/

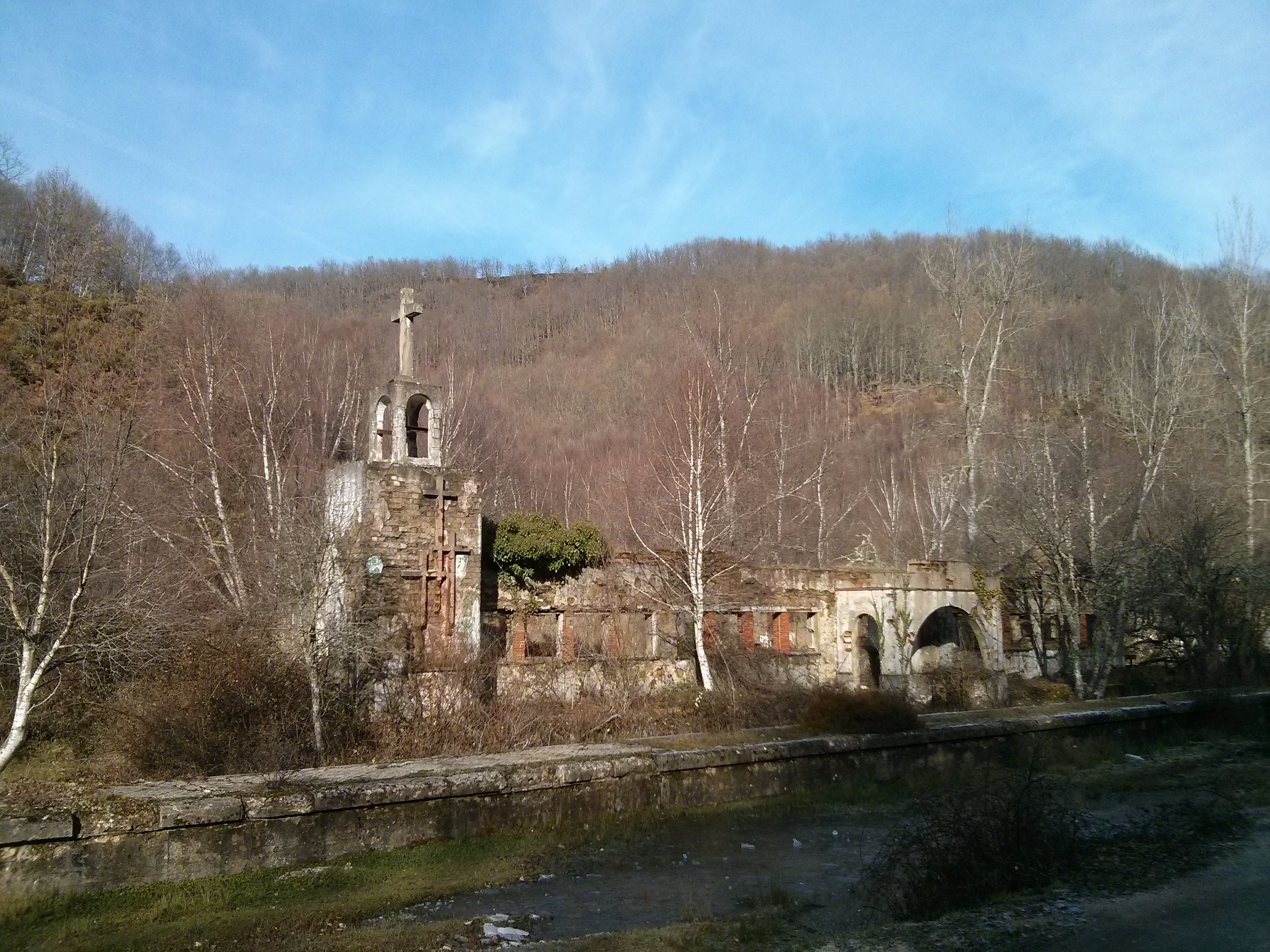
Merindad de Valdeporres

Merindad de Valdeporres is a municipality located in the province of Burgos, Castile and León, Spain. According to the 2022 census (INE), the municipality has a population of 413 inhabitants. Its seat is in Pedrosa de Valdeporres.
