= Rio Monterroso =

Monterroso River
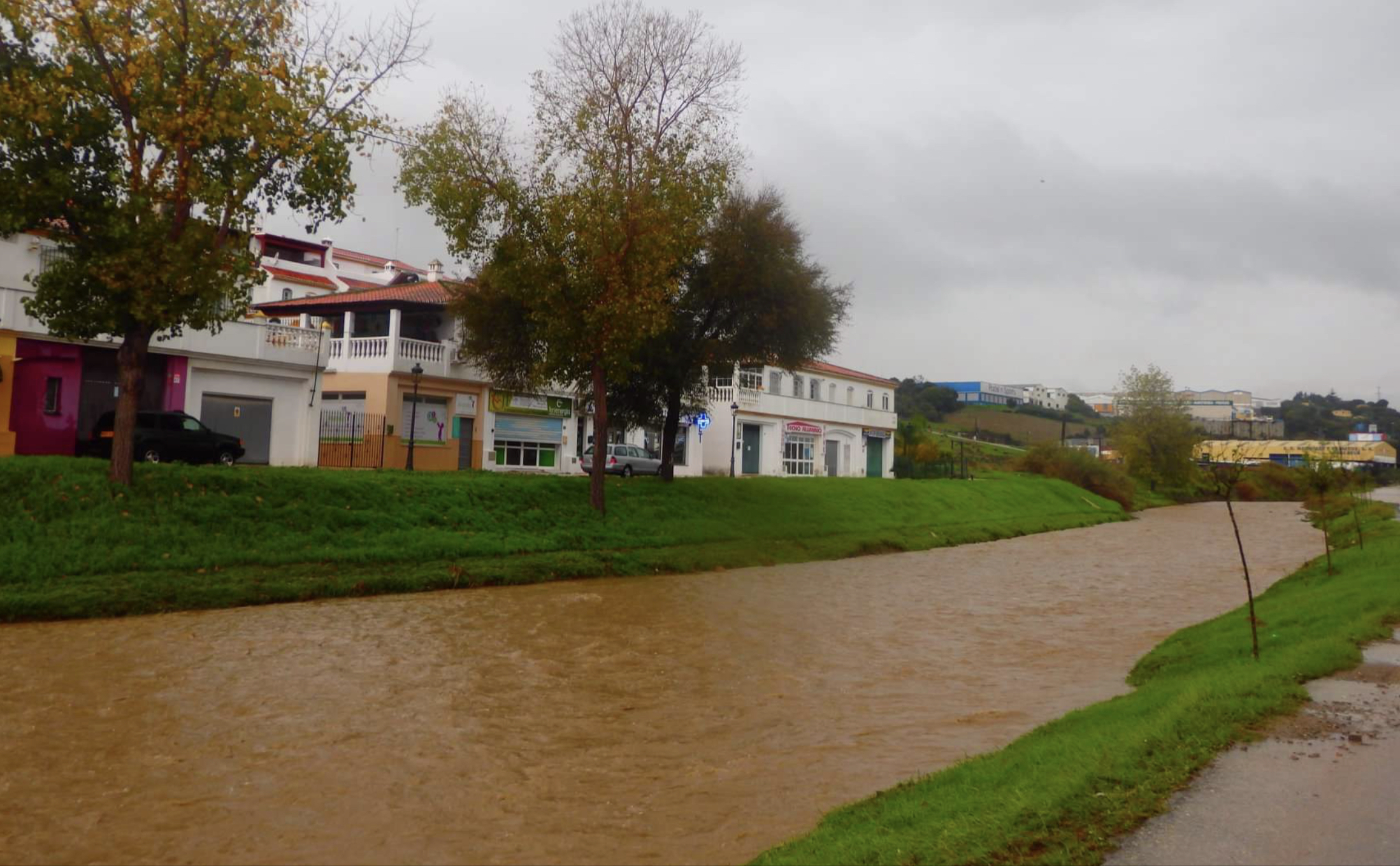
- River Monterroso during rain
- Native name: Rio Monterroso (Spanish)

Location
- Countries: Spain, etc

Physical characteristics
- Mouth: Mediterranean Sea
  - location: Estepona, Spain

The Monterroso River (Rio Monterroso or Arroyo Monterroso) is a seasonal river that flows from the Sierra Bermeja mountains to Estepona, Andalusia, Spain, where it empties into the Mediterranean Sea. It remains dry through the average summer weather and flows during the winter rainy season depending on the amount of rain.

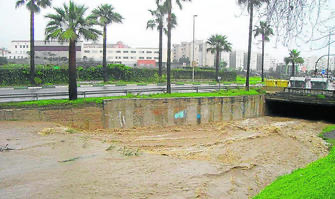
River monterroso culvert inlet

The river was originally culverted on the coast of Estepona in the 1960s for use as the paseo maritimo. However, a much larger culvert was constructed in the 1970s. It runs underground in the city of Estepona, beginning at Calle Monterroso.

On January 12, 1973, the dossiers were signed to construct the modern rectangular Monterroso Culvert. Construction started in April 1973 and ended in June 1974. It took 14 months (430 d) to complete. The name of the work was "Embovedado del arroyo Monterroso" and the construction company was Construcciones Civiles, S. A.

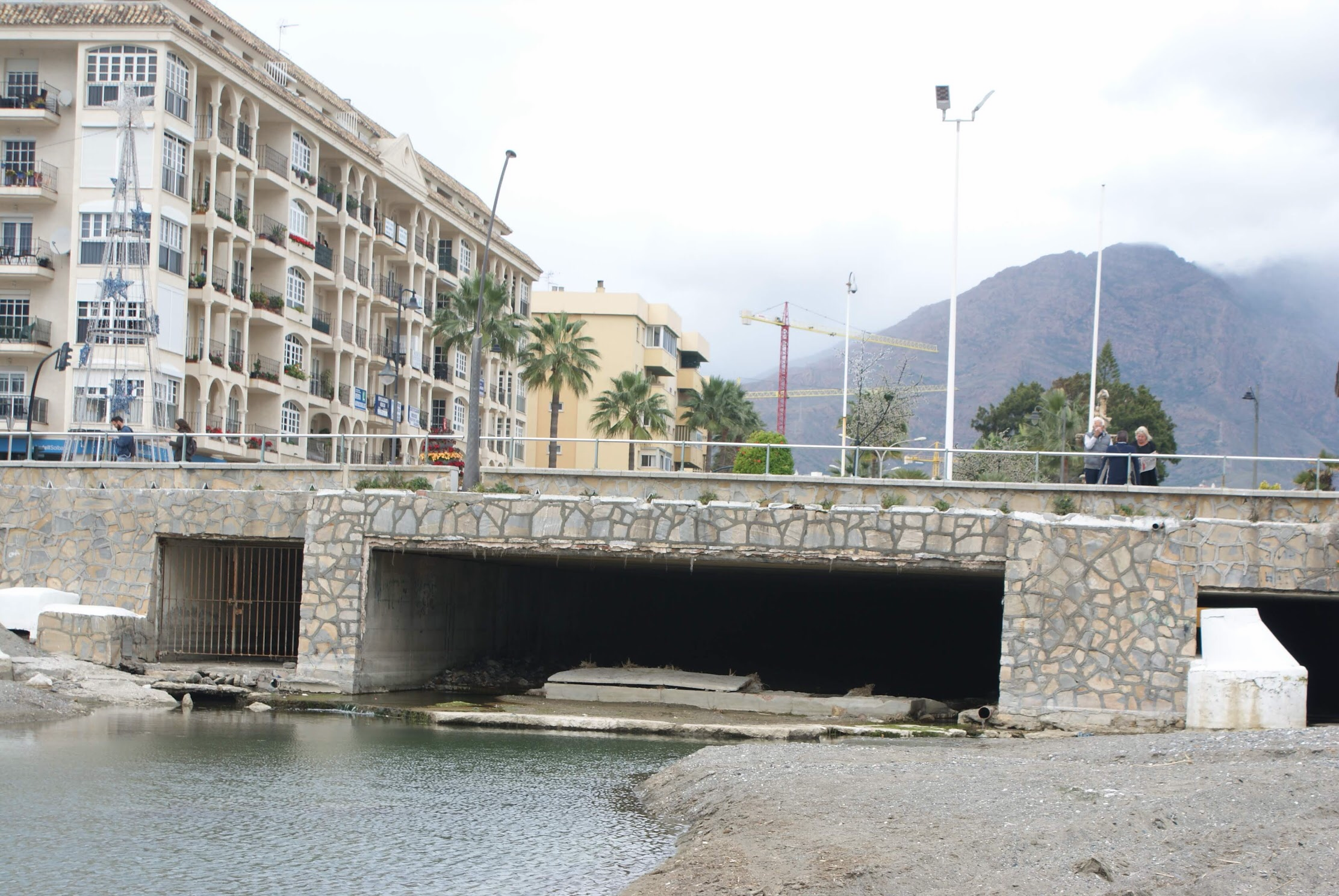

The culvert is located directly under Av. Juan Carlos I, the main road in Estepona. The outfall of the culvert is located on the southern end of the Av. Juan Carlos I. The river culvert was constructed to form the Av. Juan Carlos I. The culvert is 1.16 kilometres (0.72 mi) in length, has a span of 11 metres (36 ft) and a rise of 2.61 metres (8.6 ft).

The construction of the Monterroso river culvert had a base budget of 55,105,234 Pesetas, The bid price on March 29, 1973, was 51,247,869 Pesetas.

On October 11, 1986, the separate 1960s culvert that the Monterroso river flowed through via the newer culvert collapsed. A sewage treatment truck was engulfed, but the operator managed to get out in time. The collapse created a 700 square metre sinkhole and sparked the construction of the rest of the culvert to engulf the original location of the collapsed bridge maintaining the shape and size of the original box culvert in 1987.

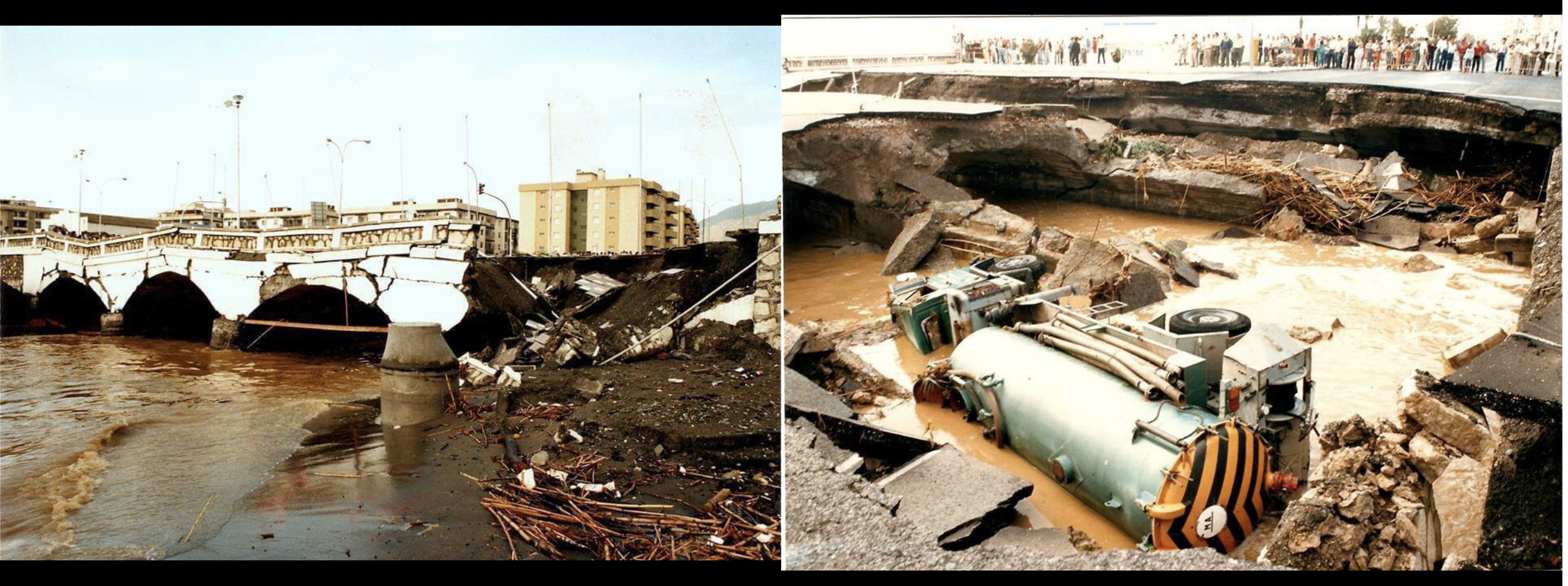
700m2 sinkhole in the River Monterroso's original culvert

As of 2015, there were plans to build a river park along the banks of a portion of the Monterroso river in Estepona.

In 2017, the plans to build the river park lacked authorization and were never instated; however, a beautification project was conducted.

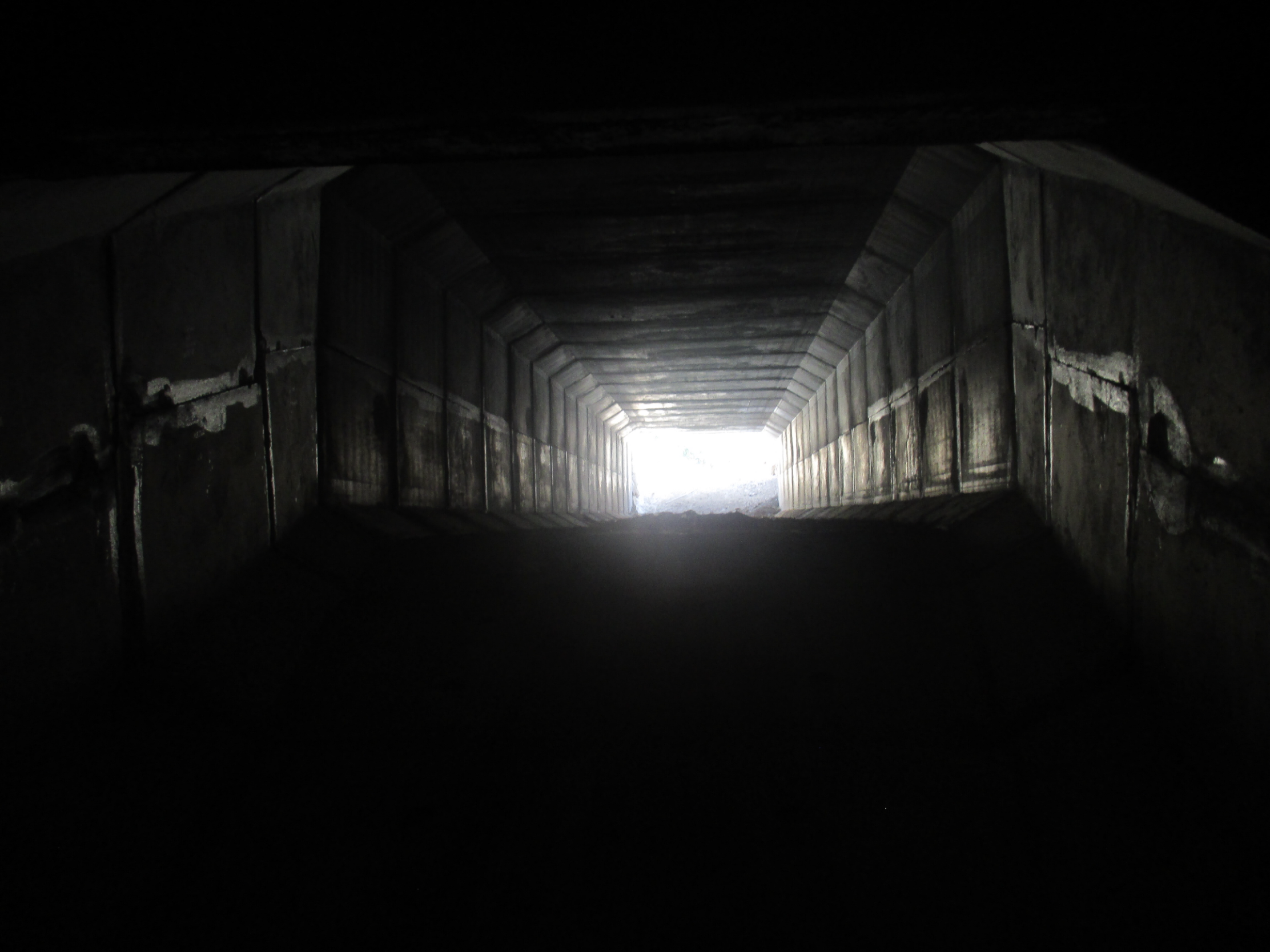
Inlet of the arroyo de juan benítez

Inside the River Monterroso culvert, the Arroyo de Juan Benítez flows in via another culvert which is also over a kilometre in length. In 2018, plans to resize a portion of the culvert were successfully completed.

The resizing was conducted by Constructions y Excavations Manzano and cost 5 million euros ($6 million) to conduct.

== Historical designs of Arroyo De Juan Benítez culvert ==
The third version of the Arroyo de Juan Benítez is located on the eastern wall of the Monterroso culvert, flowing directly under the Calle Parque central. Version 3 is the largest of all versions of arroyo de Juan Benítez culverts. This is one of 3 versions of outfalls located on the eastern wall of the Monterroso culvert. Version 3 was built to improve on version 2, which had a 90° (right angle) internal bend and caused problems with water flow. Version 3, like version 2, consists of a box culvert system for its entire length. Its mouth consists of a five foot tall rectangular concrete outfall, with ceilings that slope up to 6' 5" inside and slant to the right. This shape is prevalent in many subsurface canals and larger drainage systems using overhead vertical beams and is known as a transition structure to maximise hydraulic efficiency.

The specialised shape of these transition structures with beam-bridge structures are not only derived from the need to create a hydraulically efficient transition structure, but one that possesses the tensile strength that compensates from the lack thereof abutments, and structural supports (for main support beams to have a strong structure to rest on) and in the exiting area of laterally joining tunnels.

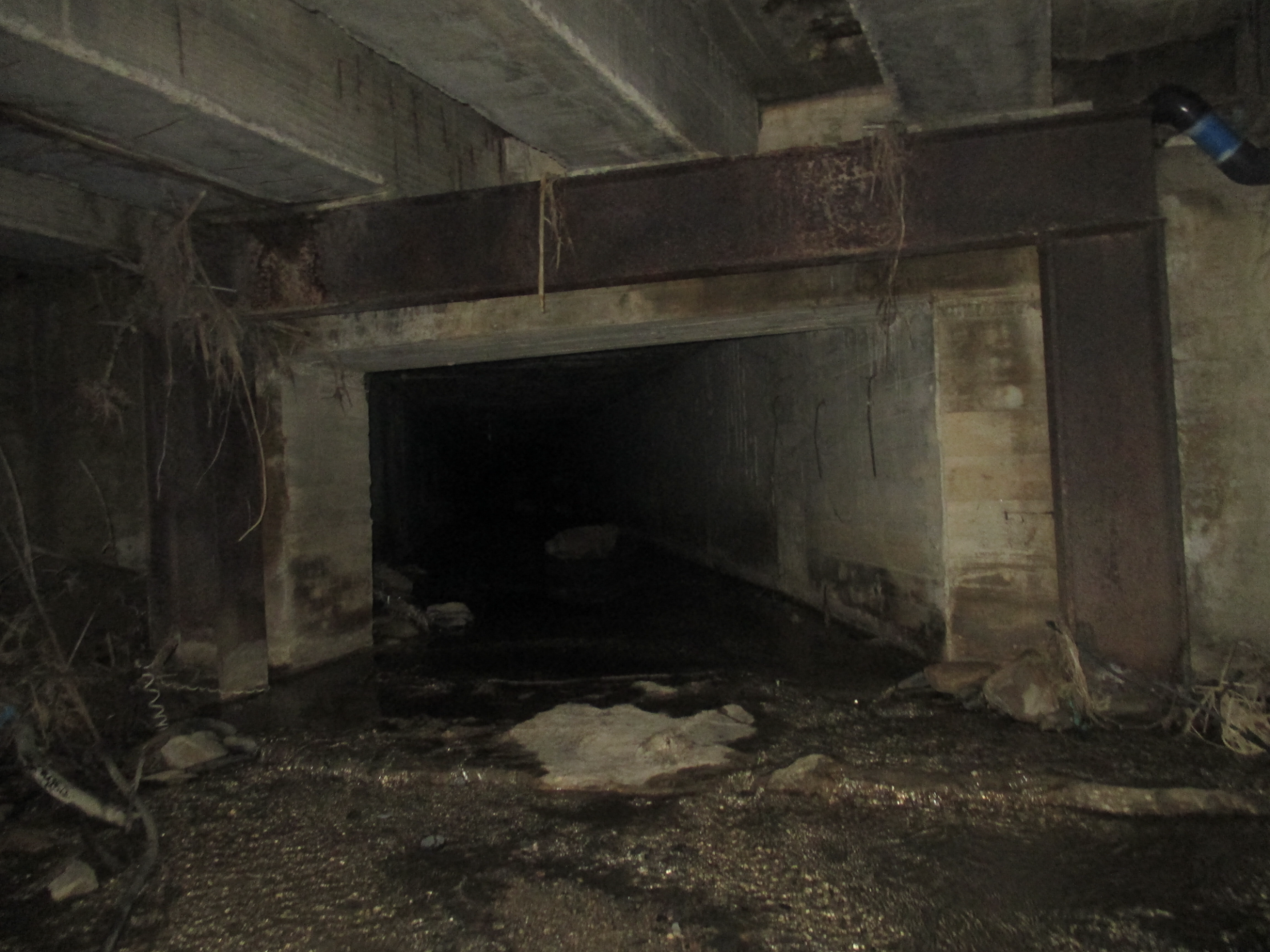
Version 3 Present Day Arroyo De Juan Benítez culvert

It is surrounded by a steel beam and two columns, with the measurements of the beams and columns, a total weight of 1,042 kg (2,297 lb) is added and resulted. A calculated weight of 492 kg (1,085 lb) for the top horizontal steel beam with a length of 9 feet 10 inches (3.00 metres) and a weight of 275 kg (606 lb) each for the two steel columns either side with a height of 5 ft (1.5 m).

It was 22 November 1989 when the 3rd and present version of the Juan Benítez culvert was announced to commence construction. Whilst heavy storms and flooding occurred during an news interview with the mayor of Estepona, it was said that the Arroyo De Juan Benítez Embovedamiento project was very important and the new embovedado would be completed if they managed to get enough concentrated personnel.

Version 2 of the Juan Benítez culvert outfall is located 160 metres north from the current version Juan Benítez outfall. It is same shape, except with slightly smaller height, and stays the same height its entire length. It had a 90° bend inside that caused hydraulic problems which was the reason the third version of the culvert was built.

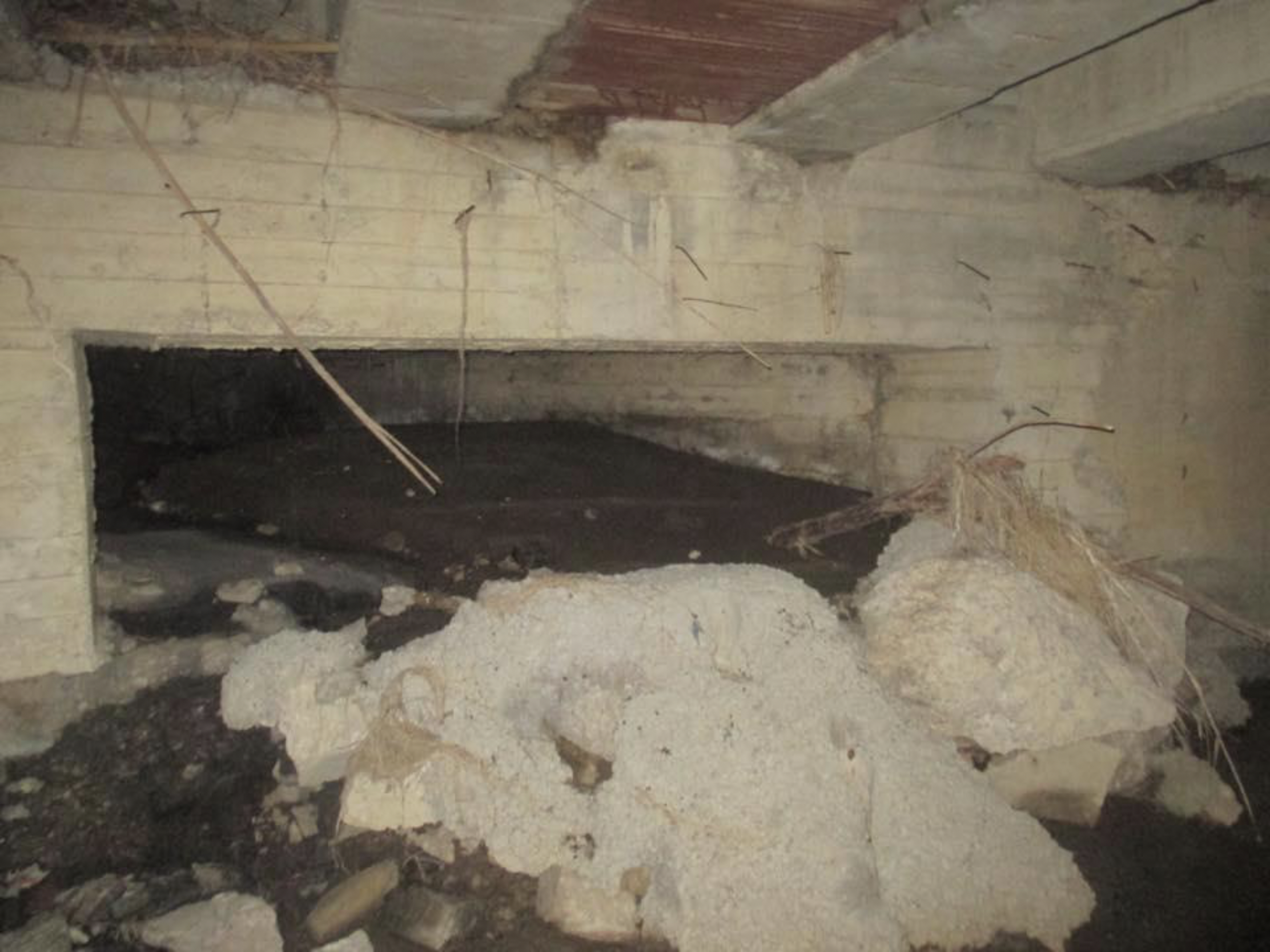
2nd version of the Arroyo De Juan Benítez culvert in 2019

Version 2 previously was built to relieve version 1 of its duties as it also had a 90° (right angle) bend. Due to the circumstances, the version-2 culvert was built with the same exact same right angle as before, which was later resolved in the version-3 modern day culvert.

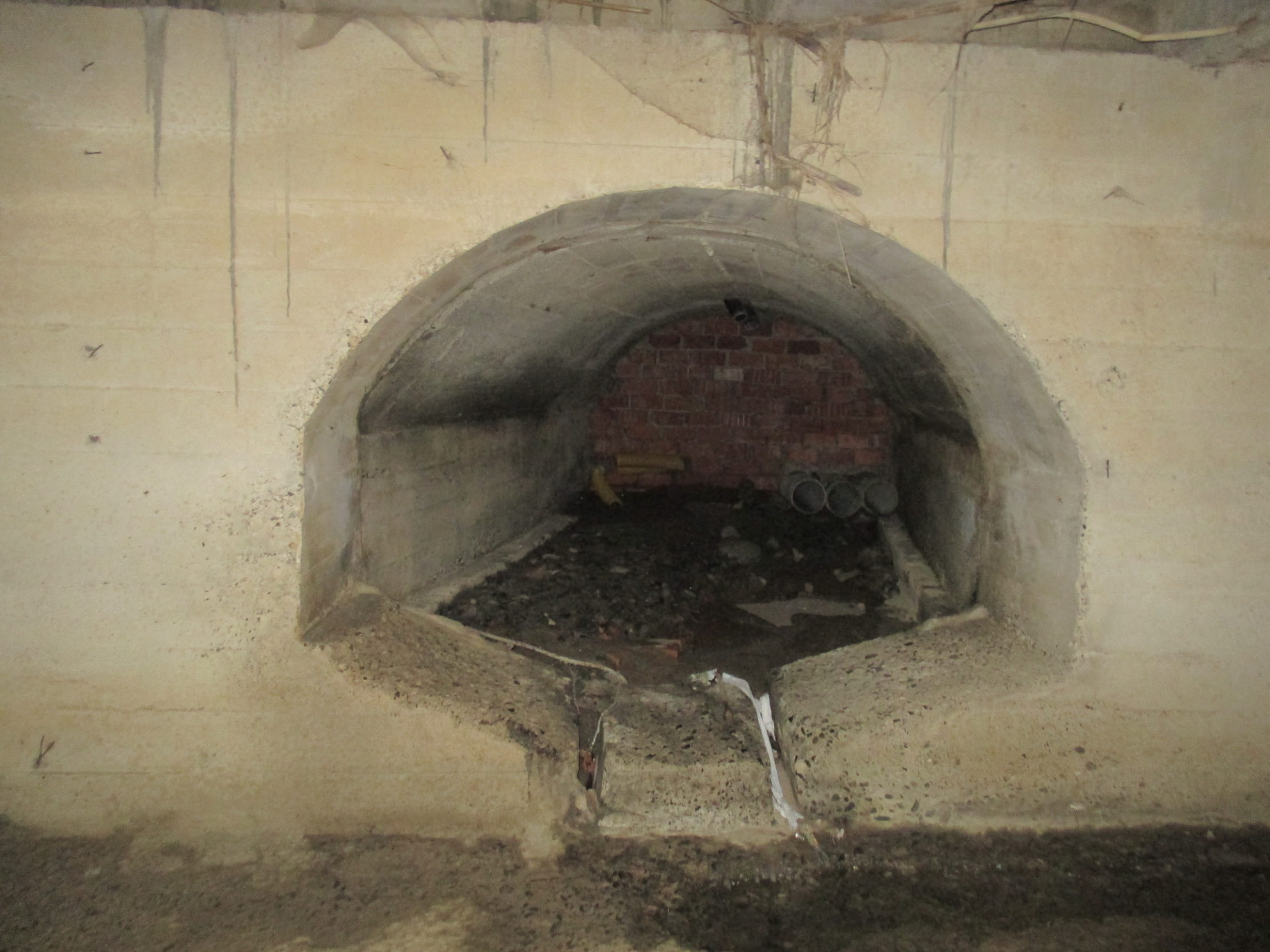
Version 1 Arroyo de juan benítez

The 1st version of the culvert is located quite a distance from the previous outfalls and is located only 140 metres from the northern inlet of the Rio Monterroso culvert. Its outfall is located directly under Av. J. Martín. Mendéz and it has a different design than the other two, consisting of a vaulted ceiling and a channel on the floor designed to channel the water through the centre so that water does not accumulate. It was built with a 90° (right angle) bend that was located under San Fernando football stadium.

Versions 1 and 2 are now both bricked up and unused. Version 2 has accumulated silt and concrete debris from lack of use.

== Original culvert ==
The original N340 route of the Estepona crossing followed the old horseshoe path, which ran between the coast and the seafront of the town after passing a small fishermen's neighborhood and the Monterroso River. Its proximity to the sea soon caused frequent problems due to storms, and in 1895 authorities came to consider the possibility of rectifying the route by leading it, through the interior, through streets Calle Real and Calle Caridad. The proposal was in such, and the crossing did not suffer alterations of entity in the years that followed its construction.

Already in the 1920s, the incorporation of the road from Malaga to Cádiz in the National Circuit of Special Roads (1926/1939) resulted in the improvement of the old macadam roadway through asphalt irrigation and, years later, the works of the Modernization Plan (1950/1960) also made it possible to improve the road and geometry of the crossing.

The growth of the town was, in any case, extremely slow, and in the mid-sixties the crossing continued to be limited to the historic center and the fishermen's neighborhood. It was not, in fact, until the last years of that decade when the construction of a first round was proposed and, with the inclusion of the route from Malaga to La Línea and Cádiz in the program of the Network of Asphalt Itineraries (REDIA, 1967/1971), the transformation of the crossing into a continuous axis of four lanes of 3.50 meters.

Although growth in the road environment remained weak, transit traffic observed strong increases throughout the decades of the seventies and eighties, turning the crossing into a highly conflictive artery that, in addition, generated a strong barrier effect between the town and the beach. The Estepona variant, which had been programmed in the General Road Plan 1984/91, was not inaugurated until 1993.

At present, after its reorganization, the old crossing of Estepona articulates, in its entirety, the promenade of the urban center. It corresponds to Avenida de España, and consists of two three-lane sections with an intermediate roundabout at the confluence with Avenida Juan Carlos I. The first of the sections, which corresponds to the fishermen's neighborhood, has two lanes in the direction of Cádiz and one in the direction of Malaga, and has its origin in the roundabout connecting with Avenida del Carmen. The second, which corresponds to the historic center, has two lanes in the direction of Malaga and one in the direction of Cádiz, and ends at the roundabout connecting with Avenida del Litoral and Avenida de Andalucía.

In April 1965, the Monterroso River was originally culverted on the coastline and extended was approximately 45 metres (148 ft) long for use as the n340 passover. The n340 is a road over 1000 km long, was the only road connecting two halves of southern Andalusia, and had large amounts of traffic. The culvert was originally budgeted at 294,053.93 Pesetas however the finish price costed 9,828,431.02 Pesetas.

Like the original Monterroso river culvert, most Spanish culverts from that era featured a vaulted ceiling, which is where the name "Embovedado" comes from when associated with culverts in Spain.

In 1970 the original 60s culvert was extended with a rectangular beam bridge with a span of about 10 metres, 3 years later the modern Av de Juan Carlos 1 culvert was constructed using the same dimensions as the bridge. The arches of the original culvert were embedded into the bridge.

On October 10, 1986, due to the funneling effect of the rectangular culvert, the 1965 culvert shifted breaking apart the surrounding bridges, causing a 700 square metre sinkhole.

== Drainage ==
Stormwater

Inside the Monterroso river culvert, there are storm drains and sewers connected to the outfall into the culvert system via pipes. The pipes range from 5 inches to 4 feet in diameter, and there are hundreds pipes that discharge into the Monterroso network.

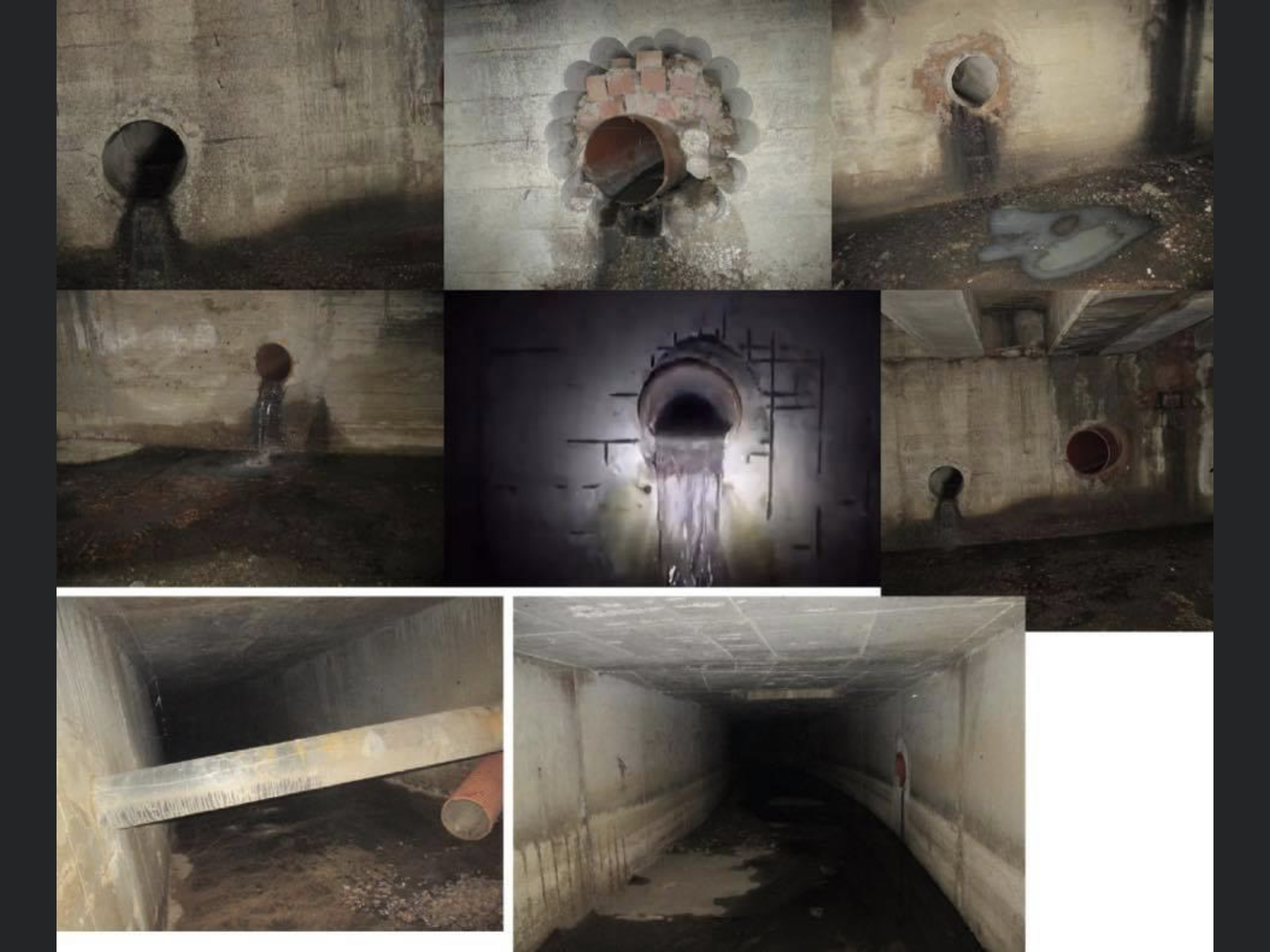
Examples of the drains in the Monterroso and Juan Benítez culvert.

The majority of drainage lines that both systems, Monterroso and Juan Benítez intercept are runoff from the city of Estepona above, a portion of these are lateral lines that directly connect to catch basins, others involved are storm drainage networks that discharge into the underground system.

Combined systems

Estepona, much like other coastal spanish cities rely heavily upon Combined Sewer Systems. A small portion of Lateral lines throughout Central Estepona are the sewer overflow lines, located within underground manhole chambers are occasional weirs that form a Combined Sewer Regulator

== Gallery ==
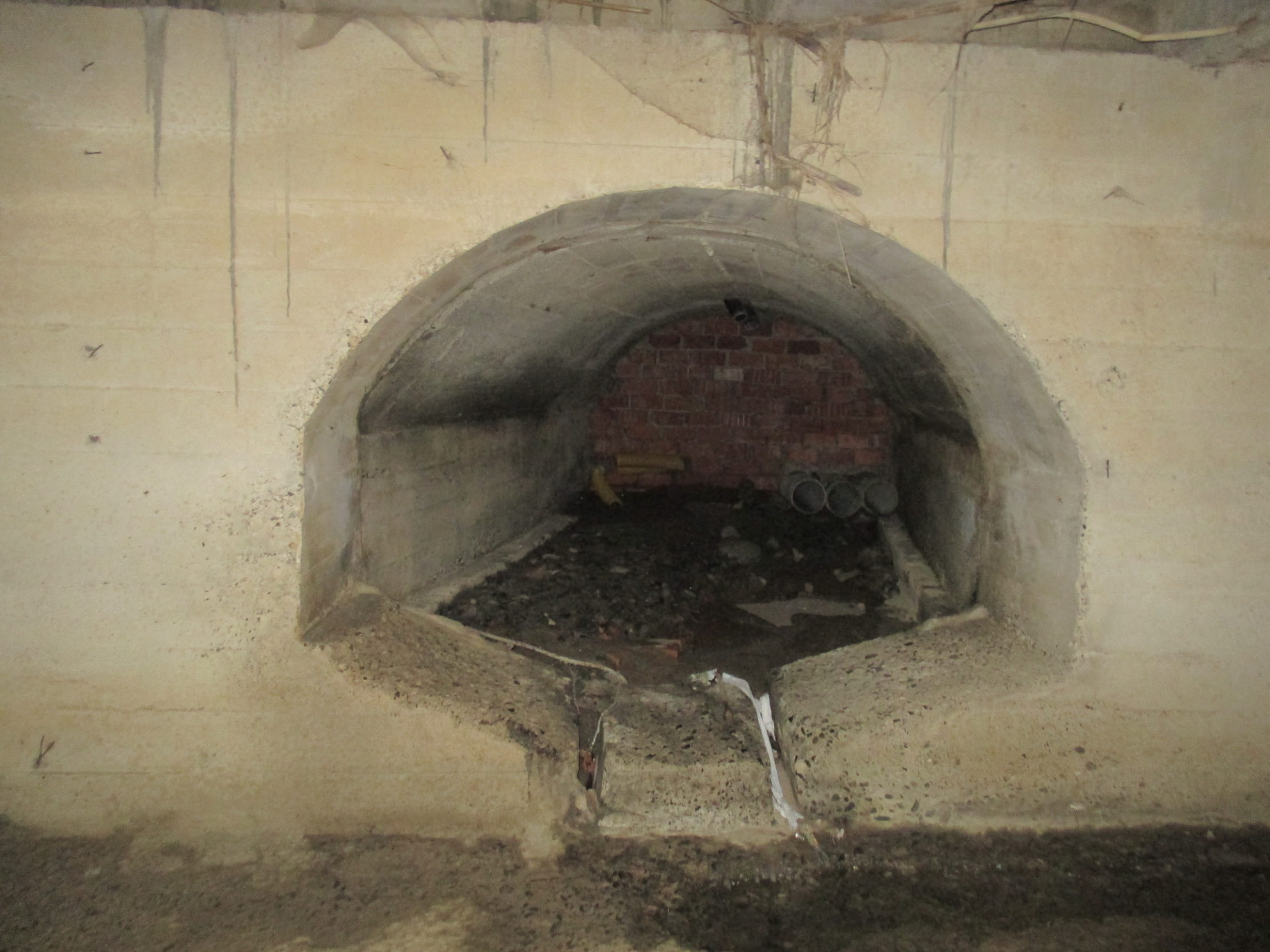
First version of the arroyo de Juan Benítez culvert in 2020.

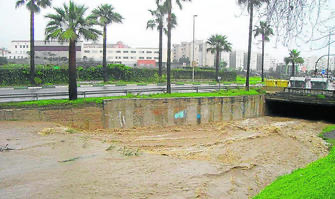
River Monterroso Culvert inlet

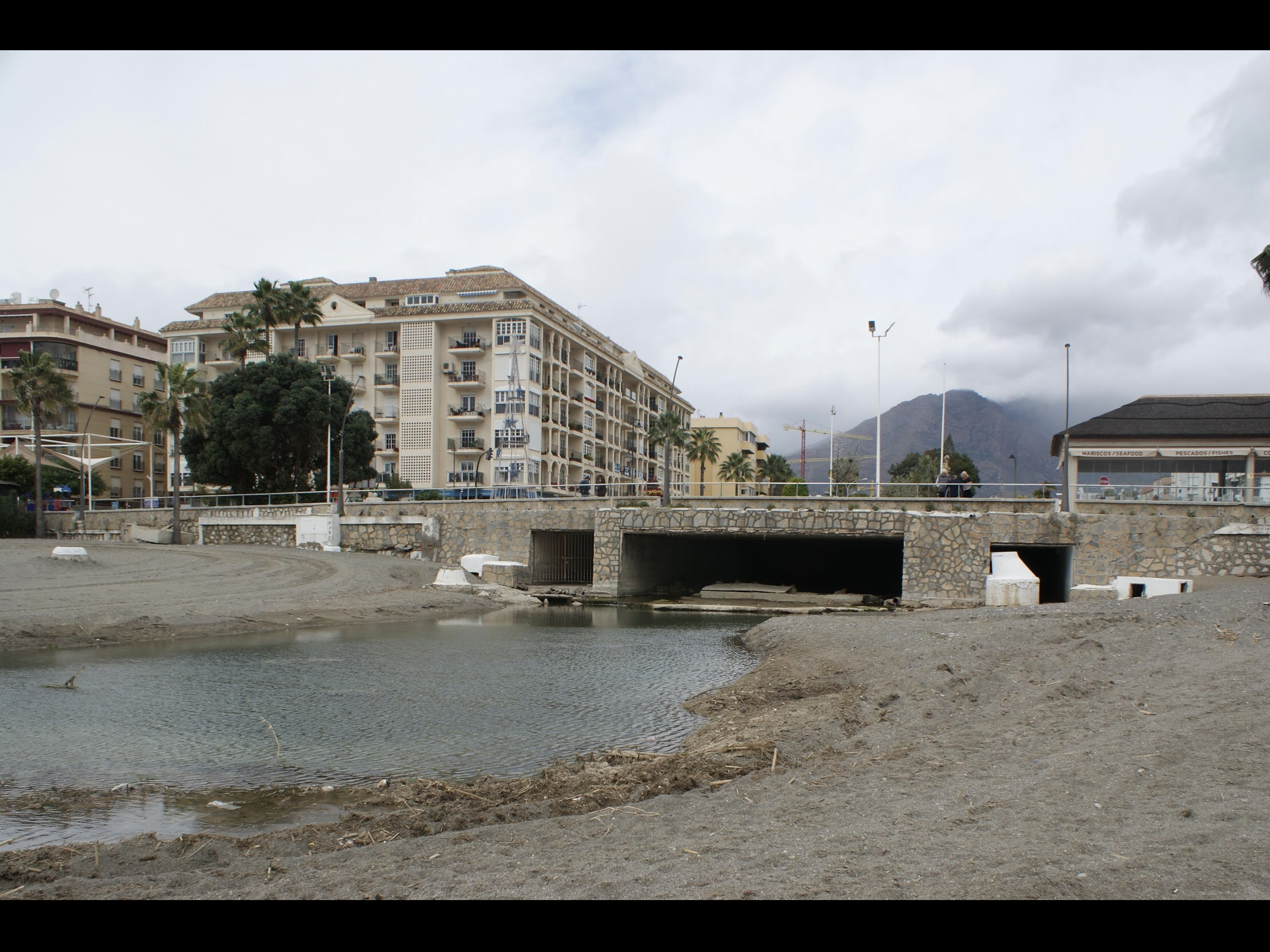
The River Monterroso Culvert on the beach

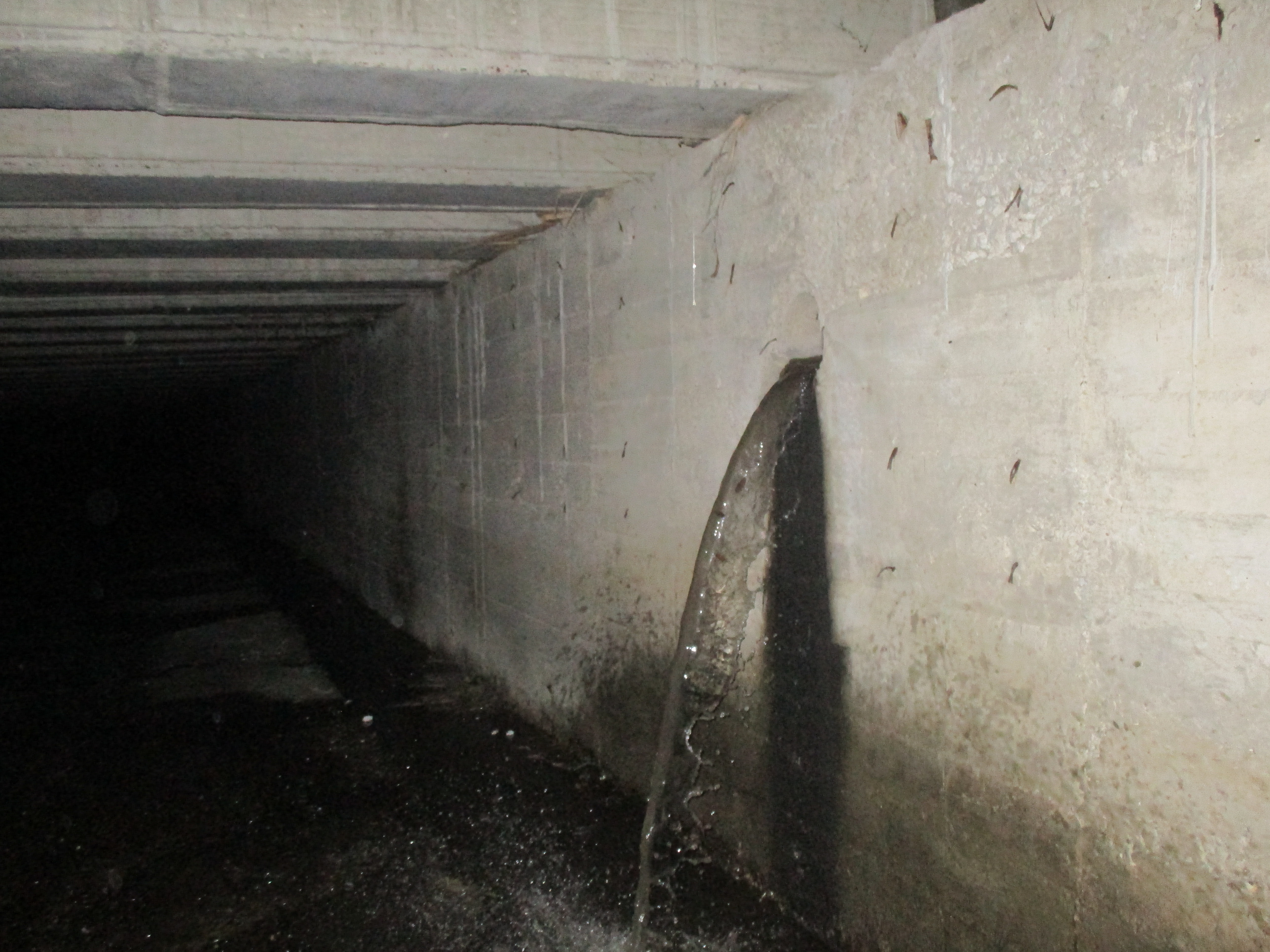
7 inch pipe outputting greywater and stormwater during rain

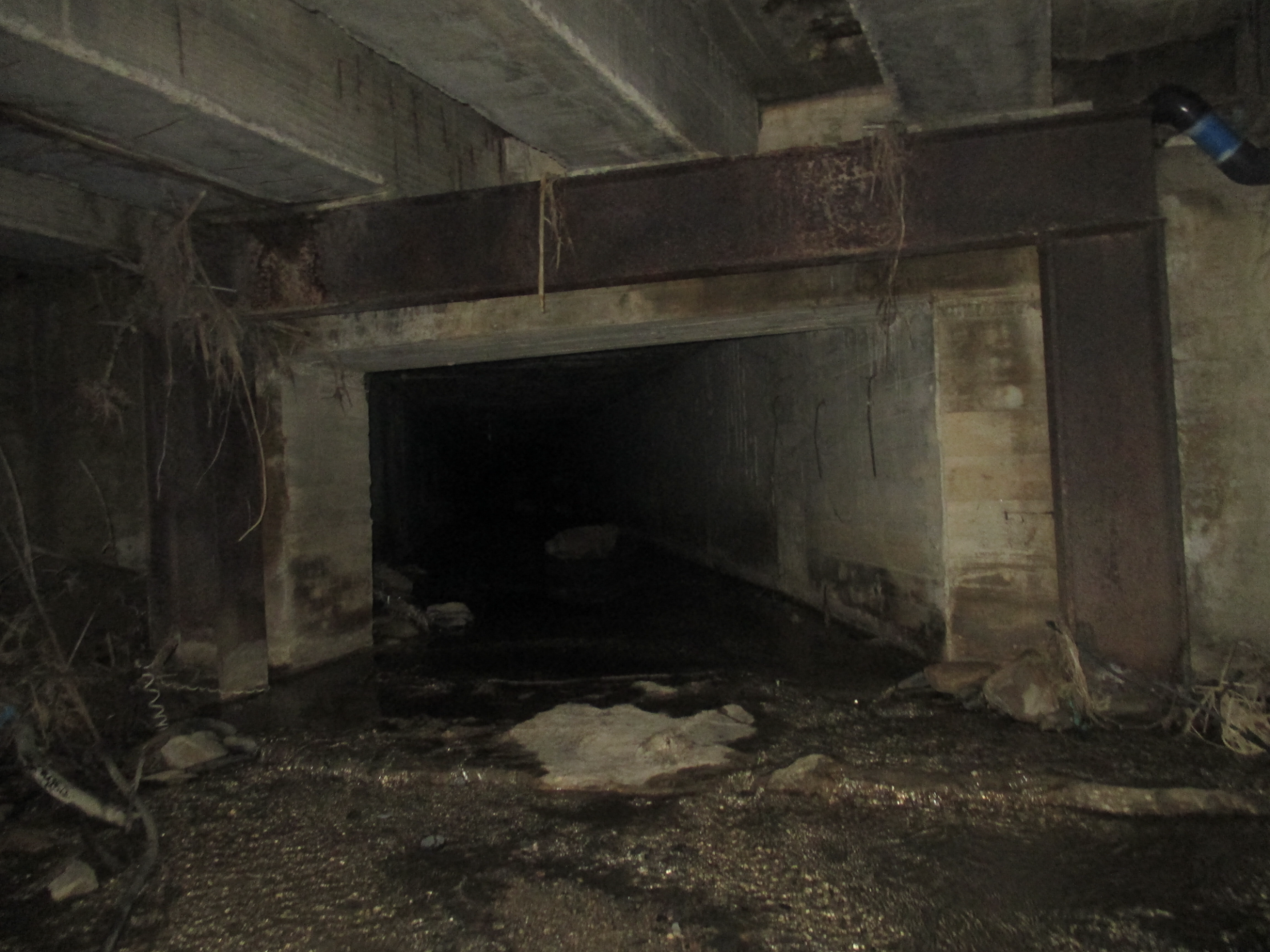
The Arroyo De Juan Benítez outfall in the river Monterroso culvert

== See also ==
- Mediterranean Sea
