= Monterrosa =

Monterrosa is a surname. Notable people with the surname include:

- Abraham Monterrosa (born 1975), Salvadoran footballer
- Domingo Monterrosa (born 1940), Salvadoran military commander
- Marvin Monterrosa (born 1991), Salvadoran footballer
- Sean Monterrosa (1998–2020), American shooting victim of the Vallejo police department
