= Suter's Tavern =

- The Fountain Inn
- Interactive map of the Suter's Tavern area

General information
- Type: Tavern, inn
- Location: Georgetown, Washington, D.C. (originally Maryland), Fishing Lane (near modern 31st and K Streets, NW)
- Coordinates: 38°54′11″N 77°03′43″W
- Owner: John Suter

Technical details
- Material: Timber frame

Suter's Tavern, officially known as The Fountain Inn, was a tavern located in Georgetown, Maryland, which later became part of Washington, D.C. Established by clockmaker John Suter in 1783, it was Georgetown's best-known establishment until it was eclipsed by newer taverns in the early 1790s.

John Suter established the tavern in Georgetown on Fishing Lane, near today's intersection of 31st and K Streets, NW. Though the precise location of the tavern is not entirely clear, it is known to have been located about two blocks southwest of the Old Stone House, where Suter's son, John Jr., resided. A photograph often identified as Suter's Tavern has been questioned by some historians, who argue the original building was likely demolished by the 1830s, predating the photograph. The building that housed the tavern has been described as a small building, one and a half stories, with a large inn yard in back to accommodate coaches and wagons.

Suter's Tavern was the location of meetings between George Washington, Andrew Ellicott, and Major Pierre L’Enfant to plan what would one day become the nation's capital Suter continued to operate this tavern until his death in 1794, after which his wife continued running it until early 1796. Clement Sewall took over in February 1796, but his tenure was short-lived. Before the year was out, he departed in December to run the newly constructed City Tavern, which later became the City Tavern Club before closing its doors in 2024. Once the elite clientele moved on, the building became a casual oyster house serving cheap shellfish and quick drinks to locals, eventually disappearing without record.

The Fountain Inn hosted pivotal moments in early American history, frequented by figures like George Washington and serving as the site for crucial land negotiations that established the new Federal City. As the young republic evolved, the tavern became a political hub, almost certainly home to intense debates, party caucuses, and arguments among local politicians, electors, and patrons as the nation chose its third president in 1796.

Whiskey collectors and local industry veterans resurrected the name, opening in 2022 the Fountain Inn at 1659 Wisconsin Avenue NW in Georgetown.
