= City Tavern Club =

Private club in Washington, D.C., U.S.

- Type: Social club
- Tax ID no.: 53-0258392
- Website: www.citytavernclubdc.org
- City Tavern
- U.S. National Register of Historic Places
- D.C. Inventory of Historic Sites
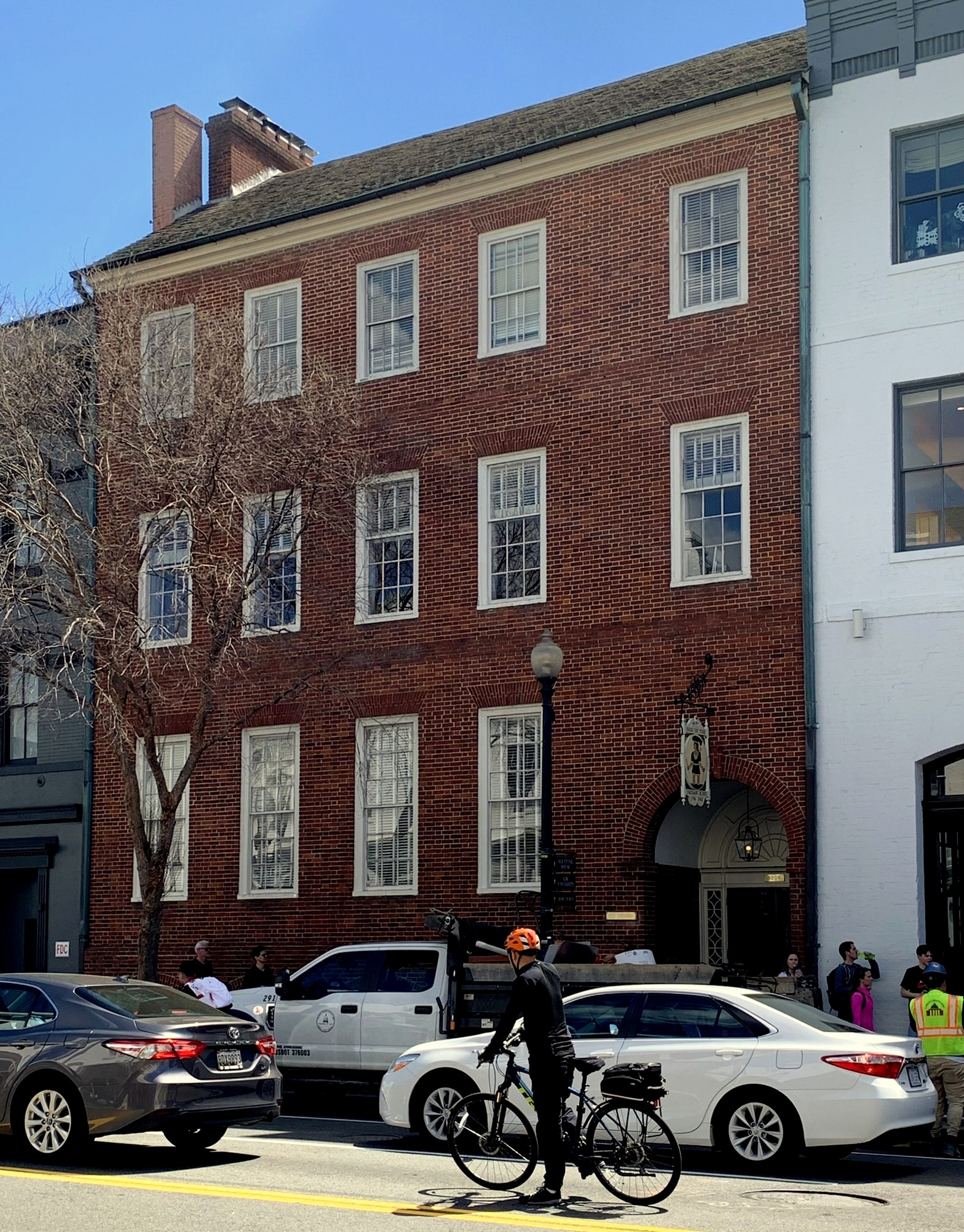
- City Tavern Club in 2022

- Location within Washington, D.C.
- Location: 3206 M Street, N.W. Washington, D.C.
- Coordinates: 38°54′18.1″N 77°3′47.5″W
- Built: 1796
- Architectural style: Federal
- NRHP reference No.: 91001489

Significant dates
- Added to NRHP: January 17, 1992
- Designated DCIHS: November 8, 1964

The City Tavern Club was a private club in the Georgetown area of Washington, D.C., United States. It was housed in the City Tavern, one of the oldest buildings and the last remaining Federal-period tavern in the city. It closed on August 31, 2024.

== City Tavern Association ==
In 1959, a group of Georgetowners formed the City Tavern Association, in part to preserve the historic City Tavern, one of the oldest buildings in Washington, D.C. The old tavern, located just north of the C&O Canal and near M Street and Wisconsin Avenue in Georgetown, was beautifully restored and reopened as a private club in 1962. The clubhouse and its furnishings are fine examples of the American Federal style. The Washington Post called the City Tavern Club "one of the best examples of historic restoration in the city."

== City Tavern ==
The City Tavern was constructed in 1796 and first managed by Clement Sewall, who served in the Revolutionary War alongside his friend John Parke Custis, George Washington’s stepson. Sewall enlisted as a sergeant at age 19 in the Maryland Line, was promoted six months later to ensign and then severely wounded at the Battle of Germantown. In the years following the war, Sewall relocated his family to Georgetown and managed another significant inn known as the Fountain Inn (also known as Suter's Tavern) on Fishing Lane (near the corner of today’s 31st and K Streets), where President Washington negotiated with local land owners to create the new Federal City. At the time, Georgetown was a separate municipality and thriving port in the nascent District of Columbia and the new City Tavern was one of several inns built to meet the growing demand for lodging. Located in the heart of Georgetown, the City Tavern served not only as a traditional lodging house but also as the meeting place for Georgetown’s governing body, the Georgetown Corporation and the location for elections and meetings of the Mayor’s Court. It also served as the terminal stop of the Georgetown-Frederick stagecoach line. Of the several taverns that were constructed in Georgetown during the founding era, the City Tavern is the only one that remains today.

Many of the country’s founding fathers, including George Washington, Thomas Jefferson and John Adams frequented the City Tavern during this historic time. President Washington was on the Board of the Bank of Columbia next door, and President Adams stayed at the City Tavern when he came from Philadelphia to inspect the buildings under construction for the new national capital. On June 6, 1800, Adams was honored at a banquet in the Long Room of the Tavern where “the utmost harmony and conviviality prevailed,” and he gave the toast, “Georgetown - May its prosperity equal the ardent enterprise of its inhabitants, and the felicity of their situation.” On January 17, 1981, at an occasion to celebrate his upcoming inauguration, President Ronald Reagan alluded to that famous party in a toast he made at the Club. As he raised his glass, President Reagan quipped there was no truth to the rumor that he was present at the banquet honoring President Adams. Today, a portrait of Adams’ wife, Abigail Adams, hangs above the functioning fireplace in the Long Room as a reminder of that momentous occasion over 200 years ago.

Management of the City Tavern changed hands many times, and it was known variously as Semmes’ Tavern, The Indian King Tavern, the Columbian Inn, United States Hotel, Georgetown Hotel, and Morgan House, until 1898, when the building was converted to retail use. By 1960, the City Tavern had fallen into a dismal state of disrepair and housed a print shop on its street level. The building faced imminent demise and was scheduled to be razed and paved for a parking lot. A group of Georgetowners happened on the Tavern and, anxious to preserve the historic landmark they found hiding behind the façade of the ordinary print shop, formed the City Tavern Association. Through the association's determination and tireless work, the grand old tavern was restored to its original grandeur, while preserving its architectural authenticity, and it reopened as a private club in 1962. The clubhouse and its furnishings are fine examples of the American Federal period, which The Washington Post called, “one of the best examples of historic restoration in the city.”

The District of Columbia added the City Tavern to the District of Columbia Inventory of Historic Sites on November 8, 1964, and the United States Department of the Interior's National Park Service listed the City Tavern on the National Register of Historic Places on January 17, 1992.

== The Club ==
The City Tavern Club (CTC) was home to the Indian King Society (IKS); for part of its history, the City Tavern was renamed the Indian King Tavern, and to this day its outdoor sign is "The Sign of the Indian King." Members and guests came to CTC for intimate dinners in the library, private luncheons in the Long Room, and elegant galas in the Great Hall. CTC also hosted many special events for both members and guests.

== Cecchi Group ownership ==
In November 2024 developer John Cecchi purchased the club for $8.5 million. The new ownership rents out the property for private events.

== See also ==
- List of American gentlemen's clubs
