= Georgetown (Washington, D.C.) =

Neighborhood of Washington, United States

- Neighborhood of Washington, D.C.
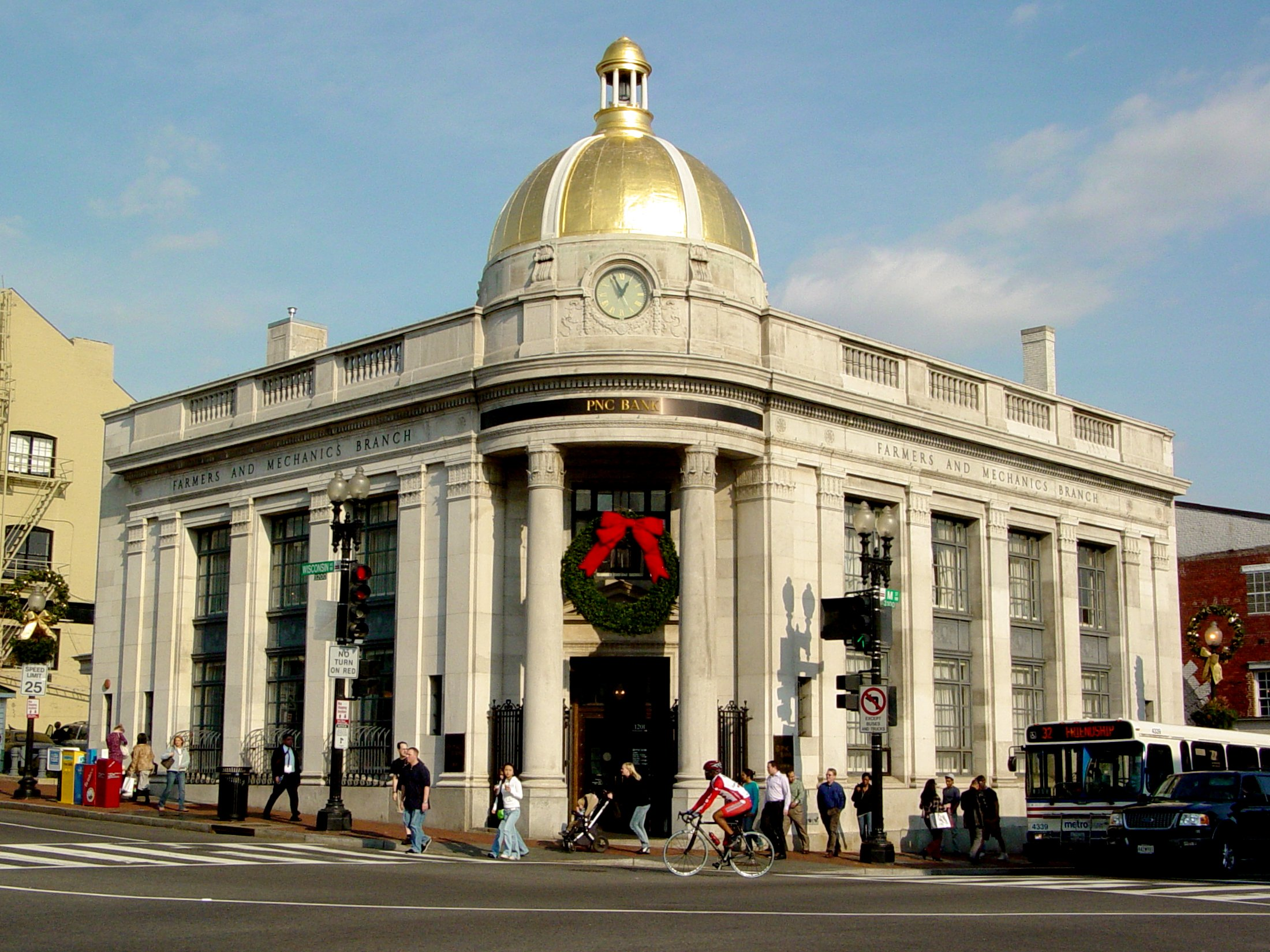
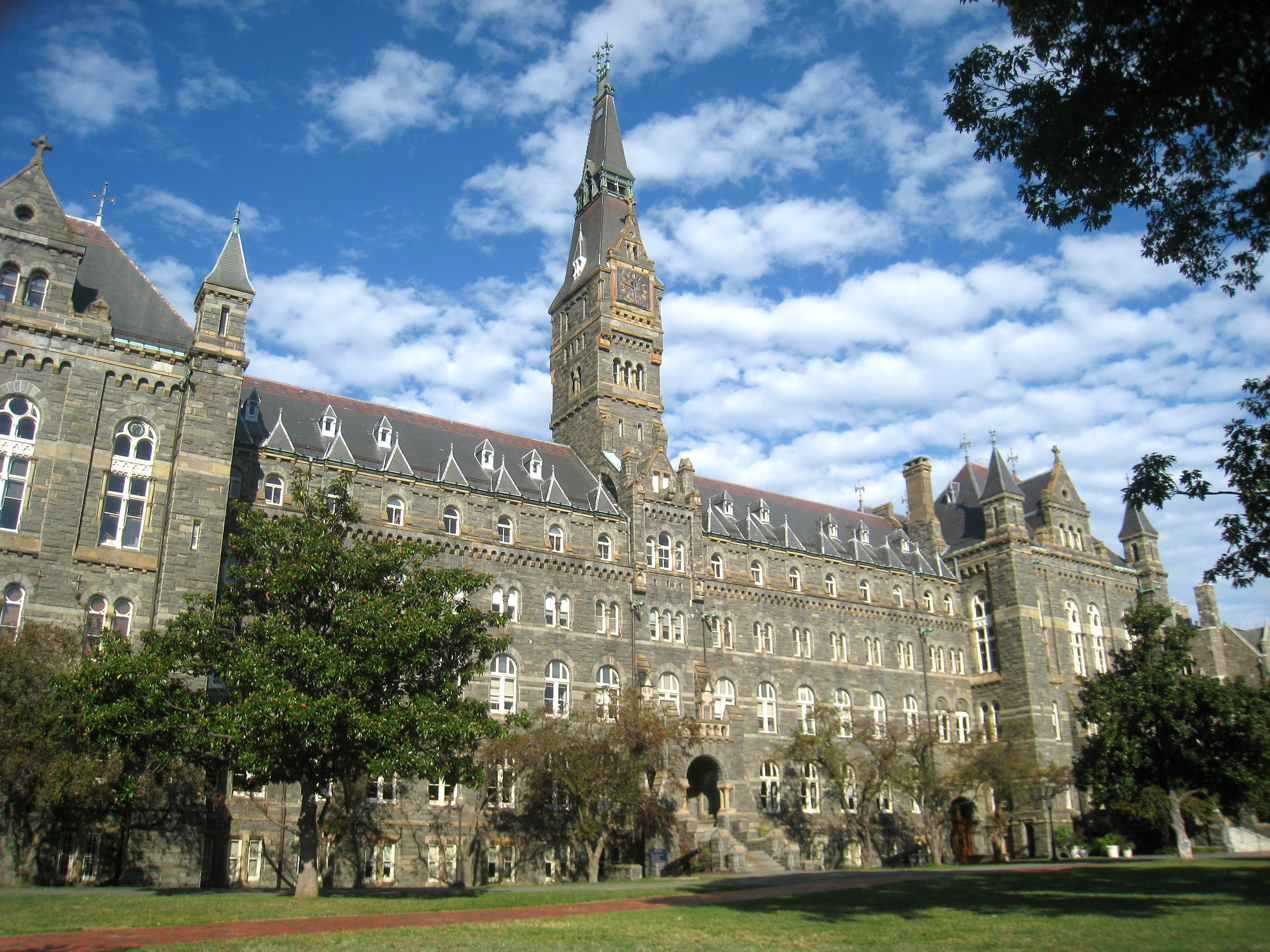
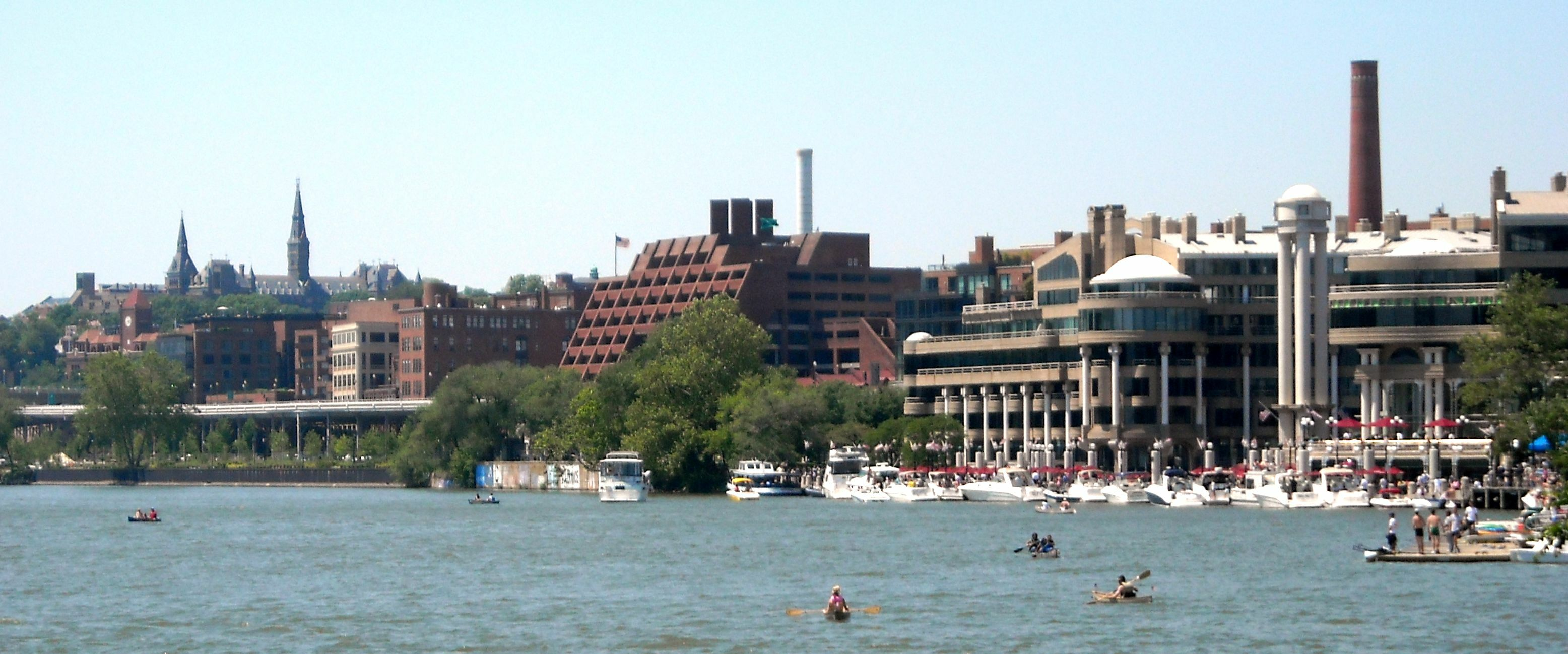
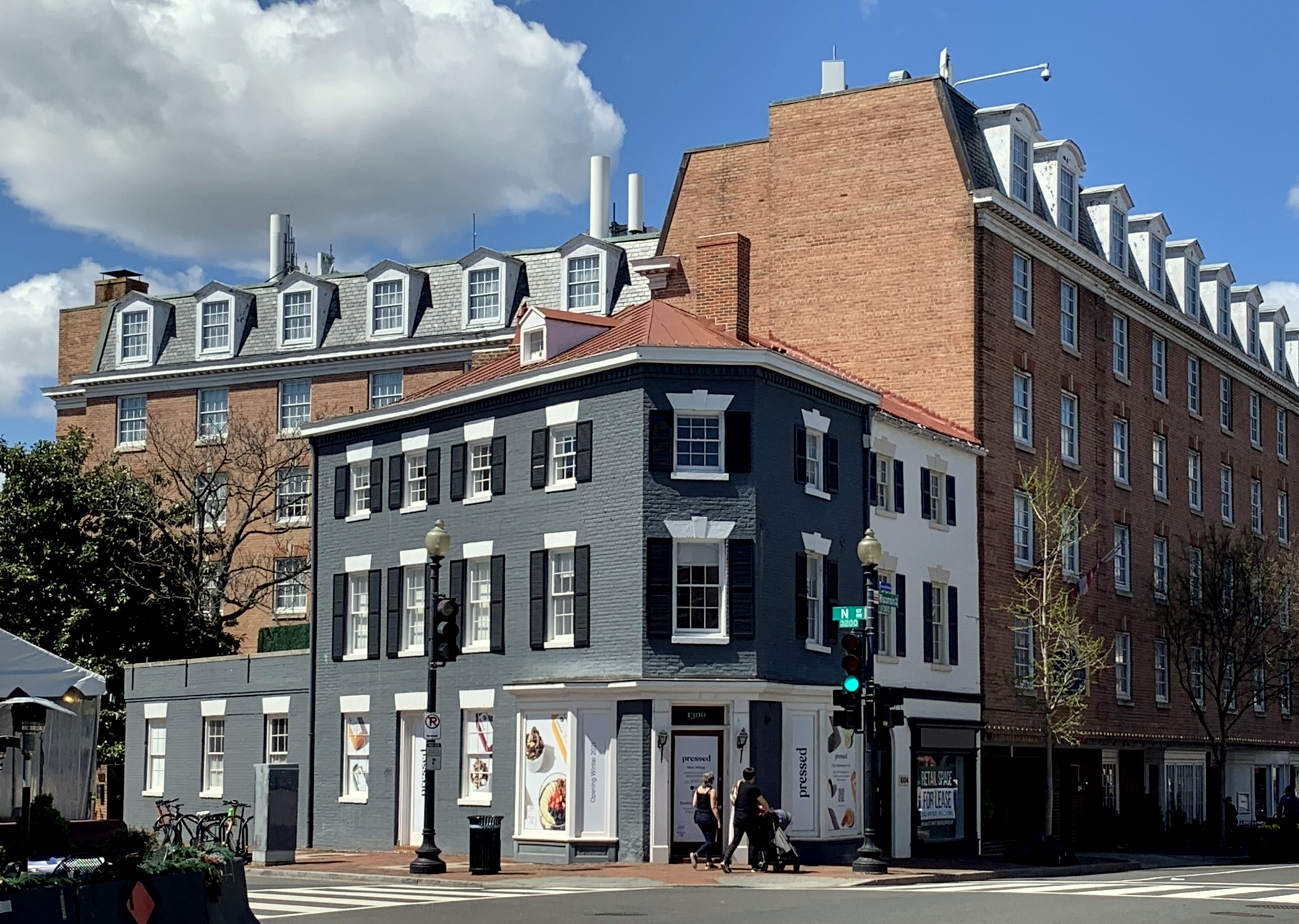
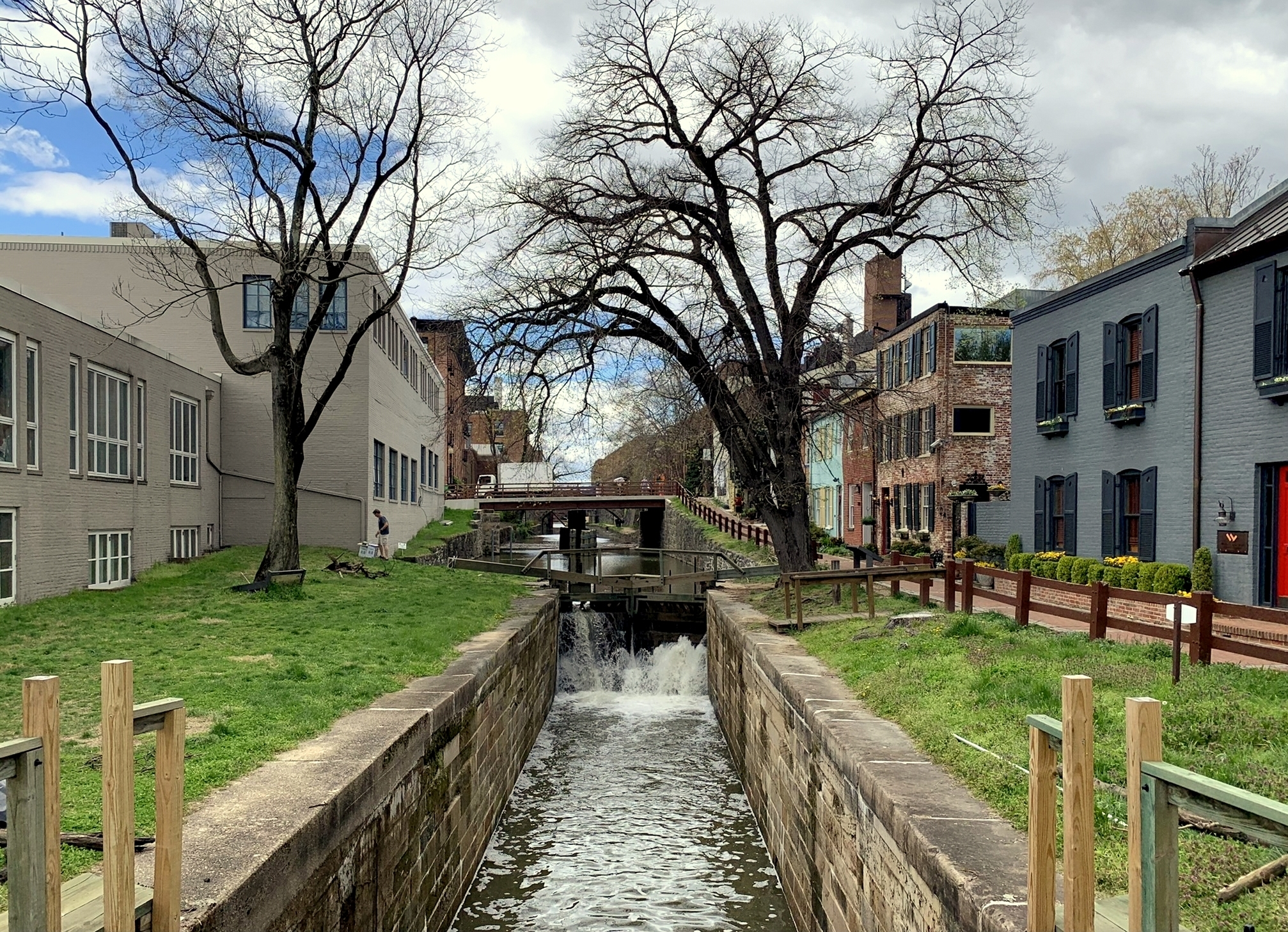
- Riggs Bank Georgetown University Washington Harbour Wisconsin Avenue C&O Canal

- Coordinates: 38.909644°N 77.029647°W
- Country: United States
- District: Washington, D.C.
- Quadrant: Northwest
- Ward: 2

Georgetown is a historic neighborhood and commercial district in Northwest Washington, D.C., situated along the Potomac River. Founded in 1751 as part of the colonial-era Province of Maryland, Georgetown predated the establishment of Washington, D.C. by 40 years. Georgetown was an independent municipality until 1871 when the United States Congress created a new consolidated government for the entire District of Columbia. A separate act, passed in 1895, repealed Georgetown's remaining local ordinances and renamed Georgetown's streets to conform with those in Washington, D.C.

The primary commercial corridors of Georgetown are the intersection of Wisconsin Avenue and M Street, which contain high-end shops, bars, restaurants, and Georgetown Park, an enclosed shopping mall. Washington Harbour, which includes waterfront restaurants, is located to the south on K Street between 30th and 31st Streets.

Georgetown is home to the main campus of Georgetown University and other landmarks, including the Old Stone House (1765), the oldest still standing building structure in Washington, D.C., the Volta Bureau for deaf education, the Dumbarton Oaks estate, and a historically significant stretch of the Chesapeake and Ohio Canal. The embassies of Cameroon, France, Iceland, Liechtenstein, Mongolia, Sweden, Thailand, Ukraine, and Venezuela are located in Georgetown.

== History ==
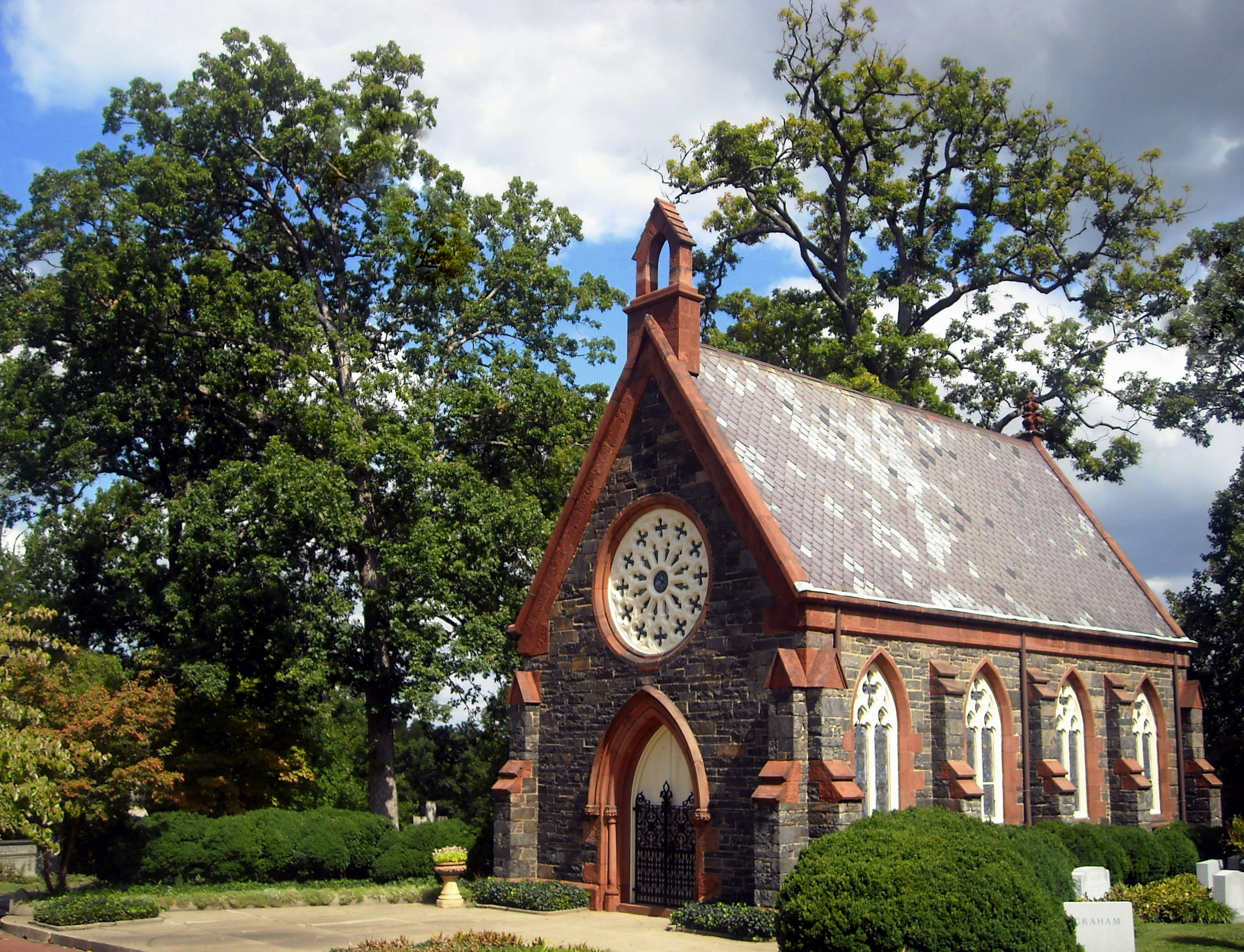
Oak Hill Cemetery Chapel, designed by James Renwick Jr. in 1850, is listed on the National Register of Historic Places.

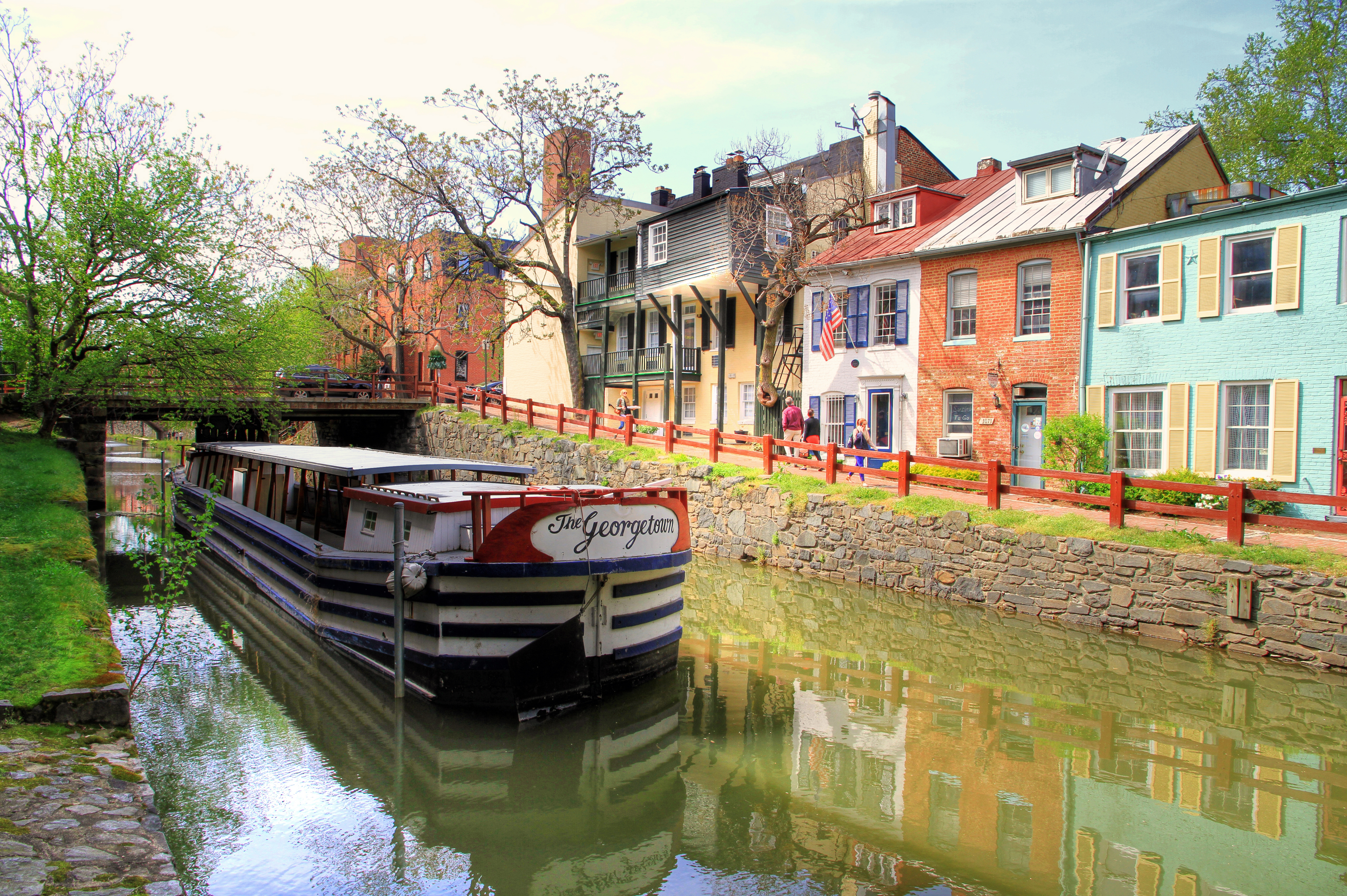
Chesapeake and Ohio Canal

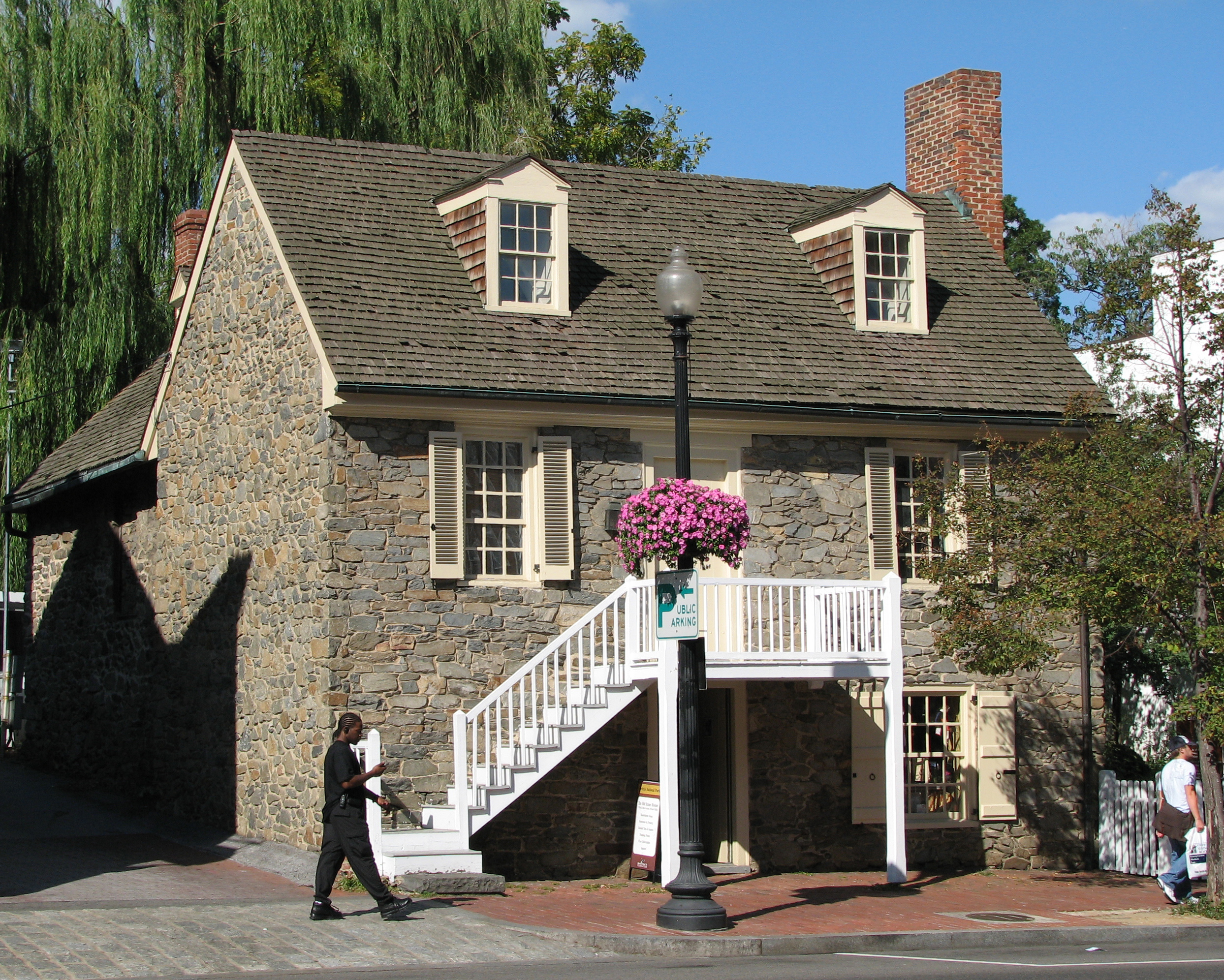
Old Stone House, built 1765, is the oldest building structure still standing in Washington, D.C.

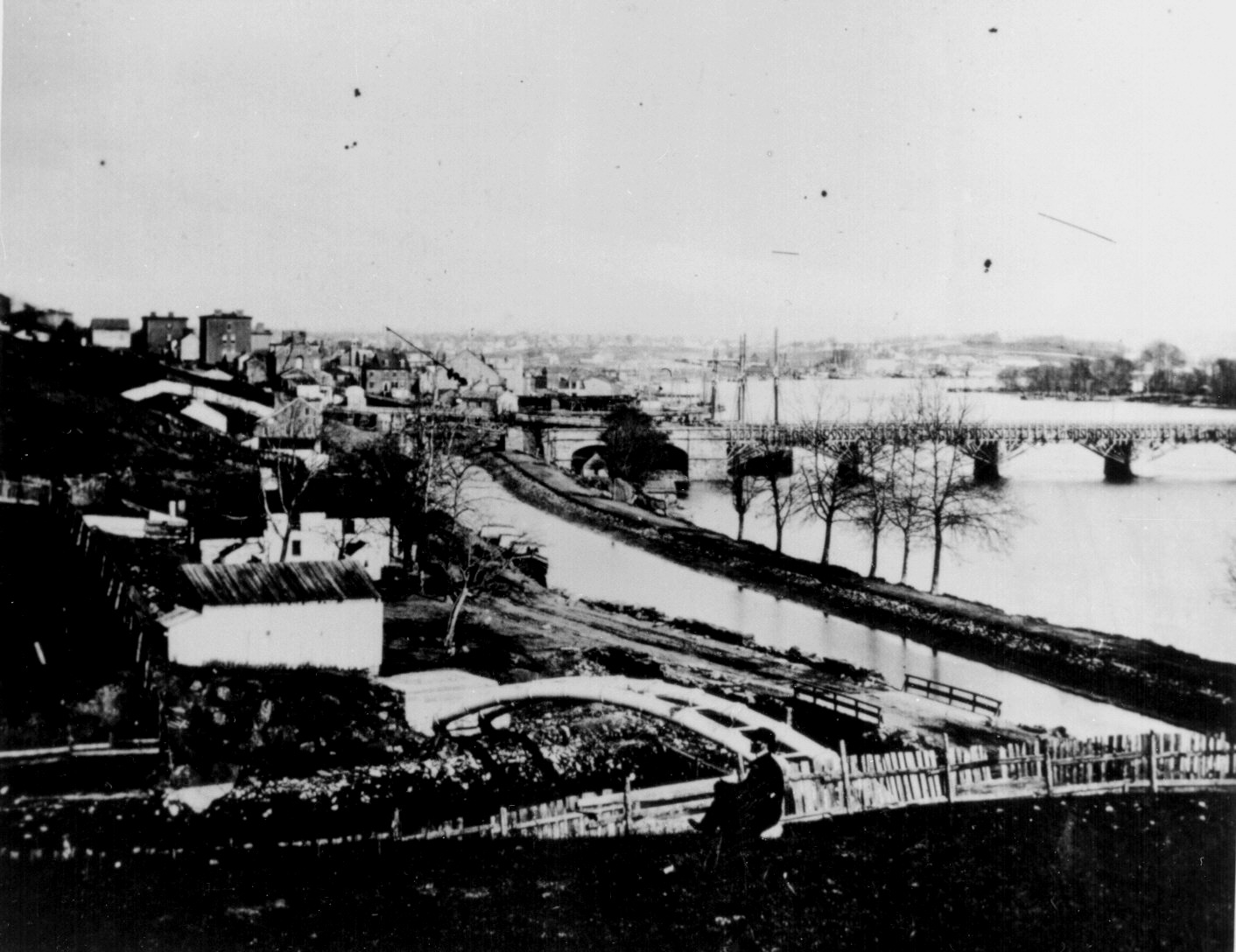
Georgetown, depicted in 1862, shows the Chesapeake and Ohio Canal and Aqueduct Bridge (on right) and an unfinished Capitol dome in the distant background.

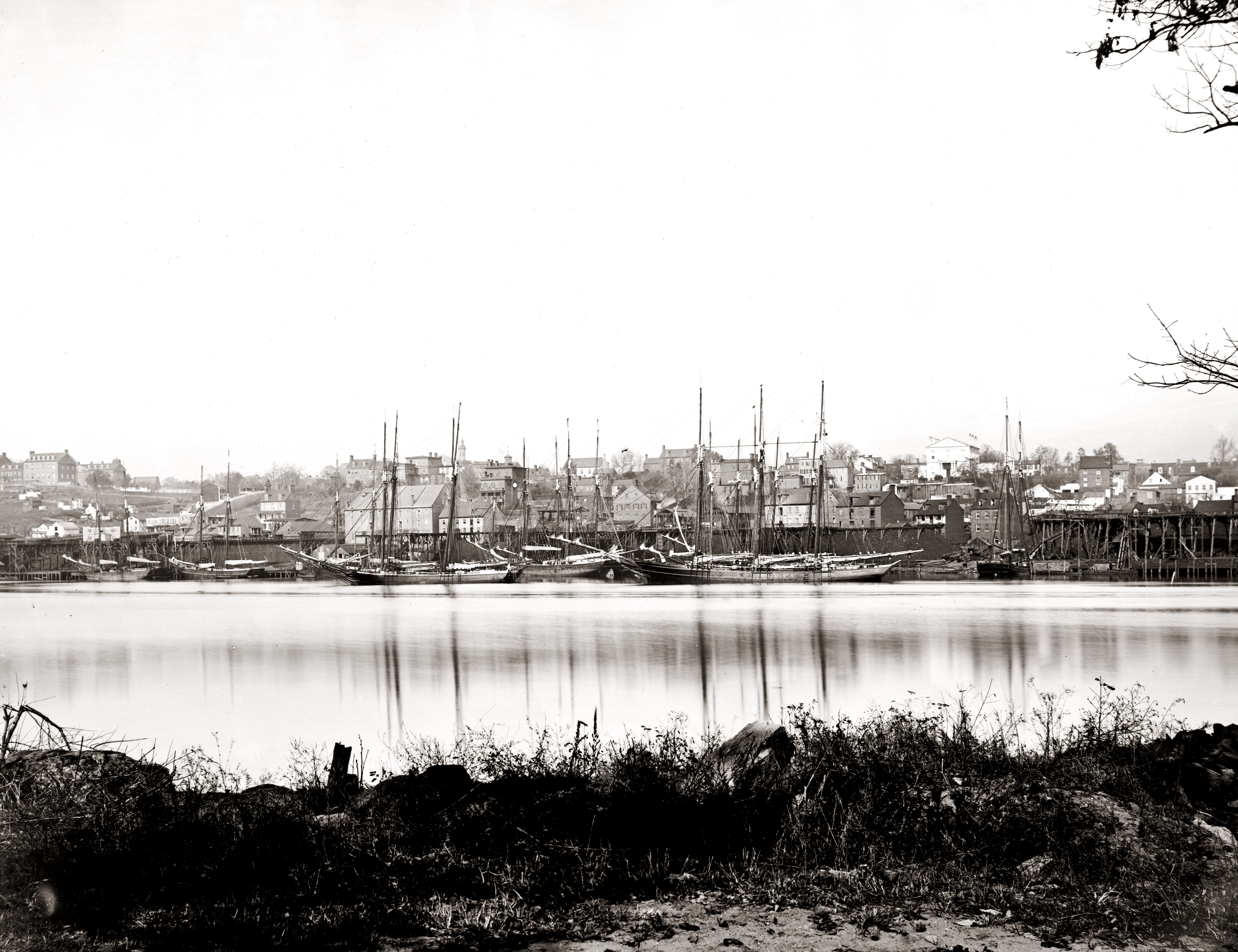
Sailing vessels docked at the Georgetown waterfront, c. 1865

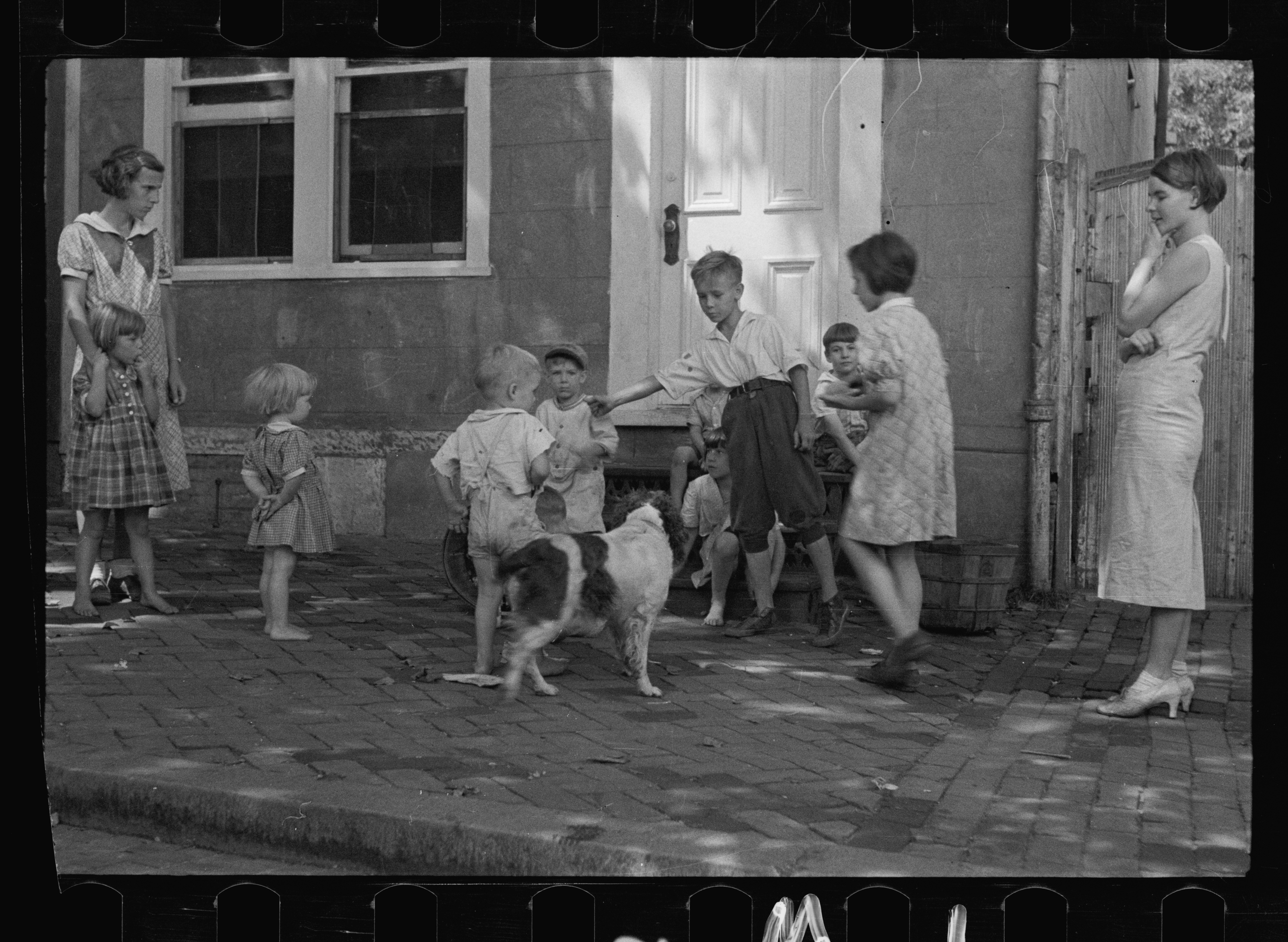
Children playing on sidewalk in Georgetown during the Great Depression, photographed by Carl Mydans in 1935

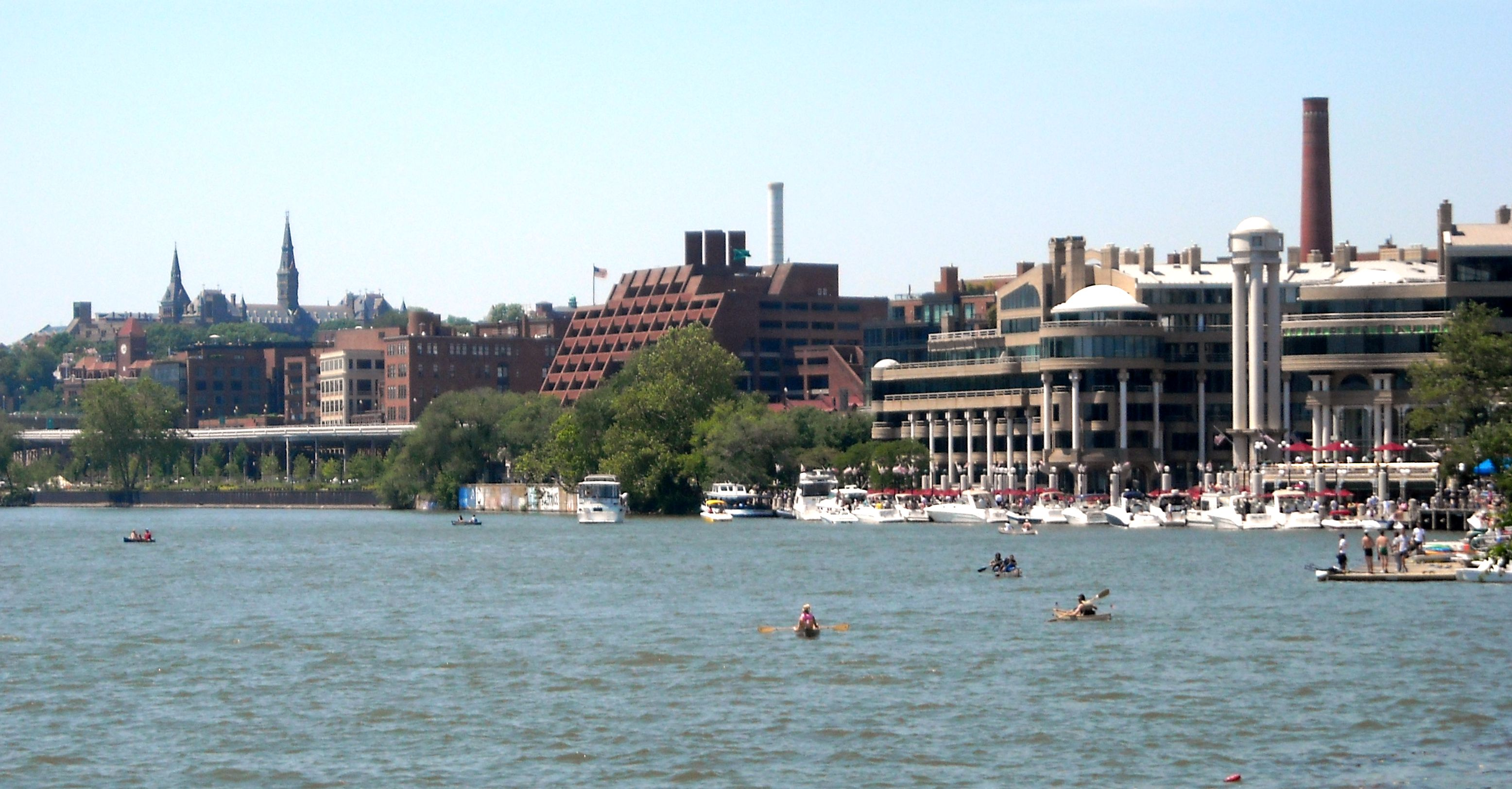
Washington Harbour complex located on the Potomac River with Georgetown University's Healy Hall visible in the background

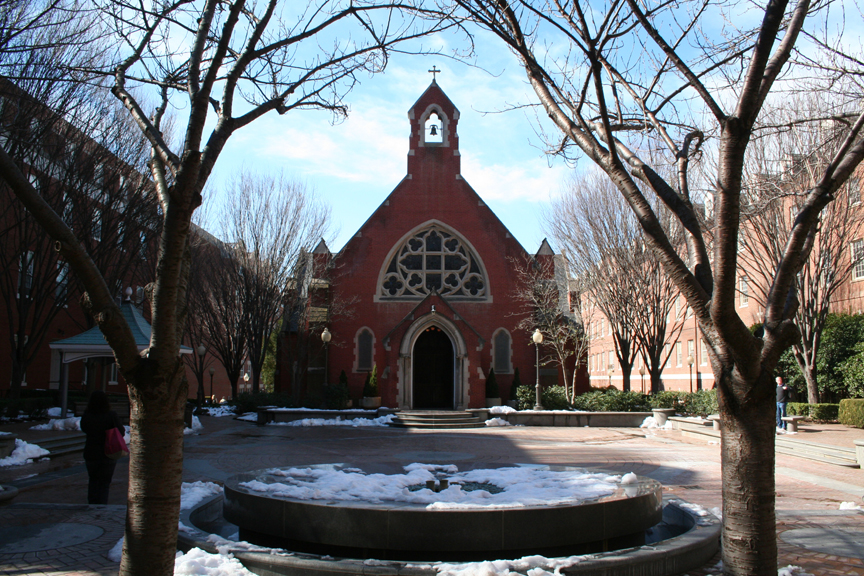
Dahlgren Chapel at Georgetown University

Located on the Atlantic Seaboard Fall Line, Georgetown was at the head of navigation on the Potomac River, the farthest point upstream that boats coming from the Atlantic Ocean could navigate.

=== 17th century ===
In 1632, English fur trader Henry Fleet documented an American Indian village of the Nacotchtank people called Tohoga on the site of present-day Georgetown and established trade there. The area was then part of the Province of Maryland, an English colony.

=== 18th century ===
In approximately 1745, George Gordon constructed a tobacco inspection house along the Potomac River on a site that was already a tobacco trading post when the inspection house was built. Warehouses, wharves, and other buildings were then constructed around the inspection house, and it quickly became a small community. Georgetown grew as thriving port, facilitating trade and shipments of goods to and from the colonial-era Province of Maryland.

In 1751, the legislature of the Province of Maryland authorized the purchase of 60 acres (240,000 m^{2}) of land from Gordon and George Beall for £280. A survey of the town was completed in February 1752.

Georgetown was founded during the reign of King George II, and some speculate that the town was named after him. A second theory is that the town was named after its founders, George Gordon and George Beall. The Maryland Legislature issued a charter and incorporated the town in 1789. Although Georgetown was never officially made a city, it was later referred to as the "City of Georgetown" in several 19th-century Acts of Congress. Robert Peter, an early area merchant in the tobacco trade, became the town's first mayor in 1790.

John Beatty established the first church in Georgetown, a Lutheran church on High Street. Stephen Bloomer Balch established a Presbyterian church in 1784. A Catholic Church, Trinity Catholic Church, was built in 1795, along with a parish school-house. Construction of St. John's Episcopal Church began in 1797 but paused for financial reasons until 1803, and the church was finally consecrated in 1809. Banks in Georgetown included the Farmers and Mechanics Bank, which was established in 1814. Other banks included the Bank of Washington, Patriotic Bank, Bank of the Metropolis, and the Union and Central Banks of Georgetown.

Newspapers in Georgetown included the Republican Weekly Ledger, which was the first paper, started in 1790. The Sentinel was first published in 1796 by Green, English & Co. Charles C. Fulton began publishing the Potomac Advocate, which was started by Thomas Turner. Other newspapers in Georgetown included the Georgetown Courier and the Federal Republican. William B. Magruder, the first postmaster, was appointed on February 16, 1790, and in 1795, a custom house was established on Water Street. General James M. Lingan served as the first collector of the port.

In the 1790s, City Tavern, the Union Tavern, and the Columbian Inn opened and were popular throughout the 19th century. Among these taverns, only the City Tavern remains today, serving as a private social club and known as City Tavern Club, located near the corner of Wisconsin Avenue and M Street.

George Washington frequented Georgetown, including Suter's Tavern, where he negotiated many deals to acquire land for the new national capital. A key figure in the land deals was a local merchant named Benjamin Stoddert, who arrived in Georgetown in 1783. He had previously served as Secretary to the Board of War under the Articles of Confederation. Stoddert partnered with General Uriah Forrest to become an original proprietor of the Potomac Company.

Stoddert and other Potomac landowners agreed to a land transfer deal to the federal government at a dinner at Forrest's home in Georgetown on March 28, 1791. Stoddert bought land within the boundaries of the federal district, some of it at the request of Washington for the government, and some on speculation. He also purchased stock in the federal government under Hamilton's assumption-of-debt plan. The speculative purchases were not, however, profitable and caused Stoddert much difficulty before his appointment as Secretary of the Navy by John Adams, the nation's second president. Stoddert was rescued from his debts with the help of William Marbury, a Georgetown resident who later was a plaintiff in the landmark case Marbury v. Madison. Stoddert ultimately purchased Halcyon House at the corner of 34th and Prospect Streets. The Forrest-Marbury House on M Street is currently the embassy of Ukraine.

=== 19th century ===
In 1800, the federal capital was moved from the revolutionary capital of Philadelphia to Washington, D.C., and Georgetown became an independent municipal government within the District of Columbia, of which there were three: Alexandria, D.C., Georgetown, D.C., and Washington, D.C. Georgetown, D.C., was in the new Washington County, D.C.; the District's other county was Alexandria County, D.C., now Arlington County, Virginia, and the independent city of Alexandria, Virginia.

By the 1820s, the Potomac River had become silted up and was not navigable up to Georgetown. Construction of the Chesapeake & Ohio Canal began in July 1828, to link Georgetown to Harper's Ferry, Virginia in present-day West Virginia. But the canal was soon in a race with the Baltimore and Ohio Railroad and got to Cumberland eight years after the railroad, a faster mode of transport, and at the cost of $77,041,586. It was never profitable. From its beginning to December 1876, the canal earned $35,659,055 in revenue, while expending $35,746,301.

The canal provided an economic boost for Georgetown. In the 1820s and 1830s, Georgetown was an sizable shipping center. Tobacco and other goods were transferred between the canal and shipping on the Potomac River; salt was imported from Europe, and sugar and molasses were imported from the West Indies. These shipping industries were later superseded by coal and flour industries, which flourished with the C & O Canal providing cheap power for mills and other industry. In 1862, the Washington and Georgetown Railroad Company began a horsecar line running along M Street in Georgetown and Pennsylvania Avenue in Washington, easing travel between the two cities.

The municipal governments of Georgetown and the City and County of Washington were formally revoked by Congress effective June 1, 1871, at which point its governmental powers were vested within the District of Columbia. The streets in Georgetown were renamed in 1895 to conform to the street names in use in Washington.

In the 1850s, Georgetown had a large African American population, including both slaves and free blacks. Slave labor was widely used in construction of new buildings in Washington, in addition, to provide labor on tobacco plantations in Maryland and Virginia. Slave trading in Georgetown began in 1760 when John Beattie established his business on O Street and conducted business at other locations around Wisconsin Avenue. Other slave markets ("pens") were located in Georgetown, including one at McCandless' Tavern near M Street and Wisconsin Avenue. Slave trading continued until 1850, when it was banned in the District as one element of the Compromise of 1850. Congress abolished ownership of slaves in the entire District on April 16, 1862, annually observed today as Emancipation Day. Many African Americans moved to Georgetown following the Civil War, establishing a thriving community.

By the late 19th century, flour milling and other industries in Georgetown were declining, in part due to the fact that the canals and other waterways continually silted up. Nathaniel Michler and S.T. Abert led efforts to dredge the channels and remove rocks around the Georgetown harbor, though these were temporary solutions and Congress showed little interest in the issue. An 1890 flood and expansion of the railroads brought destitution to the C&O Canal, and Georgetown's waterfront became more industrialized, with narrow alleys, warehouses, and apartment dwellings which lacked plumbing or electricity. Shipping trade vanished between the Civil War and World War I. As a result, many older homes were preserved relatively unchanged.

In the late 18th century and 19th century, African Americans comprised a substantial portion of Georgetown's population, with a large number centered around Herring Hill in the far eastern section near Rock Creek Park. The 1800 census reported the population in Georgetown at 5,120, which included 1,449 slaves and 227 free blacks. A testament to the African-American history that remains today is the Mount Zion United Methodist Church, which is the oldest African-American congregation in Washington. Prior to establishing the church, free blacks and slaves went to the Dumbarton Methodist Church where they were restricted to a hot, overcrowded balcony. The church was originally located in a small brick meetinghouse on 27th Street, but it was destroyed by fire in the 1880s. The church was rebuilt on the present site. Mount Zion Cemetery offered free burials for Washington's earlier African-American population. "From a pre-Civil War population of 6,798 whites, 1,358 free Negroes, and 577 slaves, Georgetown's population had grown to 17,300 but half these residents were poverty-stricken Negroes." Other black churches in Georgetown included Alexander Memorial Baptist Church, First Baptist Church, Jerusalem Baptist Church, and Epiphany Catholic Church.

=== 20th century ===
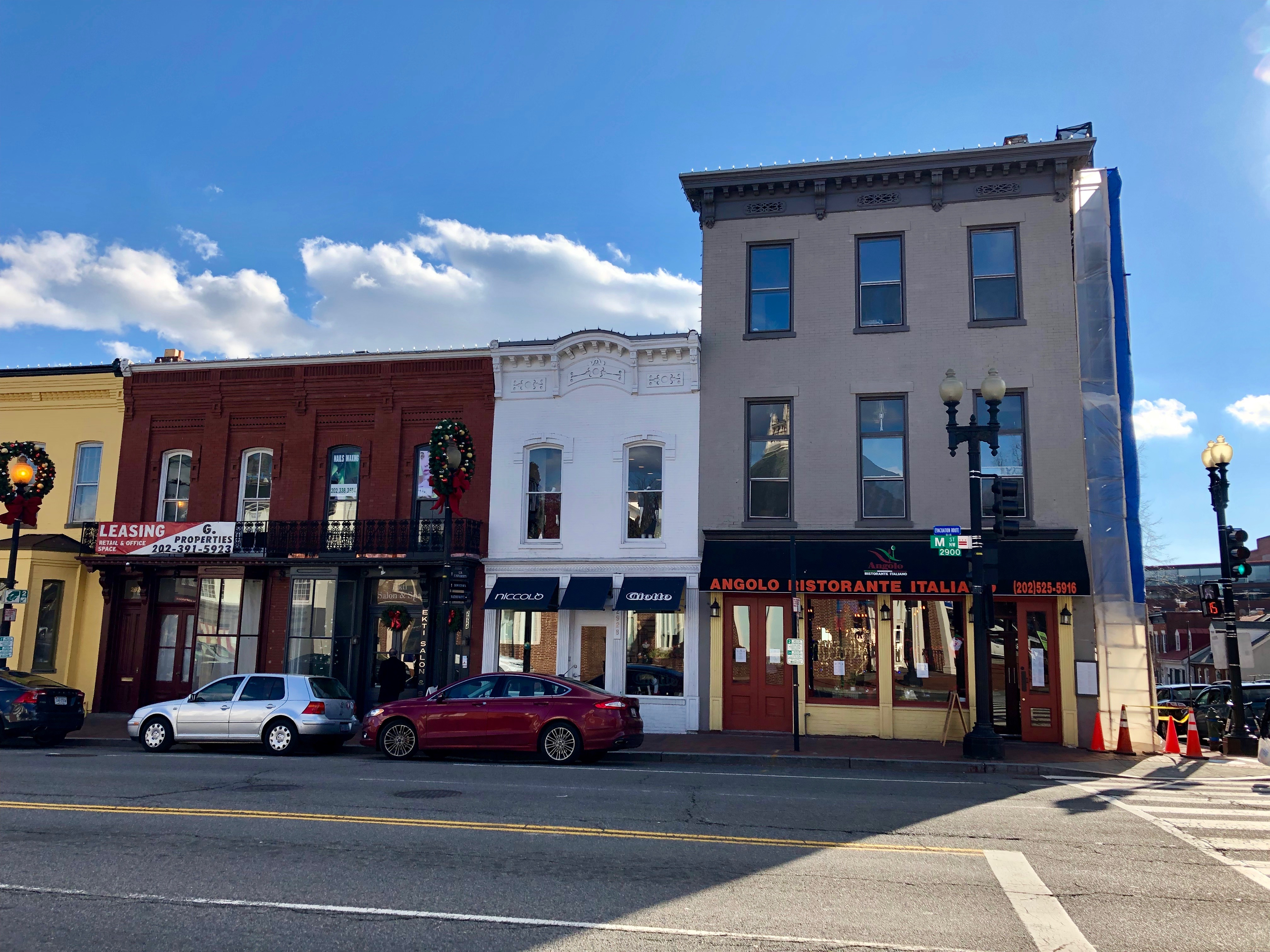
Georgetown is Washington's main shopping district and a major tourist attraction.

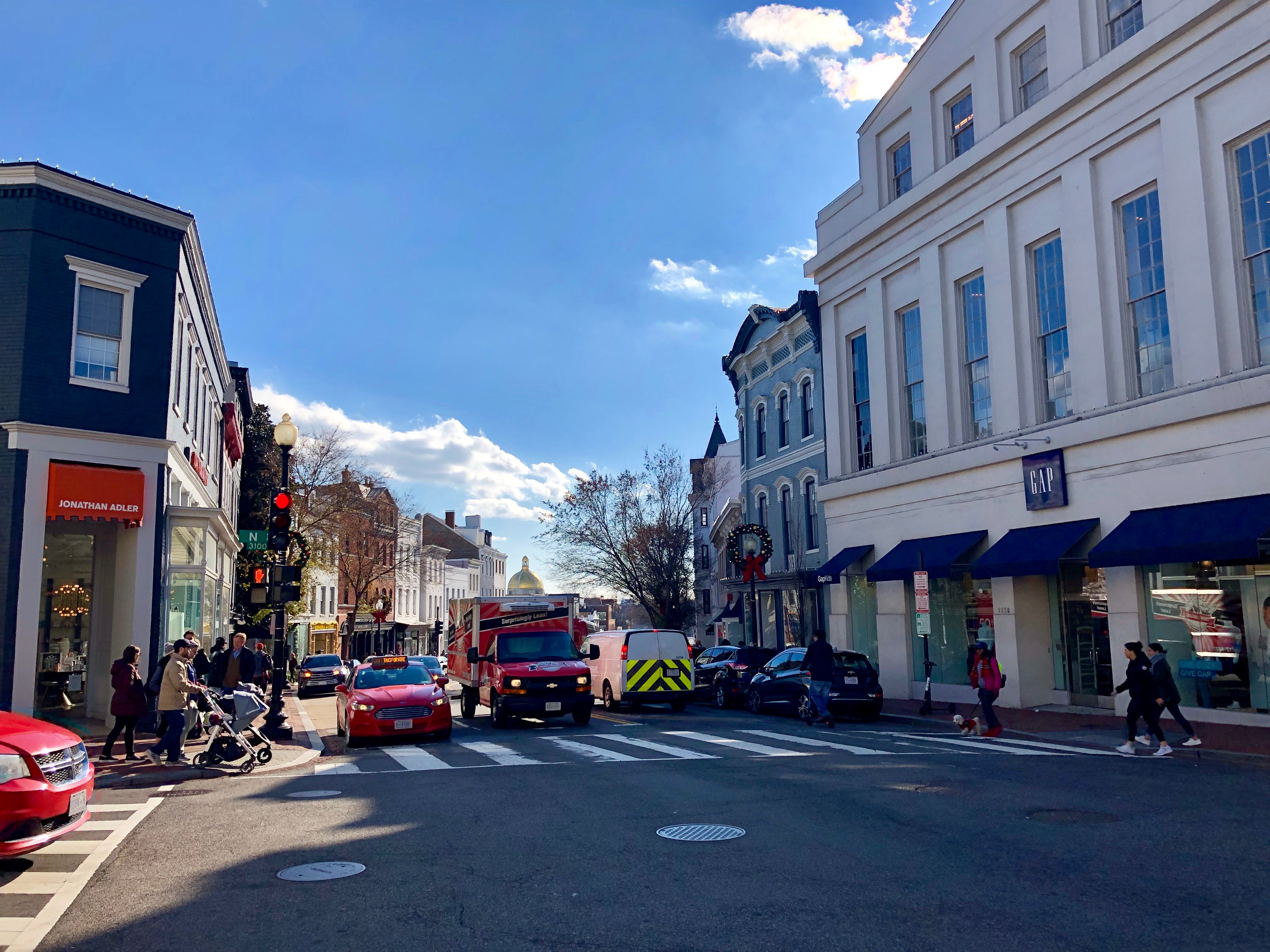
Storefronts on Wisconsin Avenue decorated for Christmas

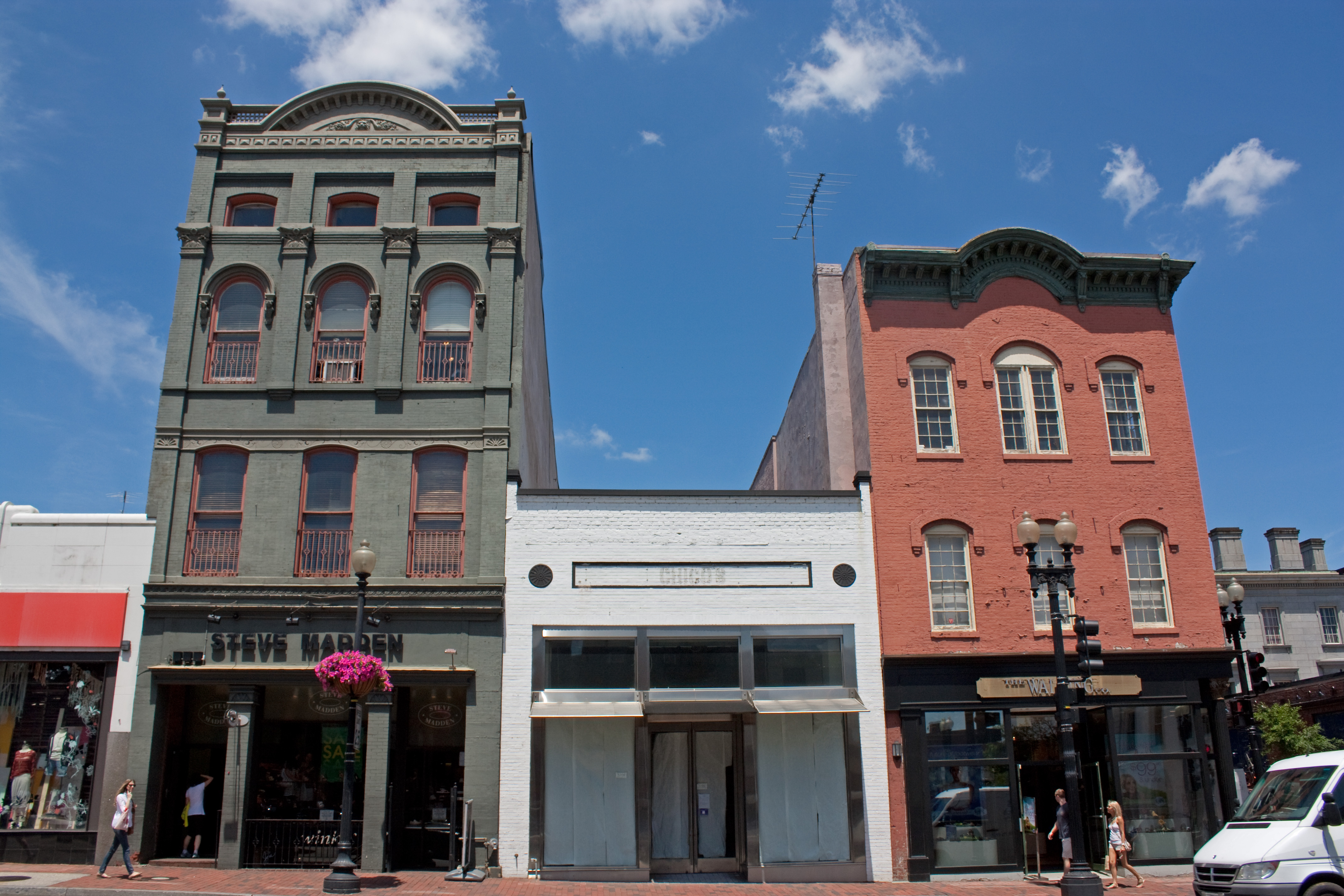
Storefronts on M Street

In 1915, the Buffalo Bridge on present-day Q Street opened and connected this part of Georgetown with the rest of the city east of Rock Creek Park. New construction of large apartment buildings began on the edge of Georgetown. In the early 1920s, John Ihlder led efforts to take advantage of new zoning laws to get restrictions enacted on construction in Georgetown. In 1933, a study by Horace Peaslee and Allied Architects laid out ideas for how Georgetown could be preserved.

The Chesapeake and Ohio Canal, then owned by the Baltimore and Ohio Railroad, formally ceased operations in March 1924. After severe flooding in 1936, Baltimore and Ohio Railroad sold the canal to the National Park Service in October 1938. The waterfront area retained its industrial character in the first half of the 20th century. Georgetown was home to a lumber yard, a cement works, the Washington Flour mill, and a meat rendering plant, with incinerator smokestacks and a power generating plant for the old Capital Traction streetcar system, located at the foot of Wisconsin Avenue, which closed in 1935, and was demolished in October 1968. In 1949, the city constructed the Whitehurst Freeway, an elevated highway above K Street, to allow motorists entering the District over the Key Bridge to bypass Georgetown entirely on their way downtown.

In 1950, Public Law 808 was passed, establishing the historic district of "Old Georgetown". The law required that the United States Commission of Fine Arts be consulted on any alteration, demolition, or building construction within the historic district.

In 1967, the Georgetown Historic District was listed on the U.S. National Register of Historic Places.

=== 21st century ===
Georgetown is home to many politicians and lobbyists. Georgetown's landmark waterfront district was further revitalized in 2003, and includes a Ritz-Carlton, Four Seasons, and other hotels. Georgetown's highly traveled commercial district is home to a variety of specialty retailers and fashionable boutiques.

== Geography ==
Georgetown is bounded by the Potomac River to the south, Rock Creek to the east, Burleith, Glover Park, and Observatory Circle to the north, and Georgetown University to the west. Much of Georgetown is surrounded by parkland and green space that serve as buffers from development in adjacent neighborhoods, and provide recreation. Rock Creek Park, Oak Hill Cemetery, Montrose Park, and Dumbarton Oaks are located along the north and east edge of Georgetown, east of Wisconsin Avenue. The neighborhood is situated on bluffs overlooking the Potomac River. As a result, there are some rather steep grades on streets running north–south. The famous "Exorcist steps" connecting M Street to Prospect Street were necessitated by the hilly terrain of the neighborhood.

The primary commercial corridors of Georgetown are M Street and Wisconsin Avenue, whose high fashion stores draw large numbers of tourists as well as local shoppers year-round. There is also the Washington Harbour complex on K Street, on the waterfront, featuring outdoor bars and restaurants popular for viewing boat races. Between M and K Streets runs the historic Chesapeake and Ohio Canal, today plied only by tour boats; adjacent trails are popular with joggers or strollers.

== Education ==
=== Primary and secondary education ===
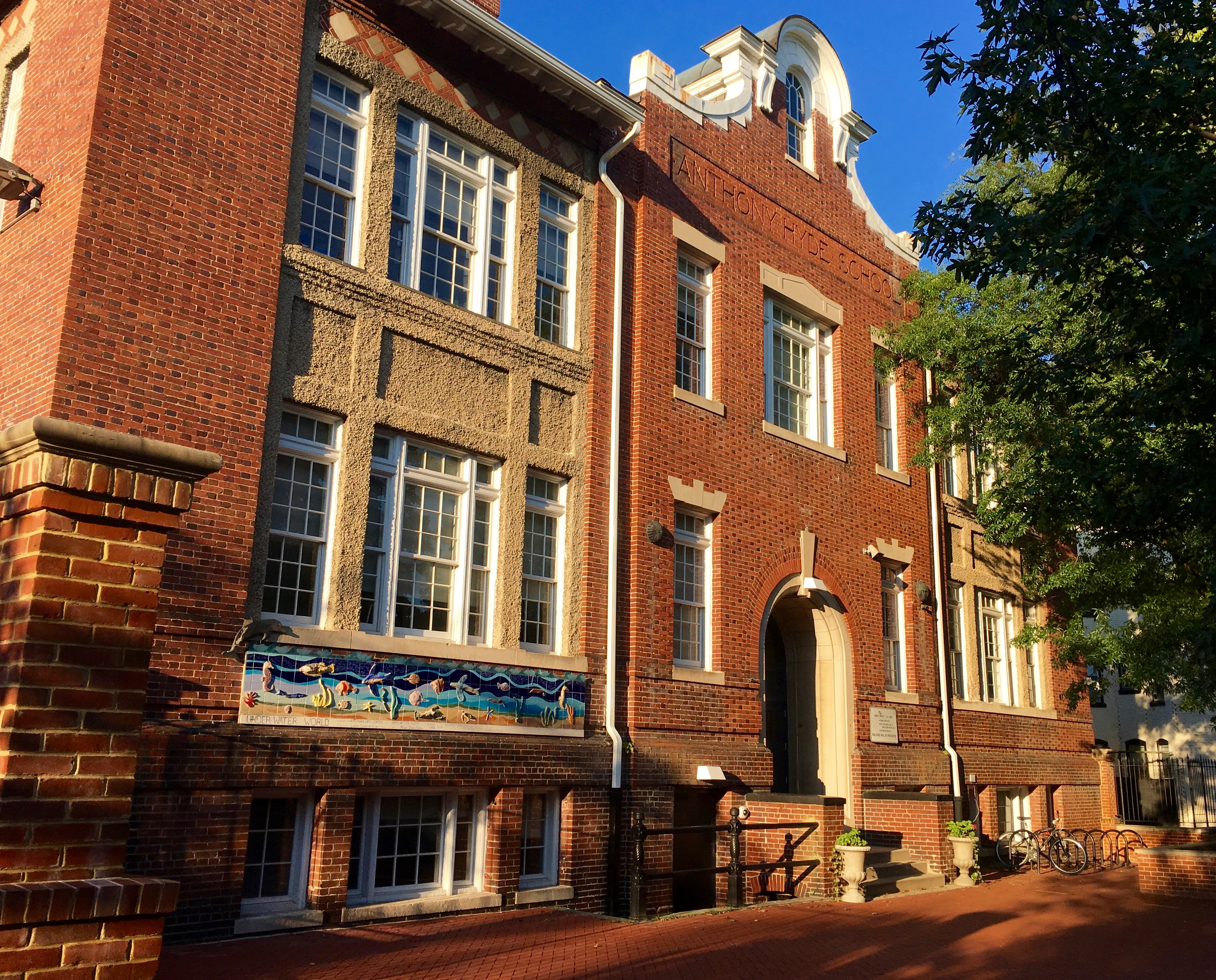
Hyde-Addison School

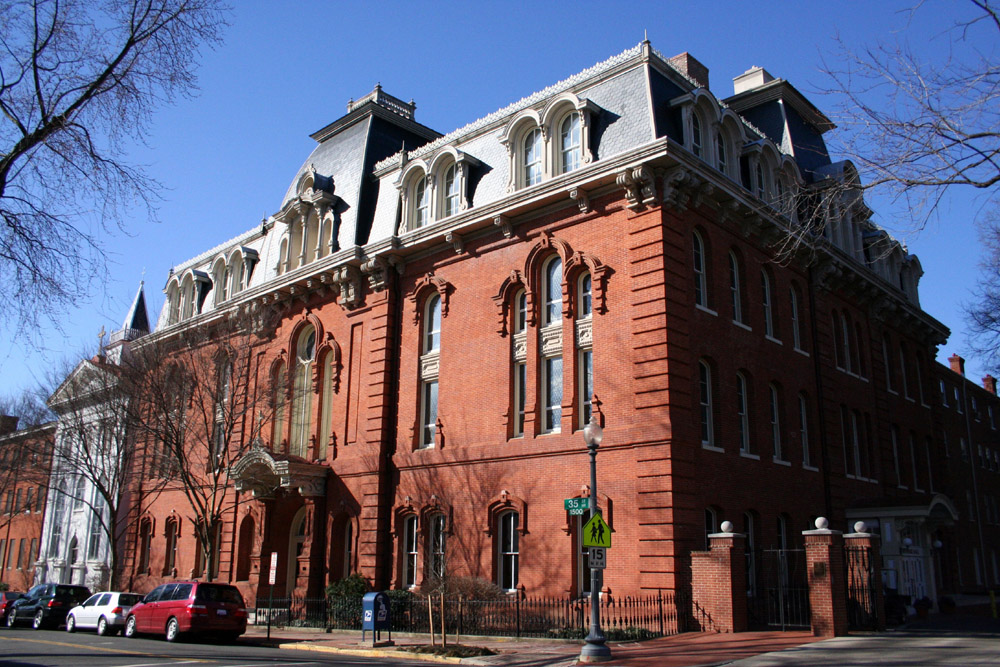
Georgetown Visitation Preparatory School

Throughout the 18th, 19th, and 20th centuries, the concentration of wealth in Georgetown sparked the growth of many university-preparatory schools in and around the neighborhood. One of the first schools was the Columbian Academy on N Street, which was established in 1781 with Reverend Stephen Balch serving as the headmaster.

Private schools currently located in Georgetown include Georgetown Visitation Preparatory School, while nearby is the eponymous Georgetown Day School. Georgetown Preparatory School, while founded in Georgetown, moved in 1915 to its present location several miles north of Georgetown in Montgomery County.

District of Columbia Public Schools operates area public schools, including Hyde-Addison Elementary School on O Street. Hyde-Addison formed from merging two adjacent schools - Hyde Elementary and Addison Elementary. The Addison section was renovated in 2008 and the Hyde section was renovated in Summer 2014. An addition connecting the two buildings is scheduled for completion in Summer 2019. Hardy Middle School and Jackson-Reed High School both serve Georgetown as zoned secondary schools. Duke Ellington School of the Arts, a public magnet school, is in the community.

=== Georgetown University ===
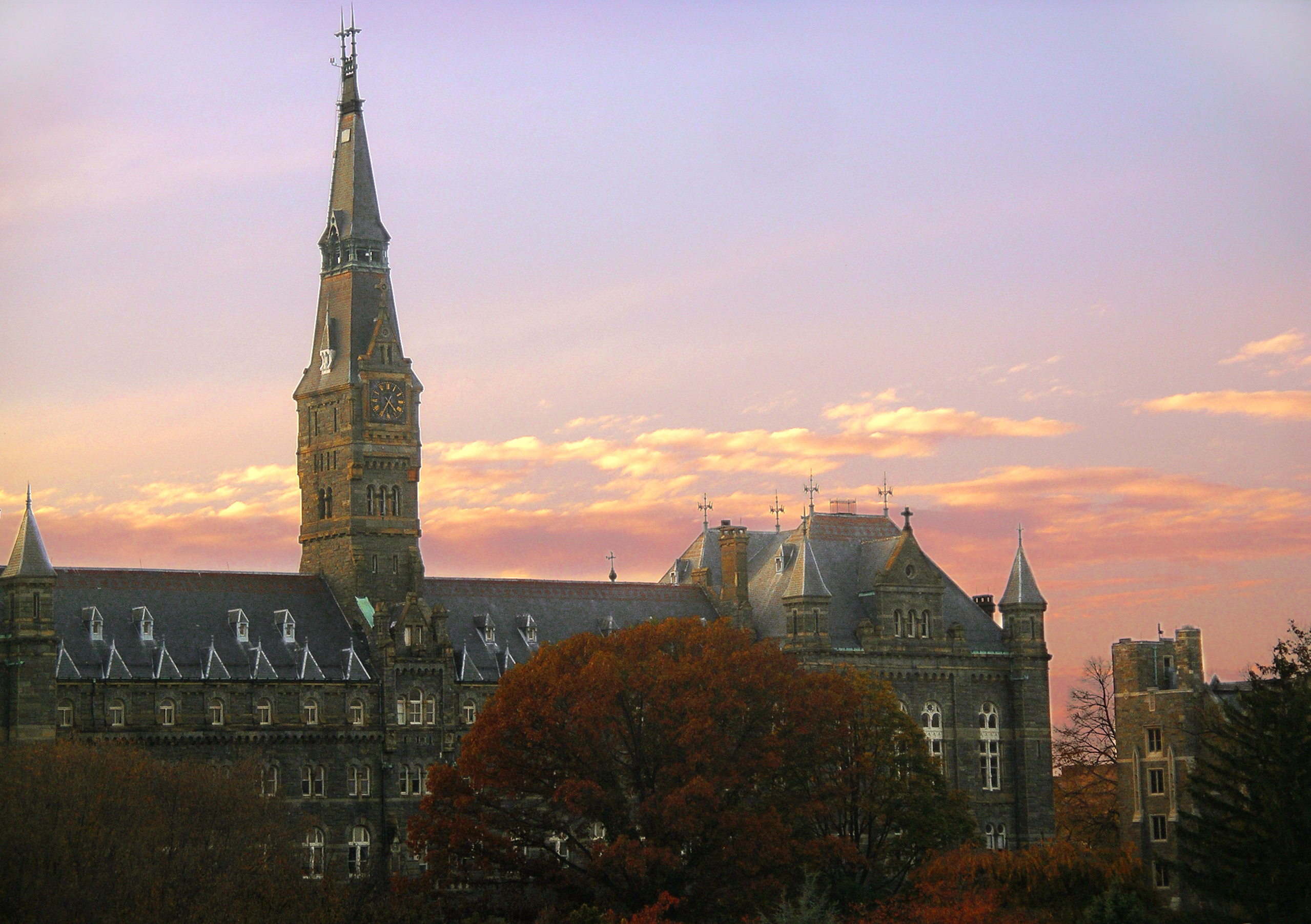
Healy Hall at Georgetown University

The main campus of Georgetown University is located on the western edge of the Georgetown neighborhood. Father John Carroll founded Georgetown University as a Jesuit private university in 1789, though its roots extend back to 1634. Although the school struggled financially in its early years, Georgetown expanded into a branched university after the American Civil War under the leadership of university president Patrick Francis Healy. As of 2007, the university has 6,853 undergraduate students and 4,490 graduate students on the main campus.

The main campus is just over 102 acres (41 ha) in area and includes 58 buildings, student residences capable of accommodating 80 percent of undergraduates, various athletic facilities, and the medical school. Most buildings employ collegiate Gothic architecture and Georgian brick architecture. Campus green areas include fountains, a cemetery, large clusters of flowers, groves of trees, and open quadrangles. The main campus has traditionally centered on Dahlgren Quadrangle, although Red Square has replaced it as the focus of student life. Healy Hall, built in Flemish Romanesque style from 1877 to 1879, is the architectural gem of Georgetown's campus, and is a National Historic Landmark.

The 1973 film The Exorcist was partly filmed at Georgetown University and the surrounding area. The Exorcist steps, the stairway that the character Father Damien fell down, connects Prospect Street, on the edge of the campus, and M Street.

=== Public libraries ===
The Georgetown Neighborhood Library

The District of Columbia Public Library operates the Georgetown Neighborhood Library, which originally opened at 3260 R St. NW in October 1935 on the site of the former Georgetown Reservoir. An earlier public library in Georgetown was endowed by financier George Peabody in 1867 and opened in a room of the Curtis School on O Street opposite St. John's Church in 1875. In the early 1930s, a library committee was formed to encourage the establishment of a new public library branch in Georgetown.

The building was severely damaged by a fire on April 30, 2007, and underwent a $17.9 million renovation and expansion. The building was then re-opened on October 18, 2010, with a LEED-Silver Certification from the U.S. Green Building Council. A newly constructed, climate-controlled third floor now houses the collections of the original Peabody Library and is a center for research on Georgetown history.

== Transportation ==
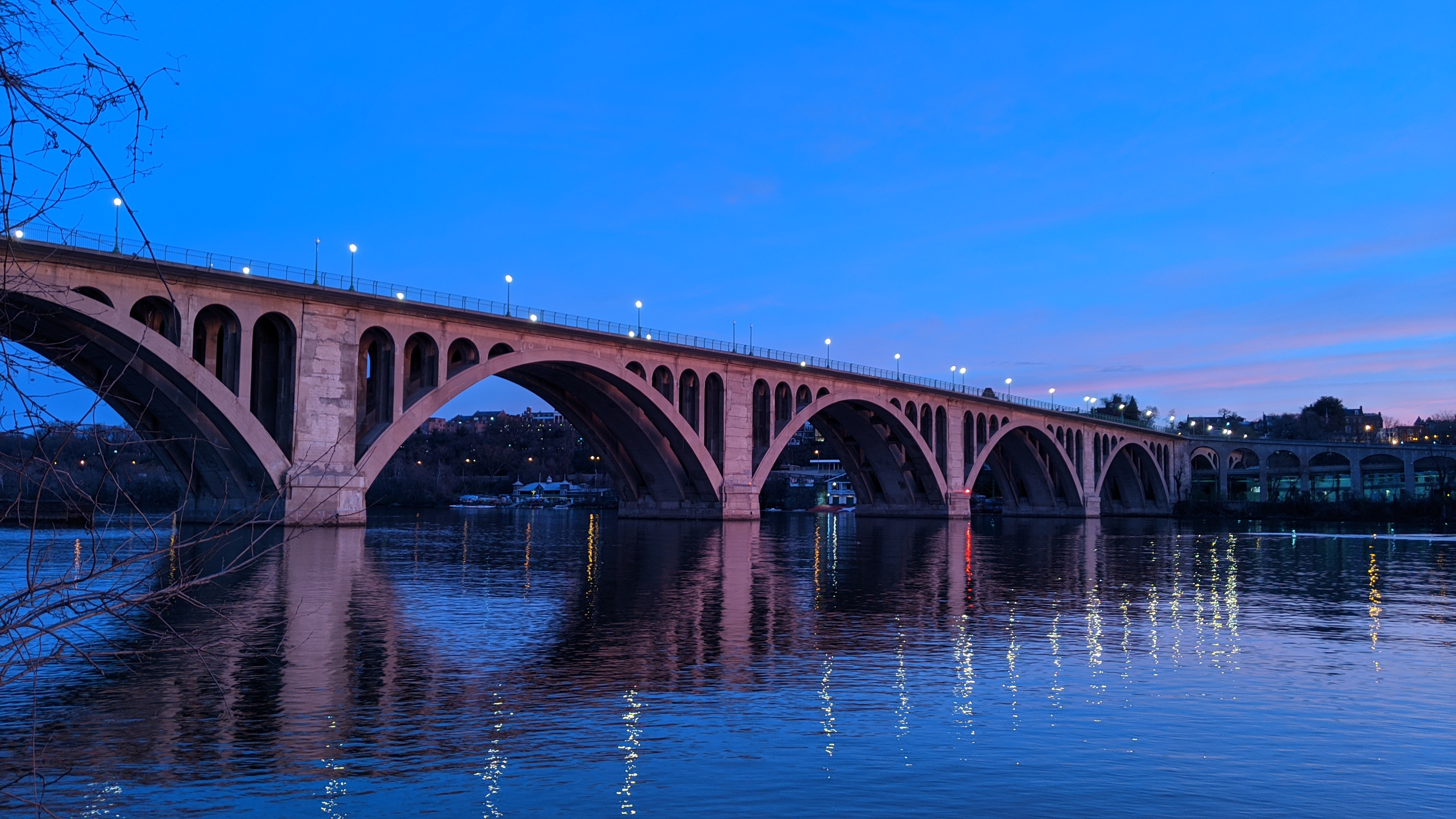
Key Bridge, which crosses the Potomac River, connects Georgetown with the Rosslyn section of Arlington, Virginia.

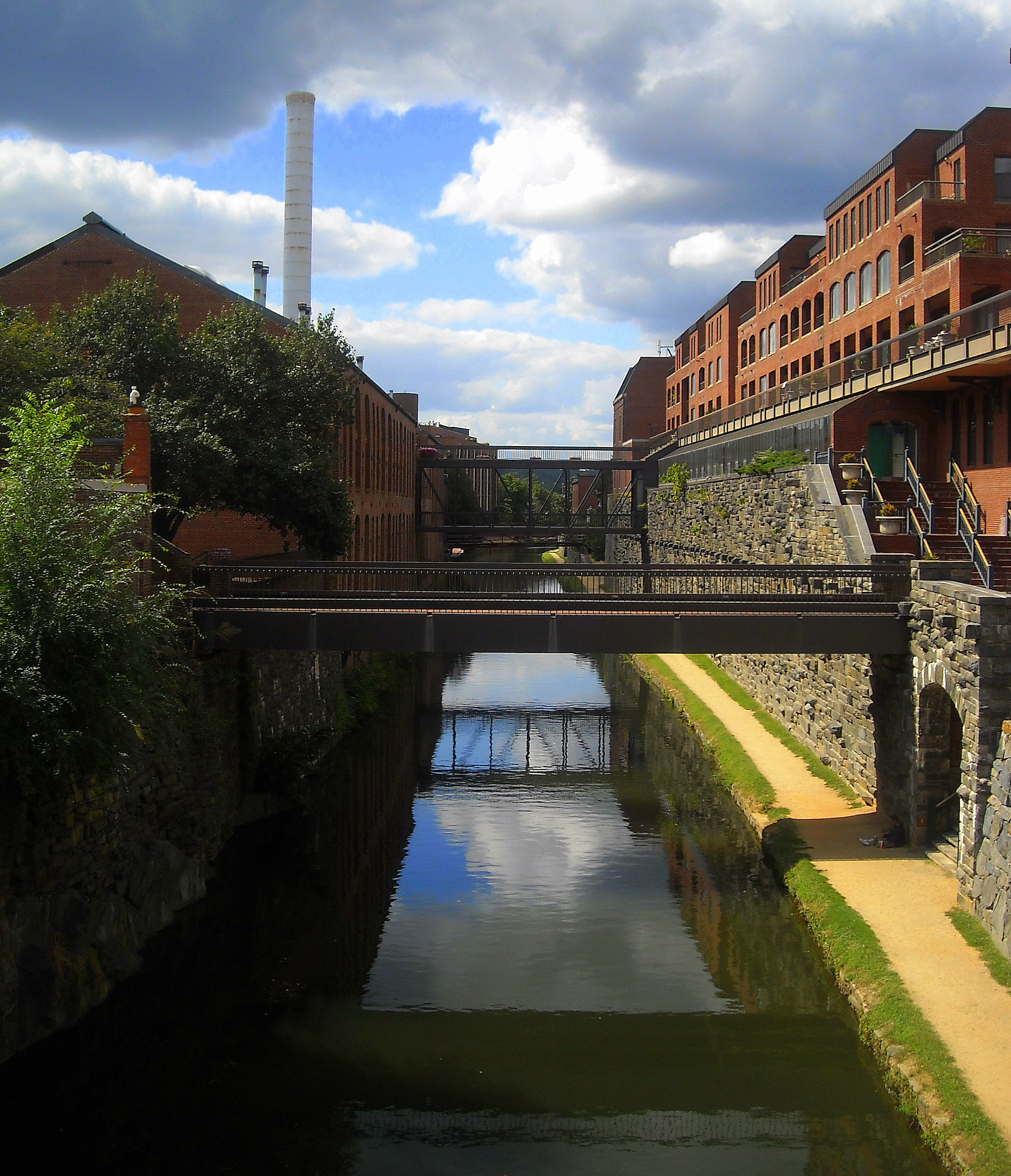
Chesapeake and Ohio Canal passing through Georgetown

Georgetown's transportation importance was defined by its location just below the fall line of the Potomac River. The Aqueduct Bridge (and later, the Francis Scott Key Bridge) connected Georgetown with Virginia. Before the Aqueduct Bridge was built, a ferry service owned by John Mason connected Georgetown to Virginia. In 1788, a bridge was constructed over Rock Creek to connect Bridge Street (M Street) with the Federal City.

Georgetown was located at the juncture of the Alexandria Canal and the Chesapeake and Ohio Canal. The C&O Canal, begun in Georgetown in 1829, reached Cumberland, Maryland in 1851, and operated until 1924. Wisconsin Avenue is on the alignment of the tobacco hogshead rolling road from rural Maryland, and the Federal Customs House was located on 31st Street (now utilized as the post office). The city's oldest bridge, the sandstone bridge which carries Wisconsin Avenue over the C&O Canal, and which dates to 1831, was reopened to traffic on May 16, 2007, after a $3.5 million restoration. It is the only remaining bridge of five constructed in Georgetown by the Chesapeake & Ohio Canal Company.

Several streetcar lines and interurban railways interchanged passengers in Georgetown at and near the Georgetown Car Barn, which the Capital Traction Company operated near the end of the Aqueduct Bridge and later, the Key Bridge (see Streetcars in Washington, D.C.). A station serving the Great Falls and Old Dominion Railroad and its successor, the Washington and Old Dominion Railway, was located in front of a stone wall on Canal Road adjacent to the Exorcist steps, immediately west of the Car Barn, from 1912 to 1923.

Five suburban Virginia lines, connecting in Rosslyn, provided links from the Washington, D.C. streetcar network to Arlington National Cemetery, Fort Myer, Nauck, Alexandria, Mount Vernon, Clarendon, Ballston, Falls Church, Vienna, Fairfax, Leesburg, Bluemont, and Great Falls (see Northern Virginia trolleys). Streetcar operations in Washington, D.C. ended on January 28, 1962.

In 1910, the Baltimore and Ohio Railroad completed an 11-mile branch line from Silver Spring, Maryland, to Water Street in Georgetown in an abortive attempt to construct a southern connection to Alexandria, Virginia. The line served as an industrial line, shipping coal to a General Services Administration power plant on K Street (now razed) until 1985. The abandoned right-of-way has since been converted into the Capital Crescent Trail, a rails-to-trails route, and the power plant replaced by a condo.

=== Proposals for a Metro station ===
There is no Metro station in Georgetown. Some residents opposed building one but no serious plans for a station existed in the first place, primarily due to the engineering issues presented by the extremely steep grade from the Potomac River (under which the subway tunnel would run) to the center of Georgetown, very close to the river. The planners expected the Metro to serve rush-hour commuters, and the neighborhood has few apartments, office buildings, or automobile parking areas.

Since the Metro's opening, there have been occasional discussions about adding another subway line and tunnel under the Potomac to service the area. Three stations are located roughly one mile (1.6 km) from the center of Georgetown: Rosslyn (across the Key Bridge in Arlington), Foggy Bottom-GWU, and Dupont Circle. As of July 2025, Georgetown is served by the Crosstown (C91, C85), Downtown (D80, D82), and Arlington-bound (A58) Metrobuses.

== Historic district and historic landmarks ==
- Georgetown Historic District
- U.S. National Register of Historic Places
- U.S. National Historic Landmark District
- D.C. Inventory of Historic Sites
- Location: Roughly bounded by Whitehaven Street, Rock Creek Park, the Potomac River, and the Georgetown University campus
- Coordinates: 38°54′34″N 77°3′54″W
- Area: 750 acres (300 ha)
- NRHP reference No.: 67000025

Significant dates
- Added to NRHP: May 28, 1967
- Designated NHLD: May 28, 1967
- Designated DCIHS: November 8, 1964

The entire Georgetown neighborhood is a designated National Historic Landmark District, known as the Georgetown Historic District. It received this designation in 1967 for its large concentration of well-preserved colonial and Federal period architecture.

Georgetown is also home to several other historic landmarks, including:

- Canal Square Building, 1054 31st Street, NW, former home of the Tabulating Machine Company, a direct precursor of IBM
- The City Tavern Club, built in 1796, is the oldest commercial structure in Washington, D.C.
- The Chesapeake and Ohio Canal, begun in 1829.
- Dumbarton Oaks, 3101 R Street, NW, former home of John C. Calhoun, U.S. vice president, where the United Nations charter was outlined in 1944.
- Evermay, built in 1801 and restored by F. Lammot Belin
- The Forrest-Marbury House, 3350 M Street, NW, where George Washington met with local landowners to acquire the District of Columbia, which is currently the Embassy of Ukraine.
- Georgetown Lutheran Church, founded in 1769, was the first church in Georgetown. The current church structure, the fourth on the site, was built in 1914.
- Georgetown Presbyterian Church was established in 1780 by Reverend Stephen Bloomer Balch. Formerly located on Bridge Street (M Street), the current church building was constructed in 1881 on P Street.
- Healy Hall on Georgetown's campus, built in Flemish Romanesque style from 1877 to 1879 was designated a National Historic Landmark in 1987.
- Mount Zion United Methodist Church and Mount Zion Cemetery
- The Oak Hill Cemetery, a gift of William Wilson Corcoran whose Gothic Revival chapel and gates were designed by James Renwick Jr., was, at one time, the resting place of Abraham Lincoln's son Willie and other figures.
- The Old Stone House, built in 1765, located on M Street is the oldest house in Washington, D.C.
- Tudor Place and Dumbarton Court
- The Volta Laboratory and Bureau, created by Alexander Graham Bell as his first formal research laboratory, the profits from which were used to create a research and educational institution devoted to serving the deaf, which operates today as the Alexander Graham Bell Association for the Deaf and Hard of Hearing, also known as the 'AG Bell'.

== Notable people ==
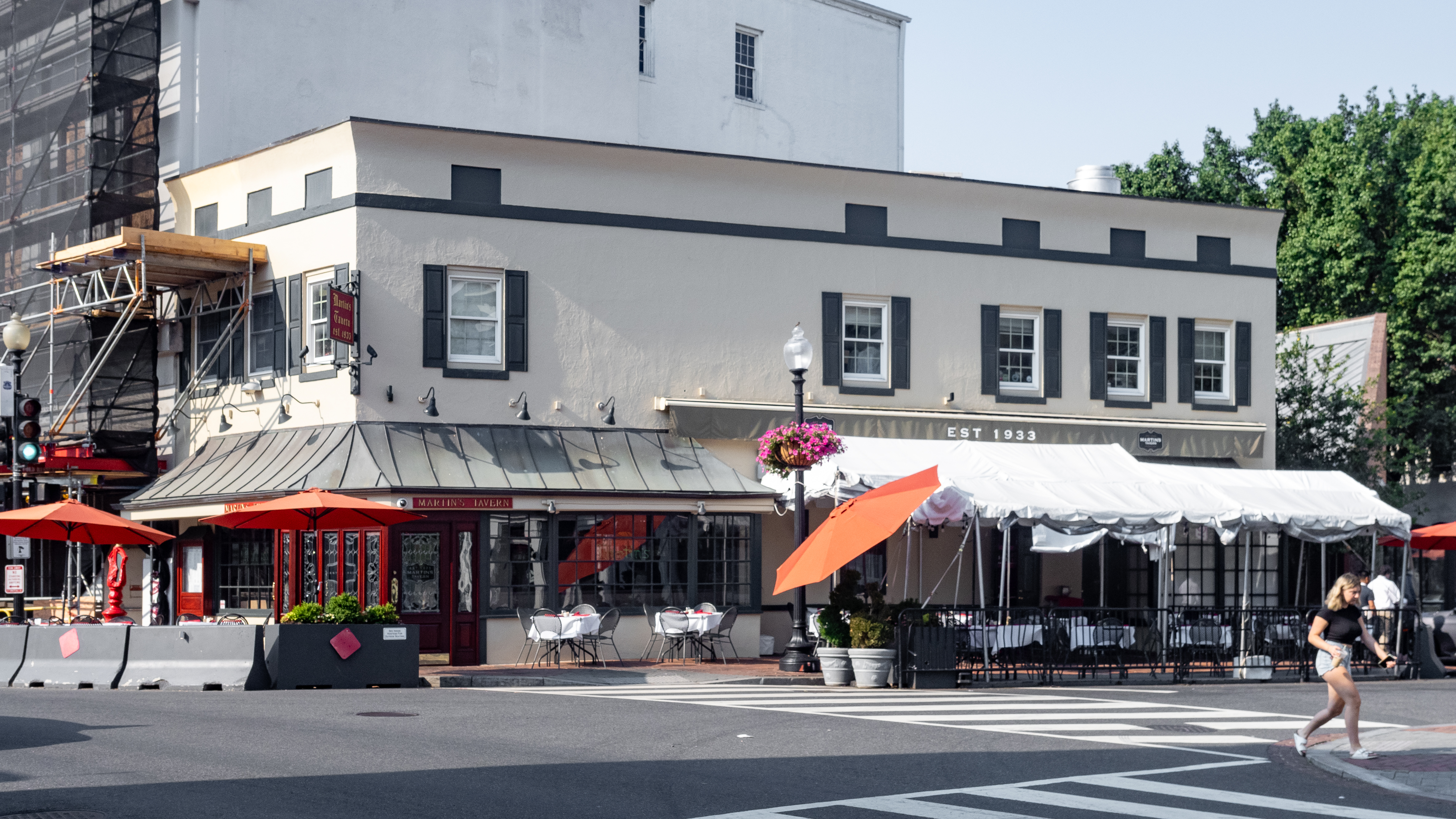
Martin's Tavern, where John F. Kennedy proposed to Jackie in 1953

=== Former residents ===
- Madeleine Albright, former U.S. Secretary of State during the Clinton administration
- Max Baucus, former U.S. Senator from Montana from 1978 to 2014
- Alexander Graham Bell, inventor and scientist, lived in Georgetown briefly due to Congressional and legal hearings related to telephone patents
- Pedro Casanave, Georgetown's fifth mayor who directed the construction of the White House and installed its cornerstone on October 12, 1792
- Julia Child, chef, author, and television personality, lived in Georgetown with her husband Paul. Their first residence, purchased in 1948, was on Olive Street in Georgetown. In 1956, they returned to Georgetown, living in the Olive Street house until they relocated to Cambridge, Massachusetts in 1959.
- Francis Scott Key, attorney, author, and poet who wrote "The Star-Spangled Banner" during the Battle of Baltimore on September 14, 1814
- John F. Kennedy, 35th U.S. president, lived in Georgetown in the 1950s while serving in the U.S. House of Representatives and U.S. Senate. In 1953, Kennedy proposed to Jacqueline Kennedy Onassis at Martin's Tavern at 1264 Wisconsin Avenue in Georgetown. On January 20, 1961, Kennedy departed for his presidential inauguration from his townhouse at 3307 N Street.
- Robert Mueller, former FBI director from 2001 to 2013
- Elizabeth Taylor, actress, who lived in Georgetown during her marriage to U.S. Senator John Warner from 1976 to 1982
- Herman Wouk, Pulitzer Prize-winning author for The Caine Mutiny, resided in Georgetown, where he attended Kesher Israel Congregation, a Georgetown synagogue, between 1964 and 1983 while researching and writing The Winds of War and War and Remembrance, two novels about World War II.
- Olivia Wilde, actress and writer

=== Current residents ===
- John Kerry, former U.S. Secretary of State during the Obama administration
- Bob Woodward, reporter, The Washington Post, whose reporting uncovered the Watergate scandal, leading to the resignation of U.S. president Richard Nixon

== In popular culture ==
=== Film and television ===
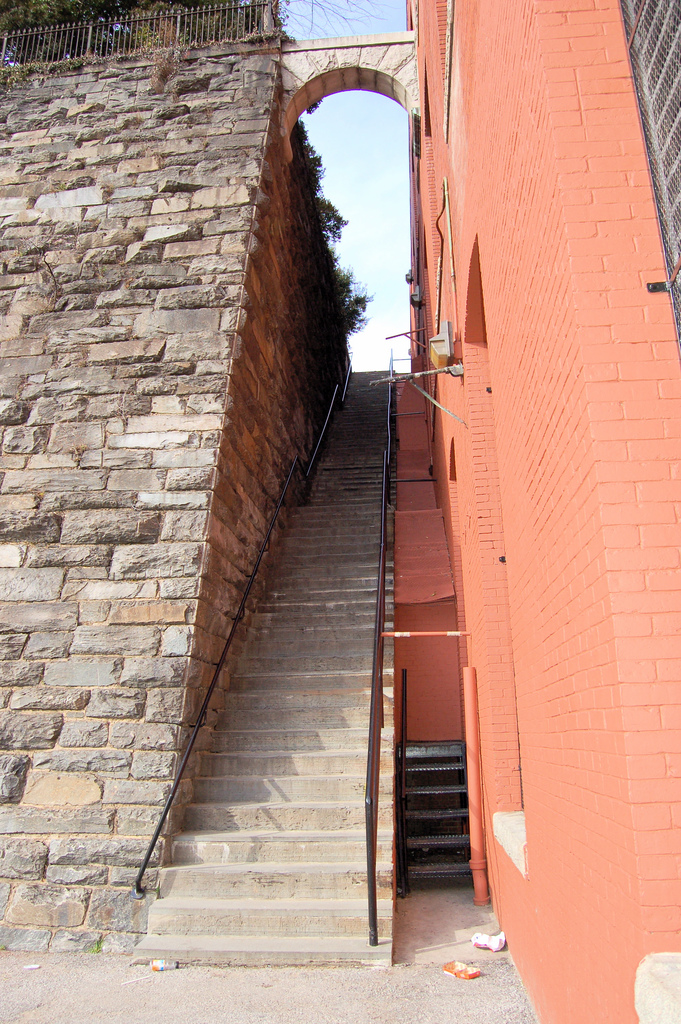
The "Exorcist steps" at Georgetown University

==== 20th century ====
- Topaz (1969, private house)
- The Exorcist (1973, set in Georgetown and partially filmed there. In the movie's climactic scene, the protagonist is hurled down the 75-step staircase at the end of 36th Street NW, which connects Prospect Street with M Street below. The staircase has come to be known as the "Exorcist steps". A false front was built onto the house at the top of the steps so that the bedroom windows would immediately overlook the steps. The real structure is considerably set-back.
- St. Elmo's Fire (1985, set in Georgetown, though the campus fraternity row portions were filmed at the University of Maryland campus in College Park
- No Way Out (1987, featured a Georgetown Metro stop as a plot device, even though no such station exists; the subway station shots were filmed in Baltimore, Maryland. Chase scenes for the movie were shot on the Whitehurst Freeway.
- The Man with One Red Shoe (1985, an early Tom Hanks film)
- Chances Are (1989)
- The Exorcist III (1990)
- Timecop (1994)
- True Lies (1994)
- Dave (1993)
- The Jackal (1997, private homes)
- Enemy of the State (1998)
- Dick (1999, Chesapeake and Ohio Canal)
- Election (1999)

==== 21st century ====
- Spy Game (2001)
- Minority Report (2002)
- The Recruit (2003)
- The Girl Next Door (2004)
- Wedding Crashers (2005)
- Transformers (2007)
- Georgetown (2019)
- Wonder Woman 1984 (2020)
- Burn After Reading (2008) featured Georgetown prominently, but filming was done in Brooklyn.
- The West Wing (1999 to 2006, occasionally filmed scenes in and around Georgetown)
