= William Marbury =

Plaintiff in landmark US Supreme Court case

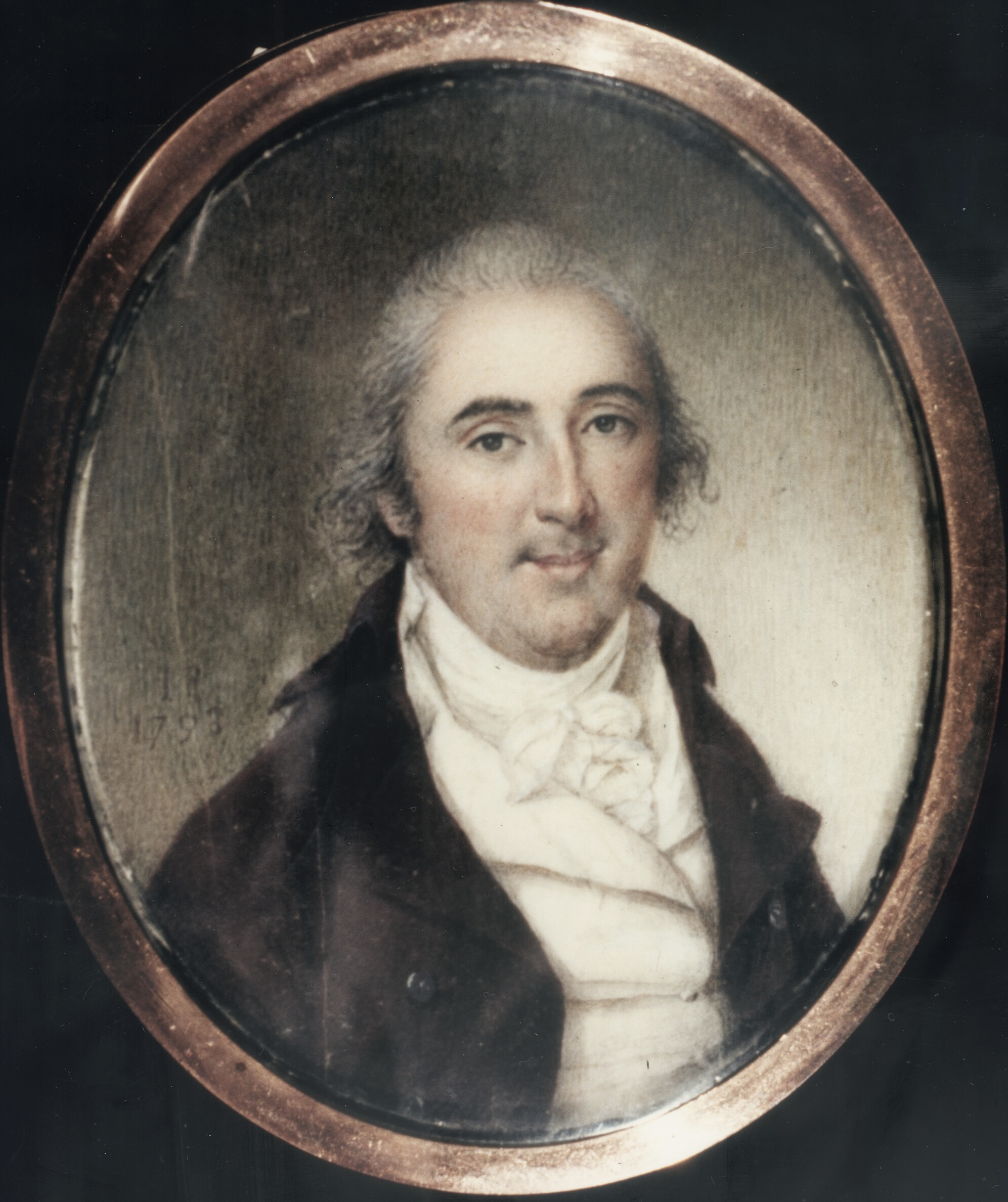
- Miniature portrait by James Peale, c. 1798
- Born: November 7, 1762; Piscataway, Maryland
- Died: March 13, 1835 (aged 72); Washington, D.C.
- Resting place: Oak Hill Cemetery
- Known for: Marbury v. Madison
- Political party: Federalist
- Spouse: Anne Brewer Marbury (m. 1791)

William Marbury (November 7, 1762 – March 13, 1835) was an American businessman and one of the "Midnight Judges" appointed by United States President John Adams the day before he left office. He was then the plaintiff in the landmark 1803 Supreme Court case Marbury v. Madison.

== Background ==
Marbury, son of William and Martha (Marlowe) Marbury, was born November 7, 1762, in Piscataway, Maryland. He spent most of his early life in Maryland around his home.

== Career ==
Marbury became a Georgetown businessman and member of the Federalist Party. In an effort to prevent the incoming party from dismantling his Federalist Party-dominated government, Adams issued 42 judicial appointments, including Marbury's as Justice of the Peace in the District of Columbia, on March 3, 1801, the day before he turned his office over to incoming President Thomas Jefferson. Marbury had actively campaigned for Adams (and against Jefferson) in the presidential election of 1800. Jefferson refused to honor Adams' appointments on the grounds that Adams' paperwork had not been delivered to the proper offices before the change of administration had taken place. Marbury then sued Jefferson's secretary of state, James Madison, in the Supreme Court, asking it issue a writ of mandamus to force the Jefferson administration to honor Adams' appointments.

Marbury's suit led to the Supreme Court case Marbury v. Madison, which utilized the power of Judicial review in its decision. Supreme Court Chief Justice John Marshall did not offer Marbury a legal remedy. Marshall's two-pronged decision averred that while the Court did not have the authority to issue the writ Marbury had requested, it did have the authority to review the constitutionality of actions of the federal executive and legislative branches of government, including those of the Adams and Jefferson administrations.

Whilst the case also held that President Adams' signed commissioned in itself "vested a legal right" - that is, legal title - as a Justice of the Peace (implying he was entitled to pay from that date), Marbury never actually exercised that judicial office. Rather he continued a successful career in finance, banking and securities trading.

== Personal life ==
Marbury married Anne Brewer in 1791; the couple had no children. He died on March 13, 1835, and was buried at Oak Hill Cemetery in Washington, D.C.

== Legacy ==
Marbury's former home in Georgetown is now known as "Forrest-Marbury House" and serves as the Ukrainian Embassy to the United States. Chief Justice Warren Burger placed portraits of William Marbury and James Madison in the small dining room of the Supreme Court, and designated the room "the John Marshall room".

Relatives include William L. Marbury Jr. (1901–1988) of Baltimore, Maryland, who is a distant relative.

== See also ==
- Marbury v. Madison
