= Old Stone House (Washington, D.C.) =

- U.S. National Register of Historic Places
- U.S. National Historic Landmark District – Contributing property
- D.C. Inventory of Historic Sites
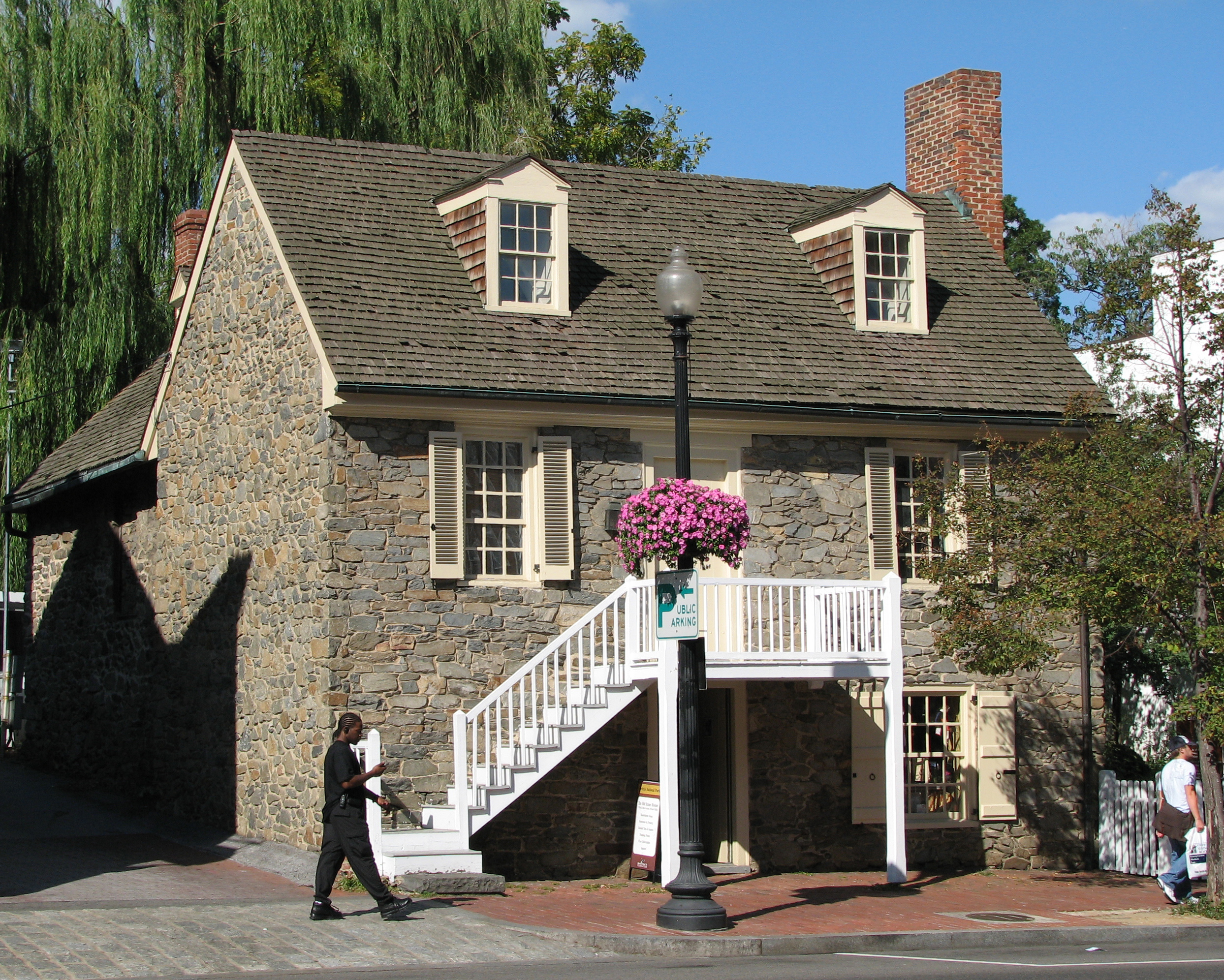
- Old Stone House in the Georgetown section of Washington, D.C. in September 2006

- Location within Washington, D.C. Location within the United States
- Location: 3051 M Street, NW; Washington, D.C., U.S.
- Coordinates: 38°54′20″N 77°3′38″W
- Area: 0.4 acres (0.16 ha)
- Built: 1765; 261 years ago
- Architectural style: Vernacular
- Part of: Georgetown Historic District (ID67000025)
- NRHP reference No.: 73000219

Significant dates
- Added to NRHP: November 30, 1973
- Designated NHLDCP: May 28, 1967
- Designated DCIHS: November 8, 1964

The Old Stone House is one of the oldest structures in Washington, D.C. The house is also the last pre-revolutionary colonial building in Washington, D.C. Built in 1765, Old Stone House is located at 3051 M Street, Northwest in the city's Georgetown neighborhood. Sentimental local folklore preserved the Old Stone House from being demolished, unlike many colonial homes in the area that were replaced by redevelopment.

The Old Stone House was constructed in three phases during the 18th century and is an example of vernacular architecture. The house was built as a one-story structure. Additions were later made, and it was used both as a residence and for business.

In the mid-20th century, at one time, it was the site of a used-car dealership. After acquisition and renovation by the National Park Service (NPS) in the 1950s, the Old Stone House was adapted as a house museum. The Old Stone House stands among the neighborhood's stores and restaurants. The building is considered part of the Rock Creek Parkway urban natural area and was listed on the National Register of Historic Places in 1973. The Old Stone House is also a contributing property to the Georgetown Historic District, a National Historic Landmark. Today, the home is 85% original to its 18th-century construction.

== History ==
=== 18th century ===
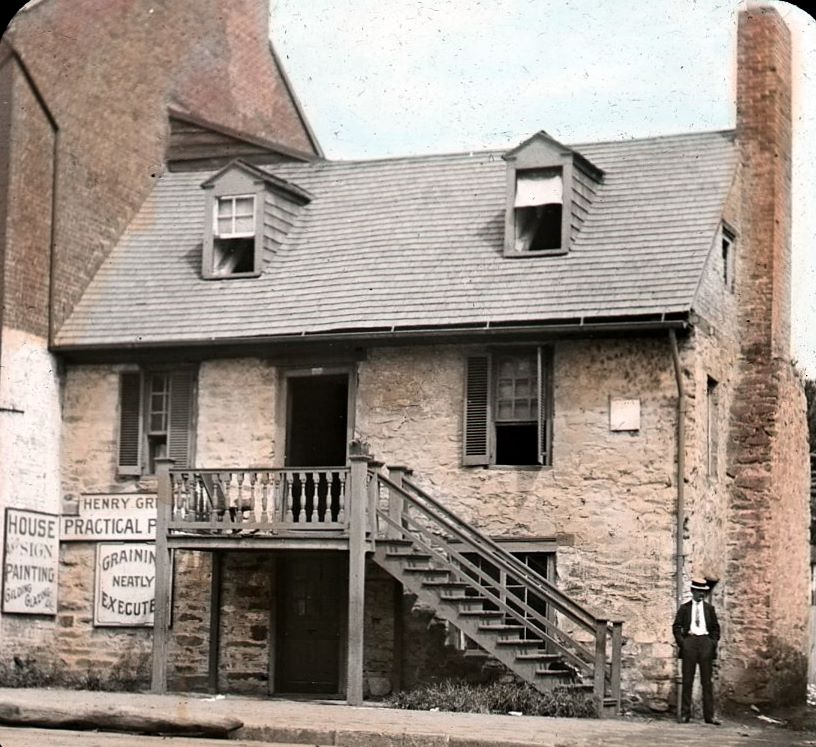
Old Stone House, c. 1890

In 1764, Christopher and Rachel Layman bought Lot Three, a piece of land in Georgetown's commercial district. They paid £1 10s. and financed the construction of a simple one-room house the following year. The lot faced Bridge Street, now known as M Street NW. The Laymans' only possessions listed in the inventory when he died were Christopher's tools, a stove, Bibles, and some furniture. Christopher died unexpectedly in 1765, and the widowed Rachel Layman remarried two years later. She sold the house to another widow, Cassandra Chew.

Chew was a member of the upper-middle class and owned several properties in and around Georgetown. Because of her wealth, Chew was able to finance the construction of a rear kitchen in 1767 and a second-floor addition to the house between 1767 and 1775. The third floor originated in a property line dispute during the 1790s; the original west wall had been constructed six feet (2 m) beyond the property line and had to be dismantled. Chew used the opportunity to add the upper floor, which was completed by 1790.

Following the American Revolutionary War, government officials carved out land from Virginia and Maryland to create as the new nation's capital. Pierre (Peter) Charles L'Enfant, appointed by President George Washington to design the city layout, arrived in Georgetown on March 9, 1791, and began his work. Washington and L'Enfant held their meetings at Suter's Tavern, a former building owned by John Suter near 31st and K Streets, NW. At the time, John Suter Jr. was renting a room at the Old Stone House. For many years, locals believed that Washington and L'Enfant had met at the Old Stone House instead. This folklore is why the house was never demolished, and for many years a sign hung over the front door which said, "George Washington's Headquarters." After some research done by the National Park Service, they learned that the folklore was not true. By the time they had discovered that they already owned the House and the property.

=== 19th century ===
When Chew died in 1807, she bequeathed Old Stone House to one of her daughters, Mary Smith Brumley, who became the first of many owners who operated businesses from the house. Like her mother, Brumley ran a successful merchant's shop inside the home. The house, then known as the Layman home after the first owners, remained in the family until 1875.

=== 20th and 21st centuries ===
Over the years, the house had been used as a shop for hats, tailors, locksmiths, clockmakers, house roofers, and house painters. The Old Stone House was still privately owned in 1953, serving as a used car dealership with the backyard converted to a parking lot when the U.S. federal government purchased the property for $90,000 ($1,083,000 today) and transferred it to the National Park Service for management. Between 1953 and 1960, the National Park Service removed most 19th- and 20th-century intrusions to the home, and the parking lot was redeveloped as an English garden.

After the renovation, the Old Stone House was opened to the public in 1960. It became a part of the George Washington Memorial Parkway. Stewardship of the house was later transferred to the Chesapeake and Ohio Canal National Historical Park. In the late 1980s, stewardship of the Old Stone House was transferred to the Rock Creek Park administration.

== Architecture ==
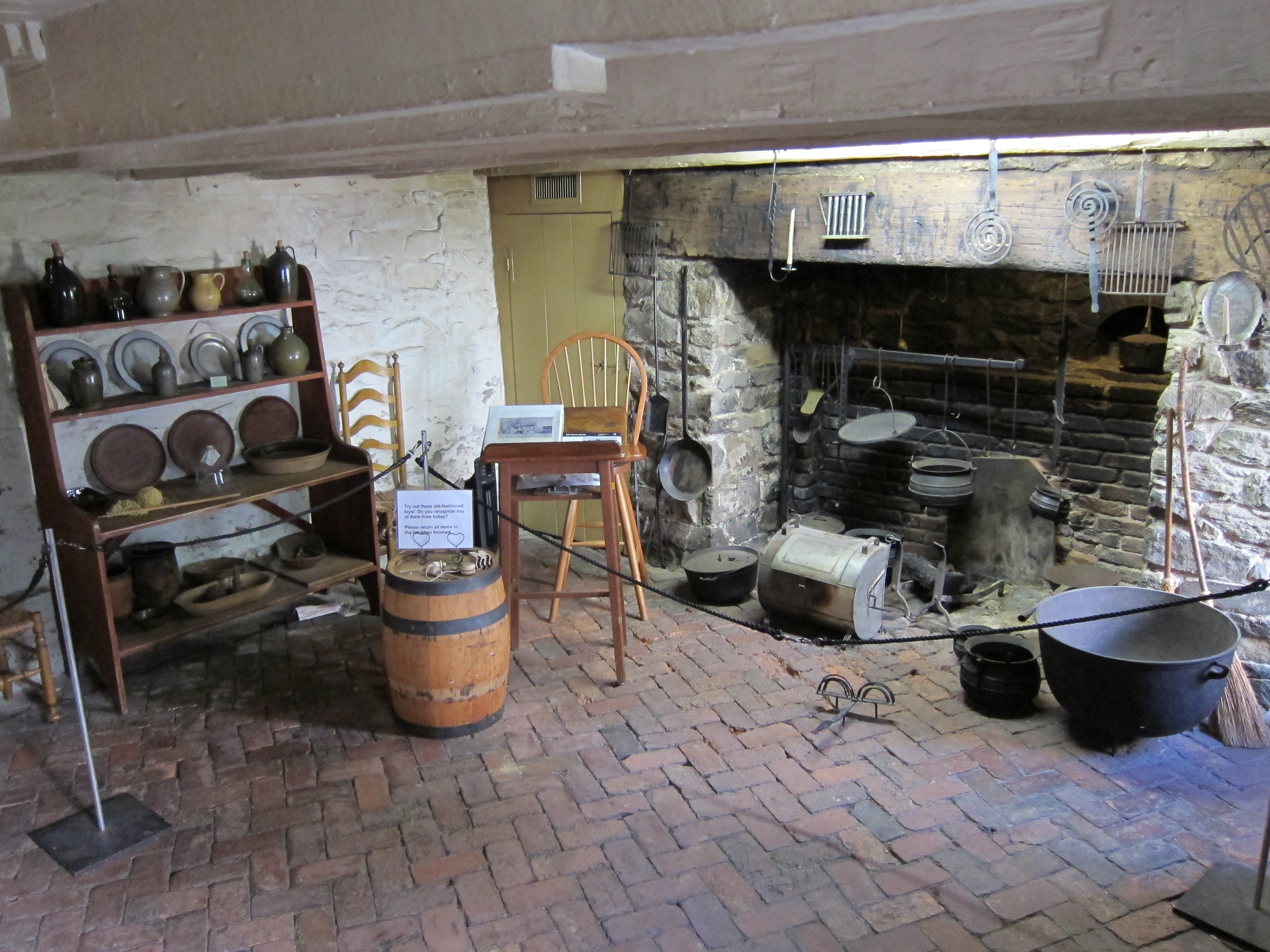
Old Stone House's first floor kitchen

Old Stone House is an example of vernacular architecture. The exterior of the house, constructed of blue granite and fieldstone, was quarried from a location 2 miles (3 km) away near the Potomac River. The walls range from two to three feet (60–90 cm) thick. The oak used in the house was harvested from forests that were once predominant in Georgetown.

On the first floor, the original roof and front door were constructed of solid oak and cut with a pit saw. Marks left by the large saw can be seen on the first floor. The kitchen walls and fireplace contain irregular stones that were stacked and affixed with a mortar consisting of sand, lime, ash, and water. The kitchen's hearth is large enough to heat the entire house.

The second-floor architecture differs significantly from the first floor since Chew could afford higher quality building material. A second doorway and staircase were constructed for family members and guests. The original entrance was then reserved for workers and deliveries. There are three rooms located on this floor, the dining room, a bedroom, and the parlor. The hallway between the dining room and two front rooms features a high ceiling for ventilation in Georgetown's hot summers. The second-floor walls were plastered and painted. Chair rails were added to prevent damage to the walls. In the dining room, a dumbwaiter concealed by recessed pine cabinetry delivered food from the kitchen below. A clock believed to have been made by John Suter Jr., located in the dining room, is the only original piece of furniture left in the house. The clock dates back to the early 19th century. The bedroom features a carved wooden mantle that is believed to be of French origin.

The third floor, constructed of brick, was a private space. It was completed around 1790. It is much plainer than the second floor, with unfinished paneling and unpainted walls. There are three rooms on this floor, believed to be children's bedrooms and a storage area. A closet is attached to the third-floor bedroom, an unusual feature in 18th-century colonial houses. One often-repeated myth about the rarity of closets in British North America was that they were subject to a "closet tax". In reality, there is no evidence of any such tax being levied by the colonial governments. The rarity of closets was largely due to the lower number of clothes owned by most people of the time.

The Colonial Revival garden, located behind the house and bordered by a white picket fence, is 399 feet (122 m) deep and 76 feet (23 m) wide. Roses, perennials, and bulbs are located throughout the garden.

== Current usage ==
Visitors are greeted by staff who tell the history of one of the oldest structures in Washington, D.C. The kitchen, parlor and bedrooms, furnished as they would have been in the late 18th century, are open for viewing. A gift shop operated by Eastern National is located inside the front room of the house. The garden is used for simple wedding ceremonies and as an area for locals and tourists to rest while shopping or a lunch break. The building is open to the public seven days a week, from 11:00 am to 6:00 pm Monday through Thursday and Friday to Sunday 11:00 am to 7:00 pm. The garden is open to the public every day from dawn until dusk.

== See also ==
- History of Washington, D.C.
- List of museums in Washington, D.C.
- List of the oldest buildings in Washington, D.C.
- National Register of Historic Places listings in Washington, D.C.
