= Forrest-Marbury House =

Historic house in Washington, D.C., United States

- U.S. National Register of Historic Places
- D.C. Inventory of Historic Sites
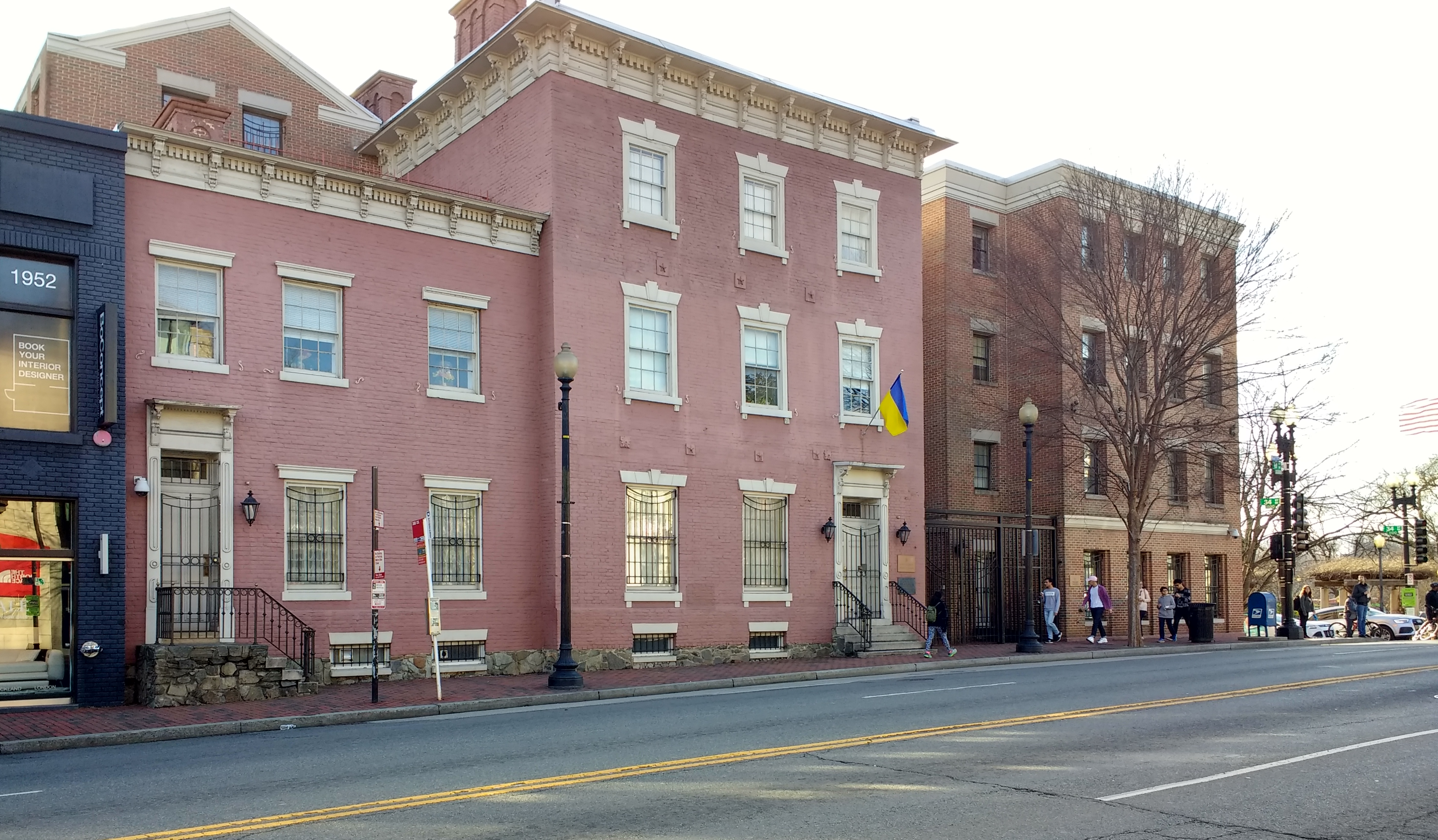
- Forrest-Marbury House, now the Embassy of Ukraine, in Georgetown, Washington, D.C.

- Location within Washington, D.C.
- Location: 3350 M St., NW., Washington, D.C.
- Coordinates: 38°54′17″N 77°4′4″W
- Built: 1788
- Architectural style: Federal
- NRHP reference No.: 73002084

Significant dates
- Added to NRHP: July 02, 1973
- Designated DCIHS: November 8, 1964

The Forrest-Marbury House, located at 3350 M Street NW in Georgetown, Washington, D.C., and is not far from the Francis Scott Key Bridge over the Potomac River.

It was the site of a March 29, 1791, meeting between President George Washington and local landowners to discuss the federal government's purchase offer of land needed to build a new capital city for the young United States of America. The meeting was a success, and the land was soon acquired.

== History ==
The Forrest-Marbury house itself dates to 1788 and is one of the District of Columbia's most historic sites. It was initially home to Uriah Forrest, an early mayor of Georgetown.

The house's next owner was real estate investor William Marbury, who occupied it in 1800 while he purchased large tracts in the District's Anacostia section. Marbury's battle with President Thomas Jefferson over President John Adams's federal appointments resulted in the landmark 1803 U. S. Supreme Court case Marbury v. Madison, written by Chief Justice John Marshall and decided against Marbury, that first established the right of judicial review of executive and legislative branch acts of government.

The house remained in Marbury's family throughout most of the nineteenth century. In 1884 it was occupied by the Edward Corbett family of Ohio. It was later used as a residence and a commercial property first as Jack's (owned by Jack Wilner) in the late 40's, then had a run as The Apple Pie nightclub decades later. Then in the late 1970s became Desperado's, a rock and roll nightclub into the mid-1980s, before being restored and remodeled in the early 1990s. In 1992 it was offered for lease as part of "Forrest Marbury Court". Since 1992, it has served as the chancery of the Embassy of Ukraine.

The house is a townhouse and was built in the federal style.

== Sources ==
- Bergheim, Laura, The Washington Historical Atlas, Woodbine House, Rockville, Maryland, 1992, ISBN 0-933149-42-5, page 161.
- VERIZON, District of Columbia Yellow Pages, June 2007 – 2008, Idearc Media, page 161.
