= Waggaman =

Waggaman may refer to:

People

- Clarke Waggaman (1877–1919), American architect and lawyer
- George A. Waggaman (1782–1843), United States Senator from Louisiana
- Mary T. Waggaman (1846–1931), American writer

Places

- Waggaman, Louisiana

Other

- Waggaman-Ray Commercial Row, listed on the National Register of Historic Places in Washington, D.C.
