= Elizabeth Arden (disambiguation) =

Elizabeth Arden (1884–1966) was a Canadian-American businesswoman.

Elizabeth Arden may also refer to:

- Elizabeth Arden, Inc., cosmetics company founded by Elizabeth Arden
- Elizabeth Arden Building, historic building in downtown Washington, D.C.
- Elizabeth Arden Classic, golf tournament on the LPGA Tour from 1969 to 1986
