= Mount de Sales Academy =

Mount de Sales Academy may refer to:

- Mount de Sales Academy (Georgia), United States
- Mount de Sales Academy (Catonsville, Maryland), United States
