= Harold Rivas Reyes =

Nicaraguan ambassador (born 1960)

- Born: Harold Fernando Rivas Reyes; April 26, 1960 (age 66); Matagalpa, Nicaragua
- Title: Ambassador

Harold Fernando Rivas Reyes (born April 26, 1960) is a Nicaraguan diplomat. He was Ambassador to Costa Rica on behalf of the Sandinista National Liberation Front (FSLN) government from February 2007 until January 2018.

== Biography ==
Harold Fernando Rivas Reyes was born in Matagalpa, Nicaragua on April 26, 1960. As a student, he studied international relations and business. In 1990, he was the first secretary as well as an alternate representative to the Organization of American States (OAS). In 1997, he became Consul General at the Nicaraguan Embassy in the United States, serving under conservative Presidents Violeta Barrios de Chamorro and Arnoldo Alemán. FSLN President Daniel Ortega appointed Rivas ambassador to Costa Rica on February 16, 2007.

Rivas is the brother of Roberto Rivas Reyes, President of the Supreme Electoral Council (CSE) of Nicaragua. Media noted that Harold Rivas was recalled from his post in Costa Rica shortly after Roberto was sanctioned by the United States under the Magnitsky Act. Costa Rican officials had also just opened an investigation into Roberto Rivas. Harold Rivas's wife Jenny Perez, who served as Consul in Costa Rica, was recalled at the same time.
