= Arturo McFields =

Nicaraguan journalist and diplomat

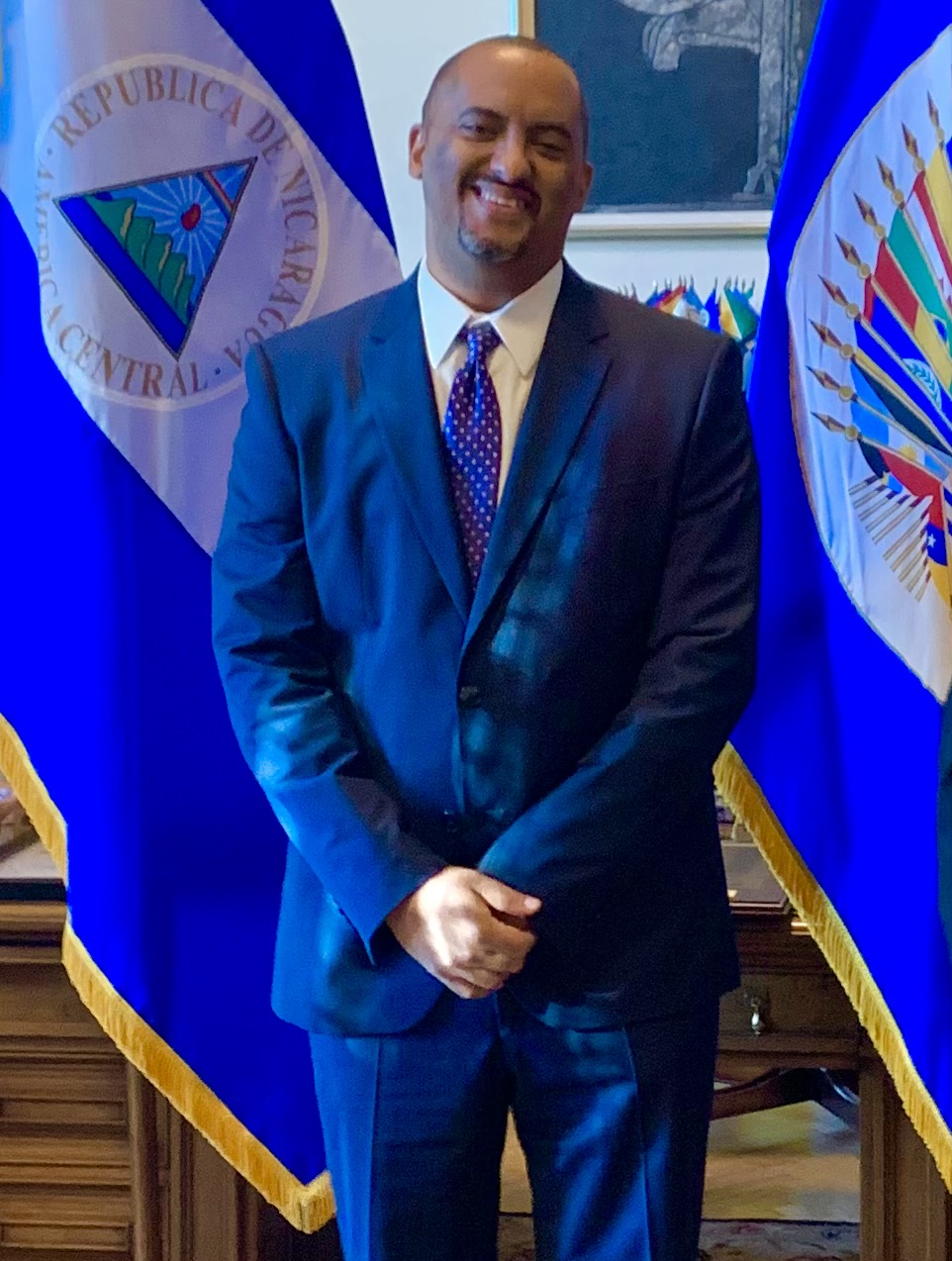

Ambassador of Nicaragua to the Organization of American States
- In office 27 October 2021 – 24 March 2022
- Preceded by: Luis Alvarado
- Succeeded by: Francisco Campbell

Personal details
- Born: 1976 (age 49–50) Nicaragua
- Citizenship: Nicaragua (1976-2023); Spain (2023-present)

Arturo McFields Yescas (born c. 1976) is a Nicaraguan diplomat who was a former ambassador to the Organization of American States and former member of the Norwegian Peace Corps (FK). Former Alumni of the National Defense University's Security Seminar and the Harvard and HarvardX Leadership course.

== Early life and education ==
Mcfields was born in 1976, the son of the Caribbean poet David McFields. After completing journalism studies at the Central American University (1994–1998) and has a master's degree in International Relations from the Seneca Institute of Spain.

He is a former Alumni of the National Defense University's Security Seminar and the Harvard and HarvardX Leadership course.

== Career ==
McFields is an expert on Latin American issues and has shared his analysis on CNN, The Hill, The Washington Post and Infobae. He worked in various media: Channel 12, the newspaper La Prensa and Radio Maranatha. McFields volunteered in the Norwegian Peace Corps (2007), and in 2011 he began his diplomatic career as a press attaché at the Nicaraguan embassy in Washington D.C. (USA). He was First Minister Counselor and then Ambassador to the Organization of American States (2021–2022).

On March 23, 2022, McFields denounced the administration of Daniel Ortega, describing it as a dictatorship that violates human rights and asking for the release of political prisoners in the country. Specifically, he condemned the cruel actions against 179 political prisoners carried out by the dictatorship of Ortega and Rosario Murillo, citing the case of Tamara Dávila, who has not seen her daughter in eight months, as well as the ban on seeing her (something that moved him). He also lamented the death of retired general Hugo Torres. As a result of his comments, McFields was dismissed. He ruled on Nicaragua's early withdrawal from the Organization of American States and blurted out that It should be a "moral victory for the people and especially for the more than 180 political prisoners".

In 2023, McFields was stripped of his Nicaraguan citizenship.

In July 2023 the government of Spain granted him Spanish citizenship.
