= María Haydeé Osuna =

Nicaraguan politician

María Haydée Osuna
- Osuna in February 2020

President of the Constitutional Liberal Party
- Incumbent
- Assumed office 29 April 2012

Third Vice President of the National Assembly of Nicaragua

Member of the National Assembly of Nicaragua
- Constituency: National list

Member of the Central American Parliament
- Incumbent
- Assumed office 2001
- (substitute); 1997–2001

Personal details
- Born: María Haydee Osuna Ruíz Managua, Nicaragua
- Party: PLC
- Occupation: Politician

María Haydée Osuna Ruíz (also spelled María Haydee Osuna) is a Nicaraguan politician who has served as president of the Constitutional Liberal Party (PLC) since 29 April 2012. She is a member of the National Assembly of Nicaragua and has held the position of Third Vice President of the Assembly. She previously served as a deputy in the Central American Parliament (PARLACEN).

Osuna is a long-time figure in Nicaraguan liberal politics and rose through the ranks of the PLC, closely associated for many years with former president Arnoldo Alemán. She has been a controversial figure, particularly since the late 2010s, due to internal party conflicts and her role in actions that critics describe as collaboration with the government of Daniel Ortega.

== Early life and education ==
Osuna was born in the Barrio Altagracia of Managua. She is the oldest of twelve siblings. She completed her early education at the Colegio María Mazzarello and later attended the Colegio Divino Pastor up to the third year of secondary school after winning a scholarship through a youth music contest. She later continued studies while working.

== Career ==
Osuna began her professional career at Inversiones Nicaragüenses de Desarrollo S.A. (Indesa), a company linked to the Alemán family, where she worked alongside Arnoldo Alemán and Jaime Morales Carazo. She later worked at the Chamber of Industries and, after Alemán became mayor of Managua, served as Director of Human Resources in the municipal government starting in January 1991.

In 2000, she was appointed Director General of Customs (Directora General de Aduanas), becoming the first woman to hold the position.

=== Political career ===
Osuna entered politics through the PLC. She served as a substitute deputy in the Central American Parliament from 1997 to 2001 and as a proprietary deputy from 2001. She later became a deputy in the National Assembly of Nicaragua and has held the post of Third Vice President of the Assembly.

On 29 April 2012, she was elected president of the PLC amid internal disputes. She has remained in the position through subsequent internal conflicts, particularly a major dispute in 2019–2020 with the faction loyal to Arnoldo Alemán and his wife María Fernanda Flores, from which she emerged as the recognized legal representative of the party by the Supreme Electoral Council (CSE).

In August 2021, Osuna filed a complaint with the CSE that contributed to the cancellation of the legal personality of the opposition party Citizens for Liberty (CxL), the last major opposition vehicle ahead of the November 2021 general election. This action drew strong criticism from opposition groups and the international community.

In March 2022, the United States Department of State added Osuna to its list of “Corrupt and Undemocratic Actors” (commonly known as the Engel List) for her role in subverting the 2021 elections by signing the complaint that led to the disqualification of CxL.

Osuna and the PLC under her leadership have continued to participate in elections organized by the Ortega government, while facing accusations from critics and some former party members of collaboration with the ruling Sandinista National Liberation Front (FSLN) and of internal authoritarian practices. She has denied forming a pact with the FSLN and has rejected the U.S. sanctions, describing them as interference.

In 2023 some former PLC directors accused her of mismanagement of party funds before the Comptroller General of the Republic.

== Personal life ==
Arnoldo Alemán is the godfather of her first child. Limited public information is available about her private life.
