= Roberto Rivas =

Roberto Rivas may refer to:

- Roberto Rivas (footballer), Salvadoran football player born in 1941 – died in 1972
- Roberto Rivas Reyes, Nicaraguan Supreme Electoral Council President
