= Mariano Fiallos Oyanguren =

Nicaraguan judge and academic (1933–2014)

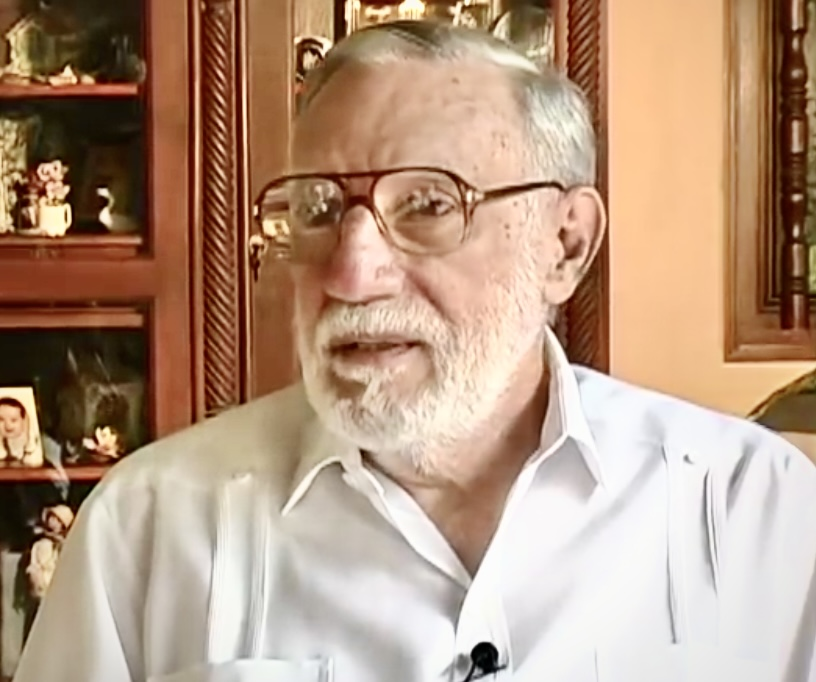
- Fiallos in 2005
- Born: 28 June 1933
- Died: 25 June 2014 (aged 80); León, Nicaragua
- Citizenship: Nicaragua
- Title: President of the Supreme Electoral Council; Rector of National Autonomous University of Nicaragua at León
- Political party: Sandinista National Liberation Front
- Father: Mariano Fiallos Gil
- Relatives: Rosario Fiallos Oyanguren (sister)

Mariano Fiallos Oyanguren (28 June 1933 – 25 June 2014) was a Nicaraguan judge and academic. He was rector of National Autonomous University of Nicaragua at León (UNAN-León) from 1974 to 1980 and President of the Supreme Electoral Council from 1984 to 1996, overseeing the country's first democratic transfer of power in 1990.

== Biography ==
Mariano Fiallos Oyanguren was born on 28 June 1933, in León, Nicaragua. Fiallos's father was Mariano Fiallos Gil and his mother Soledad Oyanguren. He had four siblings, including writer Rosario Aguilar. Fiallos Gil was a longtime university autonomy advocate and National Autonomous University of Nicaragua at León (UNAN-León) rector from 1957 to 1964, winning university autonomy in 1958 under Anastasio Somoza García (and codified in the constitutional reforms of 1966). After the student massacre of 23 June 1959, in which the Somocista Guard killed four students, National Guard troops were not allowed physical access to the campus, including to enroll as students.

Fiallos Oyanguren earned an LL.M. from Southern Methodist University in 1956, a law degree from UNAN in 1957 and a PhD from the University of Kansas in 1968. His dissertation was on "The Nicaraguan Political System."

The university autonomy won by his father later facilitated Sandinista recruitment and organization of their primarily urban political cadre under the rectorships of Carlos Tünnerman (1964 to 1974) and Fiallos Oyanguren who became rector of UNAN-León, from 1974 to 1980. Fiallos Oyanguren was elected rector in a competition with his friend, the philosopher and jurist Alejandro Serrano Caldera. While at UNAN-León, Tünnerman was also a close friend of Fiallos Oyanguren and writer Sergio Ramírez was one of Fiallos's law students in 1959.

He was later appointed to the Higher Commission for University Education.

In 1984 he became President of the Supreme Electoral Council (CSE) for the Nicaraguan elections that year. He was reappointed in February 1985 for a six-year term. Meanwhile, he served as a visiting professor at the University of Kansas in 1985.

A member of the Sandinista National Liberation Front (FSLN), in 1990 he organized the elections for and ultimately oversaw Nicaragua's first peaceful transfer of power, as his party's candidate, incumbent Daniel Ortega, lost to Violeta Barrios de Chamorro. Fiallos played a pivotal role in upholding the integrity of the 1990 election: when he was instructed to announce, at 7PM on election night, 25 February, the results of the first four precincts as victories for the FSLN, he instead chose to read the real results, in which the precincts were split, with two going to the FSLN and two to the ONU candidate Chamorro, who went on to win the election. Antonio Lacayo, a Sandinista supporter who voted for Ortega but ultimately served as a central figure in the Chamorro administration, said later: "Without Mariano Fiallos [Oyanguren] there would have been no democratic transition in 1990."

Fiallos resigned from the CSE in 1996, in response to the 1995 constitutional and electoral reforms, in which the National Assembly had established that members of political parties would make up the departmental and municipal electoral councils and the Voting Receiving Boards. Fiallos said the consequence was that it was no longer possible for the CSE to exercise control.

Fiallos died on 25 June 2014 in León, Nicaragua. He is buried in León.

== See also ==
- Vilma Núñez de Escorcia
