= Lumberto Campbell =

Nicaraguan politician (born 1949)

- Born: February 3, 1949 (age 77); Bluefields, Nicaragua
- Political party: Sandinista National Liberation Front
- Relatives: Francisco Campbell

Lumberto Ignacio Campbell (born February 3, 1949) is a Nicaraguan Sandinista politician. He is president of Nicaragua's Supreme Electoral Council.

== Early life ==
Campbell was born in Bluefields, Nicaragua in 1949. After studying physics and mathematics at the National Autonomous University of Nicaragua, he went on to become the only Creole guerilla commander in the Sandinista National Liberation Front (FSLN), where he was known by the nom de guerre "El Negro."

== Career ==
In the early 1980s, shortly after the Sandanista victory, Campbell served as Vice-Minister of the Nicaraguan Institute for the Atlantic Coast (Spanish: Instituto Nicaraguense de la Costa Atlantica), which coordinated government activity on the Atlantic Coast, especially in the areas of health, education and economic development. He soon replaced guerrilla commander William Ramírez to become Minister. In 1984 he became the Political Secretary and Minister-Delegate of the President for the Caribbean Coast.

In 2014, the National Assembly named him to the Supreme Electoral Council, where he replaced Emmett Lang as vice-president. In 2018, he became interim president of that body, after its former president, Roberto Rivas, was sanctioned by the United States for human rights abuses and corruption. In November 2019, following widespread protests and the ensuing crackdown by the FSLN government, Campbell was also sanctioned by the United States government for alleged human rights abuses, election fraud and corruption. His US assets were frozen, and US citizens were prohibited from doing business with him. The UK also imposed sanctions on him after the 2021 Nicaraguan general election, which they called "rigged."

== Family ==
Campbell's brother, Francisco Campbell, was Nicaragua's Ambassador to the United States from 2010-2024, and his nephew, Michael René Campbell Hooker, has served as Nicaragua's Ambassador to Afghanistan since 2024.
