= Clarke Waggaman =

American lawyer

Daniel Boone Clarke Waggaman (November 16, 1877 - October 3, 1919) was an architect, designer, and lawyer. He designed residences, apartments, commercial buildings, townhouses, and country estates throughout America, most notably the Washington, D.C., districts: Dupont Circle, Sheridan Kalorama, Massachusetts Ave. Heights, West End, and Connecticut Ave.

Waggaman's twelve-year career included a short, two-year partnership with George Nicholas Ray before Waggaman's untimely death. Together, the two redefined several buildings along the corridor of Connecticut Avenue, including Waggaman-Ray Commercial Row. The first project by the two partners was at 1904-1906 R Street NW.

== Early years ==
=== Family ===
Daniel Boone "Clarke" Waggaman was born on November 16, 1877, at his family's home of 1008 13th Street in Washington, D.C.

The Waggamans were a wealthy, established Maryland family. At age seven, the Waggaman family moved to 3300 0 Street in Georgetown. Clarke's father, Thomas E. Waggaman, worked as a real-estate broker and was once considered one of the wealthiest men in DC at the height of his career. He used his growing wealth to invest in art and public projects - most notably having one of the first art collections in the United States to include works of French artists Millet and Corot. Their private gallery was housed in the adjoining building to their home at what-is-now 3304 0 Street. In addition, T.E. Waggaman's real estate investments included several prominent properties in the DC region - including Woodley Park (owner from 1888-1904), Wesley Heights, Morris Addition, and Pennsylvania Avenue Heights. However, in 1904, Thomas E. Waggaman declared bankruptcy and moved from Washington to Annapolis, MD where he died two years later.

Clarke Waggaman's family suffered bankruptcy, leading to the public auction of their art collection; however, only two years later, he received a substantial inheritance from his maternal grandfather and namesake. This inheritance would form the financial backing for Clarke Waggaman's architectural career.

=== Education ===
Until the age of twelve, Waggaman attended Georgetown Preparatory School, which at the time was part of Georgetown College (Georgetown University). Upon his mother's death in 1889, Waggaman moved to Europe and studied under a private, French tutor. Although his European education explored a number of topics, he became particularly fascinated by architecture - especially French and Italian Classicism. His French tutor encouraged Waggaman to continue his architectural pursuits, although it would be several years before Waggaman formally did so.

Waggaman moved back to Washington, D.C., to pursue a law degree on the insistence of his father. In 1901, Waggaman graduated from Catholic University.

=== Marriage ===
In 1898, Clarke Waggaman met his future wife and fellow Washingtonian-native, Grace Knowlton, while studying in Europe. The two courted for two years before returning home to Washington, D.C. They were married at his grandfather's farm, called "Valley View" located on Foxhall Road.

They had a son: Wolcott Clarke Waggaman, who went on to become an architect like his father.

== Career ==
=== Early career ===
After graduating law school, Clarke Waggaman worked as an attorney for his father's business until its bankruptcy in 1905. Only after his father's real-estate business went bankrupt did Waggaman begin to pursue the practice of architecture. In 1906, Waggaman inherited a large sum of money from his maternal grandfather and namesake. This substantial fortune formed the financial stability that allowed Waggaman to establish his own architectural practice. At the age of 28, Waggaman's first architectural project was a personal project in Woodley Park, where he and his family lived until 1917. The property was located 2600 Connecticut Avenue, NW (now demolished).

During Waggaman's early career, the Dupont Circle area was booming as cheap land prices and the widening of Connecticut Avenue encouraged several wealthy Northerners, including senators, to build winter homes. Waggaman's prior experience in his father's real-estate business provided him with a strong network of clientele. His interest in French and Italian Classicism was especially appreciated by these wealthy clients, and he was soon receiving commissions for both townhouses and country estates.

=== Partnership ===
In 1917, Waggaman combined his talents by partnering with George N. Ray, who was formally trained in architecture at the University of Pennsylvania. Like Waggaman, Ray shared an affinity for French classicism, the Ecole des Beaux Arts, and the City Beautiful Movement. Their firm, "Waggaman & Ray," greatly influenced the architectural style of DC's Dupont Circle and Kalorama neighborhoods. Several of their projects involved renovating Victorian buildings with classical, limestone facades and the two are accredited with unifying the architectural style of Connecticut Avenue's commercial buildings.

== Legacy ==
=== Death ===
In 1919, Clarke Waggaman contracted influenza during the global flu pandemic and died shortly after. He was 42 years old.

=== Selected works ===
During the span of his twelve year career as an architect, Waggaman designed an impressive 135 buildings, several of which are currently protected as national historic place or L'Enfant Trust historic properties. Several surviving buildings can be found throughout various neighborhoods of DC, most prominently Dupont Circle. The following buildings in Washington, DC are known projects of Clarke Waggaman or Waggaman & Ray:

==== Washington, DC residences + buildings ====
===== Demolished =====
- 2600 Connecticut Avenue (1905)
- Alterations at 1815 Q Street

===== Surviving =====
*buildings were sourced from the Library of Congress, although dates are sometimes approximate

- 2026 R St, NW (1907 and even renovated by C. Waggaman in 1915) - currently home to Interior Designer, Mary Douglas Drysdale, and her interior design practice.
- 1716 New Hampshire Avenue NW (1910)
- 1530 Connecticut Avenue (1910)
- 2134 Leroy Place, NW (1911)
- 1715 N Street, NW (c. 1911)
- 1738 M Street, NW (c. 1910 – 1916)
- 1752 M Street, NW (c. 1910 – 1916)
- 1754 M Street, NW (c. 1910 – 1916)
- 1756 M Street, NW (c. 1910 – 1916)
- 724 18th Street
- 263 N Street, NW
- 2208 Massachusetts Avenue
- 1711 New Hampshire Avenue (1911)
- 1818 R Street, NW
- 1820 R Street, NW (1911)
- 1824 R Street, NW (1911)
- 1825 R Street, NW (1911-1912)
- 1826 R Street, NW (1911)
- Five Row Houses for Harry Kite, 19th Street and R Street, NW (1915) - including 1719 19th Street, NW
- 2300 Wyoming Avenue (formerly U Street), NW (1912)
- 2122 Leroy Place, NW (1912)
- 2124 Leroy Place, NW (1912)
- Row House at 17th Street and New Hampshire Avenue (1912)
- 1734 New Hampshire Avenue (1912)
- 1735 New Hampshire Avenue (1912)
- 1736 New Hampshire Avenue (1912)
- 1710 H Street, NW
- 1827 19th Street, NW (1913)
- 1147 Connecticut Avenue, NW (1913)
- 2340-2342 Massachusetts Avenue, NW (1913)
- 1715 18th Street, NW (1913)
- 1627 New Hampshire Avenue (c. 1913 – 1914) - currently home to the Embassy of Nicaragua
- 1600 New Hampshire Avenue, NW (1913-1914) - currently home to the Embassy of Argentina
- 1905 Kalorama Road, NW (1914)
- Residence at Biltmore Street and Clifbourne Street/Place (1914)
- McCreary Stores at 14th Street and K Street (1914)
- 1638 Connecticut Avenue, NW (1914)
- Dunn Residence on Massachusetts Avenue (1914)
- 2114 Leroy Place, NW (1914–1915)
- St. Thomas Church, 1324 New Hampshire Avenue (1914-1918)
- Office Building for William Hitz at Connecticut Avenue and L Street, NW (1914)
- Two Residences at 19 Street and R Street (c. 1915 – 1917)
- Housing Development at 20th Street and Belmont Street, NW (1915)
- 2019 R Street NW (1915)
- Storefront between 13th Street and 14 Street (1915)
- 1744 R St, NW (1915)
- 2000 G Street, NW (1915)
- Wilkins Building, 1512 H Street, NW (1915)
- Store Building on H Street, NW (between 13th and 14th Street) (1915)
- 1523 New Hampshire Avenue (1915)
- 2025 Hillyer Place, NW (1916)
- 1919 19th Street, NW (1916)
- 1207 Connecticut Avenue (1916)
- 1209 Connecticut Avenue (1916)
- 1211 Connecticut Avenue (1916)
- 1213 Connecticut Avenue (1916)
- 1217 Connecticut Avenue, NW (1916)

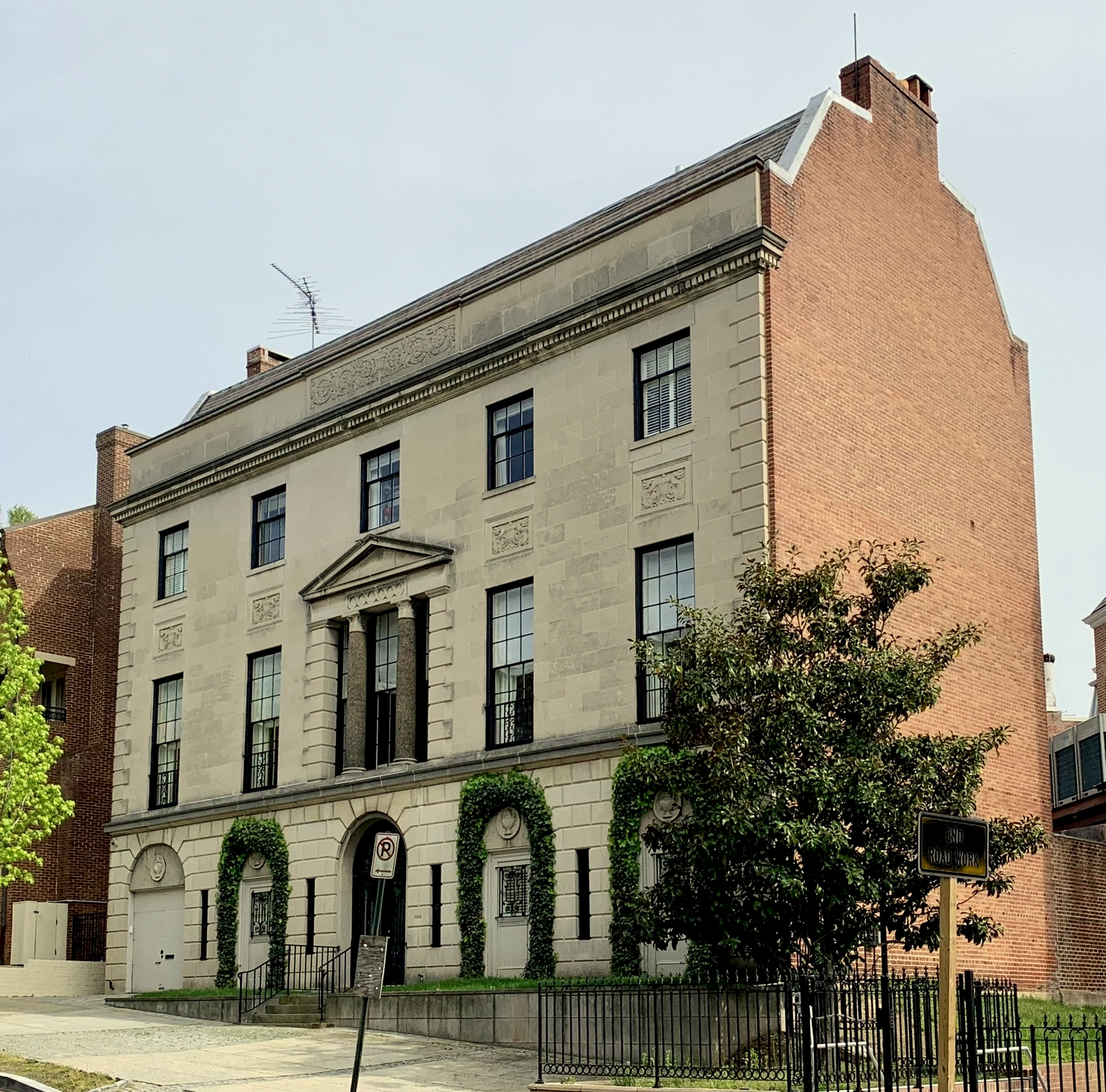
Waggaman designed this house for himself in 1918.

- 1533 New Hampshire Avenue (1916)
- 2126 Bancroft Place, NW (1916)
- 1612 21st Street (1917)
- 1614 21st Street (1917)
- 1904-1906 R Street NW (1917)
- 2929 Massachusetts Avenue, NW (1917)
- 1141-1143 Connecticut Avenue, NW (1917)
- 1512-1520 Connecticut Avenue, NW (1917)
- 1617 Massachusetts Avenue (1917)
- 1302 18th Street, NW (1917)
- Residence at Massachusetts Avenue and 30th Street, NW (1917-1918)
- Williams Residence at Massachusetts Avenue and 30th Street, NW (c. 1917 – 1918)
- 2346 S St. NW (1918)

==== Other buildings ====
- Toledo Club Building, 14th Street and Madison Street, Toledo, Ohio (1912-1913)
- Noyes Estate, Sligo (now Silver Spring), Maryland
- Alterations to the Montgomery Country Club, Montgomery, Maryland
- Summer Camp + Village Hall at Bradley Boulevard, Offutt Road, and Rockvillle Great Falls Road, Bradley Hills (now Bethesda), Maryland
- William T. Davis Residence at Rideway Avenue and Thornapple Road, Chevy Chase, Maryland
- AH Davis Residence, Watch Hill, Rhode Island (1915)
- Johnson Residence, Watch Hill, Rhode Island (1915-1916)
- McKenney Residence, Kensington, Maryland (1914)
