= Embassy of Nicaragua, Washington, D.C. =

Nicaraguan embassy in the United States

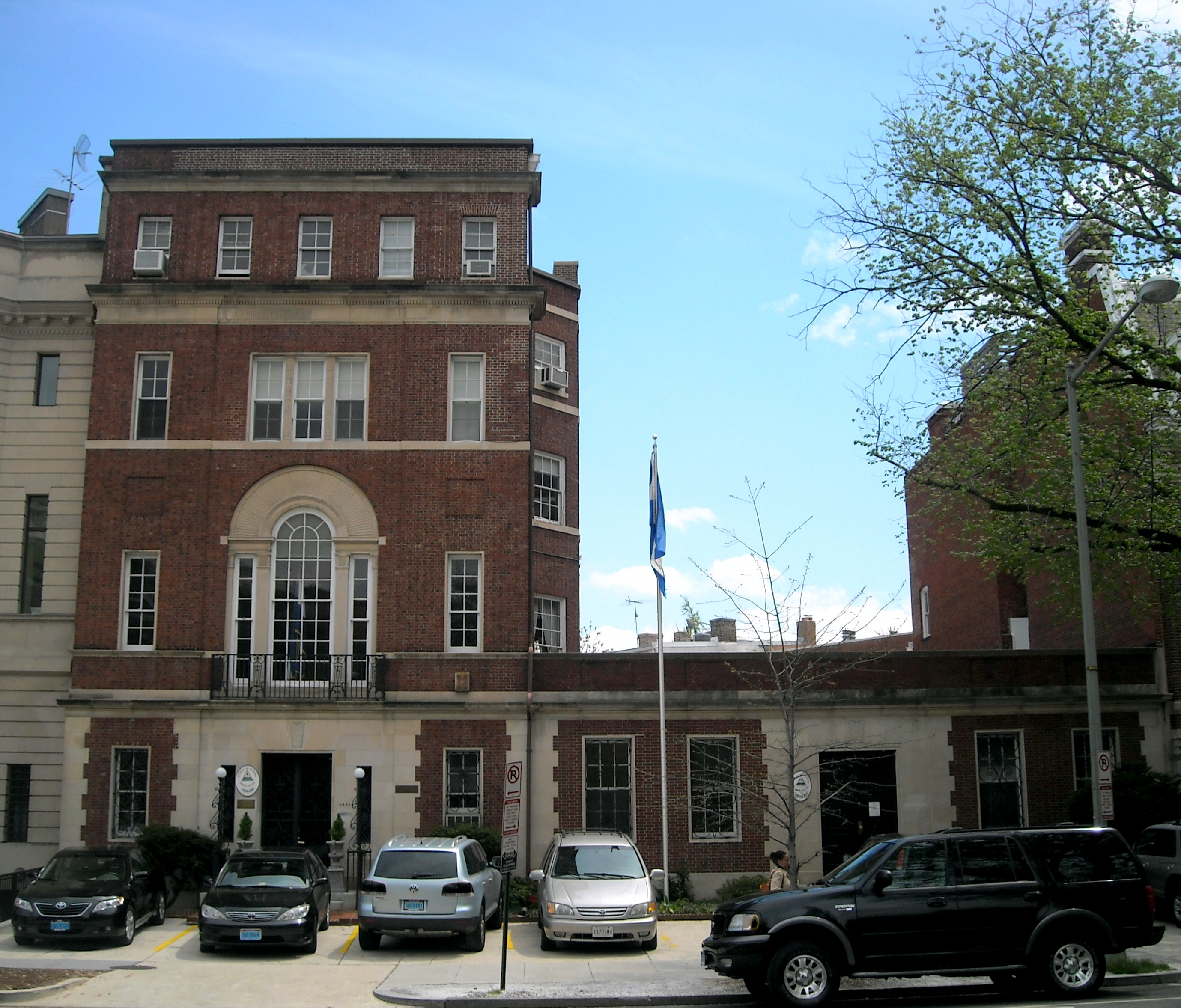
- Location: Washington, D.C.
- Address: 1627 New Hampshire Avenue, N.W.
- Coordinates: 38°54′45.27″N 77°2′26.63″W
- Ambassador: Francisco Obadiah Campbell Hooker

The Embassy of Nicaragua in Washington, D.C. is the Republic of Nicaragua's diplomatic mission to the United States. It is located at 1627 New Hampshire Avenue, Northwest, Washington, D.C., in the Dupont Circle neighborhood. The embassy also operates Consulates-General in Los Angeles, San Francisco, Houston, New Orleans, Miami, and New York City.

Charge D'Affairs is Mauricio Lautaro Sandino Montes.

== Building ==
Dr. Louis C. Lehr (brother of Henry Symes Lehr) and his wife, Marie, were the original occupants of the building. It was designed and built by Clarke Waggaman in 1913–1914. Notable occupants of the building have included Norman H. Davis (while serving as Undersecretary of State), Raymond T. Baker (while serving as Director of the U.S. Mint), Joseph H. Himes (while serving in Congress), Roy D. Chapin (while serving as Secretary of Commerce), and Guillermo Sevilla-Sacasa (while serving as Nicaraguan ambassador).

== Services ==
The embassy operates several services and offices, responsible for different areas of policy and liaising with the relevant American bodies, the most notable of whom are listed below.

=== Chancery ===
The Chancery is the main diplomatic and political body. It is responsible for coordination with the American government on matters, particularly foreign policy, that affect Nicaragua, however, the majority of the diplomacy is conducted by the ambassador, leaving the chancery to liaise with the Nicaraguan government and coordinate with the Press Service in matters of public policy. The diplomats of the chancery take responsibility for a specific policy area and may stand in for the ambassador in his absence. The Chancery has attaches based in each of the five regional consulates.

=== Press and Communications Office ===
The Press Service is responsible for events, as well as coordinating press releases and conferences, including the provision of designated spokesmen. The office also monitors American press coverage of issues pertaining to Nicaragua and reports back to the ambassador and to Managua.

=== The Cultural Service ===
The Cultural Services of the embassy is located at the embassy. Its responsibility is in facilitating "cultural exchange" between the two nations, a role that can be creative, informative or merely administrative. The duties of the service include promoting Nicaraguan creative works in cultural and academic institutions across Nicaragua, with the help of the attaches in regional consulates.

== Consulates ==
Apart from the embassy in Washington, Nicaragua's diplomatic operations in the United States include:

- a consulate general in Miami
- a consulate general in New York City

== Previous Ambassadors ==
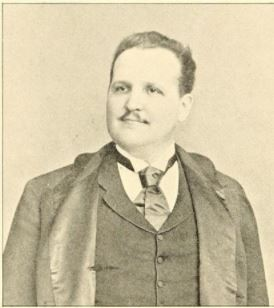
Horacio Guzman

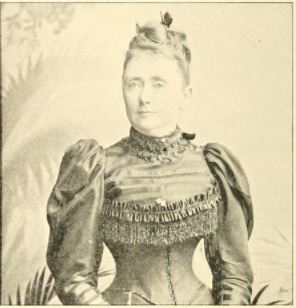
May Ewing, Mrs Horacio Guzman

- 1895 Horacio Guzman
- 1898-1909 Luis Felipe Corea
- 1908-1909 Pedro González
- 1909-1909 Rodolfo Espinosa Ramírez
- 1909-1911 Chargé d'affaires Felipe Rodríguez
- 1911-1913 Chargé d'affaires Salvador Castrillo
- 1913-1917 Emiliano Chamorro Vargas
- 1917-1921 Chargé d'affaires Ramon Enriquez
- 1921-1923 Emiliano Chamorro Vargas
- 1923-1921 Chargé d'affaires
- 1929-1933 Chargé d'affaires Evaristo Carazo
- 1933-1933 Chargé d'affaires Luis Debayle
- 1933-1936 Henri Debayle
- 1937-1943 León Debayle
- 1943-1979 Guillermo Sevilla-Sacasa (Dean of the Diplomatic Corps in Washington D.C from January 1958 to July 16, 1979)
- 1979-1979 Acting Chargé d'affaires Adeline Gröns-Schindler de Argüello-Olivas
- 1979-1980 Interim Chargé d'affaires Adeline Gröns-Schindler de Argüello-Olivas and Francisco d'Escoto Brockmann
- 1980-1981 Chargé d'affaires Francisco d'Escoto Brockmann
- 1981-1982 Arturo J. Cruz
- 1982-1983 Francisco Fiallos-Navarro
- 1983-1983 Chargé d'affaires Manuel Cordero
- 1983-1984 Jose Jarquin-Lopez
- 1984-1988 Carlos Tunnermann Bernheim
- 1988-1990 No ambassador diplomatic relations severed
- 1990-1993 Ernesto Palazio
- 1993-1996 Roberto Mayorga-Cortes
- 1997-2000 Francisco Aguirre-Sacasa
- 2000-2002 Alfonso Ortega Urbina
- 2002-2003 Carlos Ulvert-Sanchez
- 2003-2007 Salvador Stadthagen-Icaza
- 2007-2009 Arturo Cruz Sequeira
- 2010–present Francisco Campbell-Hooker

Chief of Protocol, Nicaragua
