= M Street (Washington, D.C.) =

Four streets of the same name in Washington, D.C.

Coordinates: 38.9056494°N 77.0414223°W

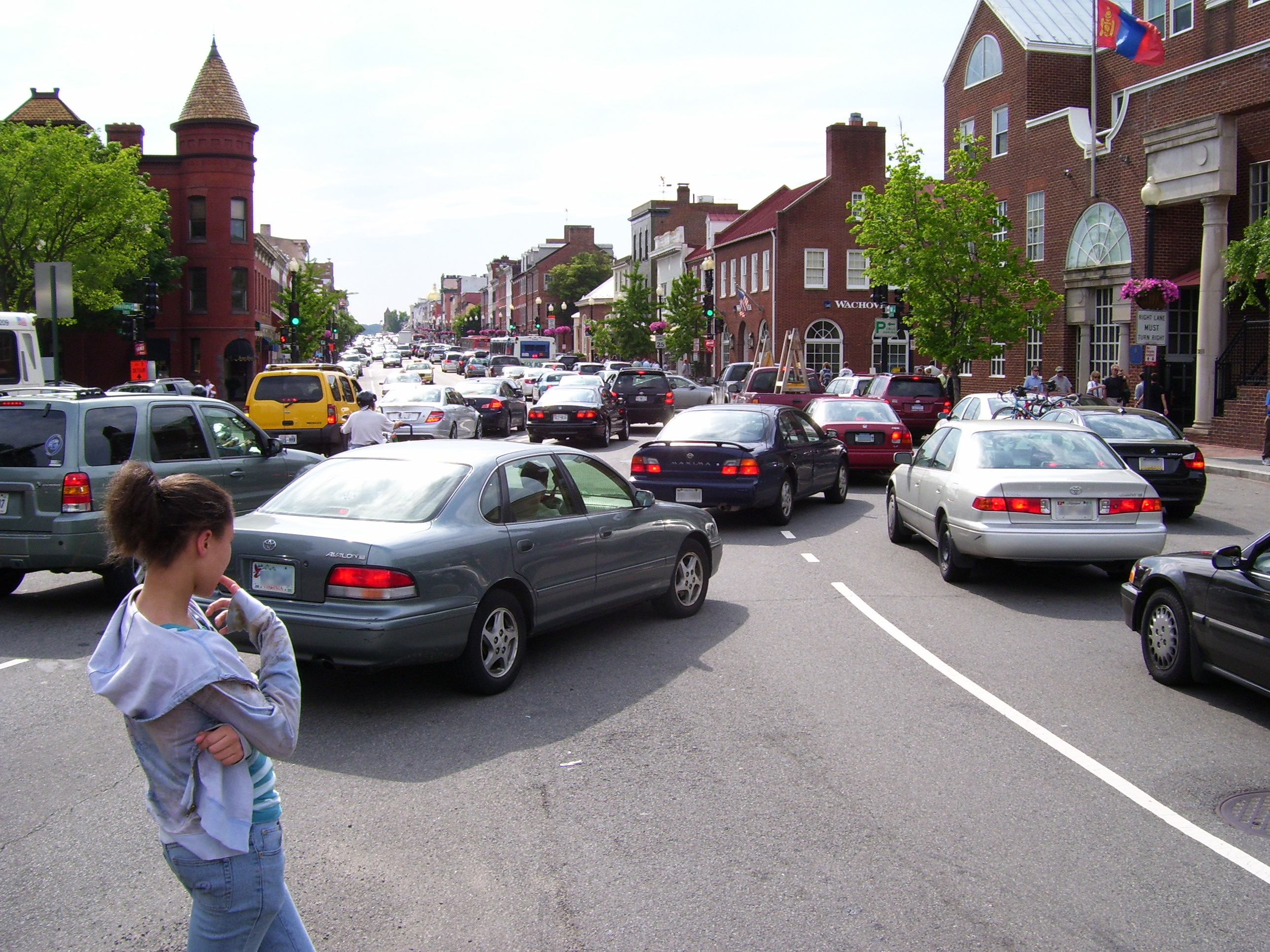
Congestion along M Street in 2008

The name "M Street" refers to two major roads in the United States capital of Washington, D.C. Because of the Cartesian coordinate system used to name streets in Washington, the name "M Street" can be used to refer to any east–west street located twelve blocks north or south of the dome of the United States Capitol (not thirteen blocks, as there is no J Street). Thus, in all four quadrants of the city there are streets called "M Street", which are disambiguated by quadrant designations, namely, M Street NW, NE, SW, and SE.

== M Street NW ==
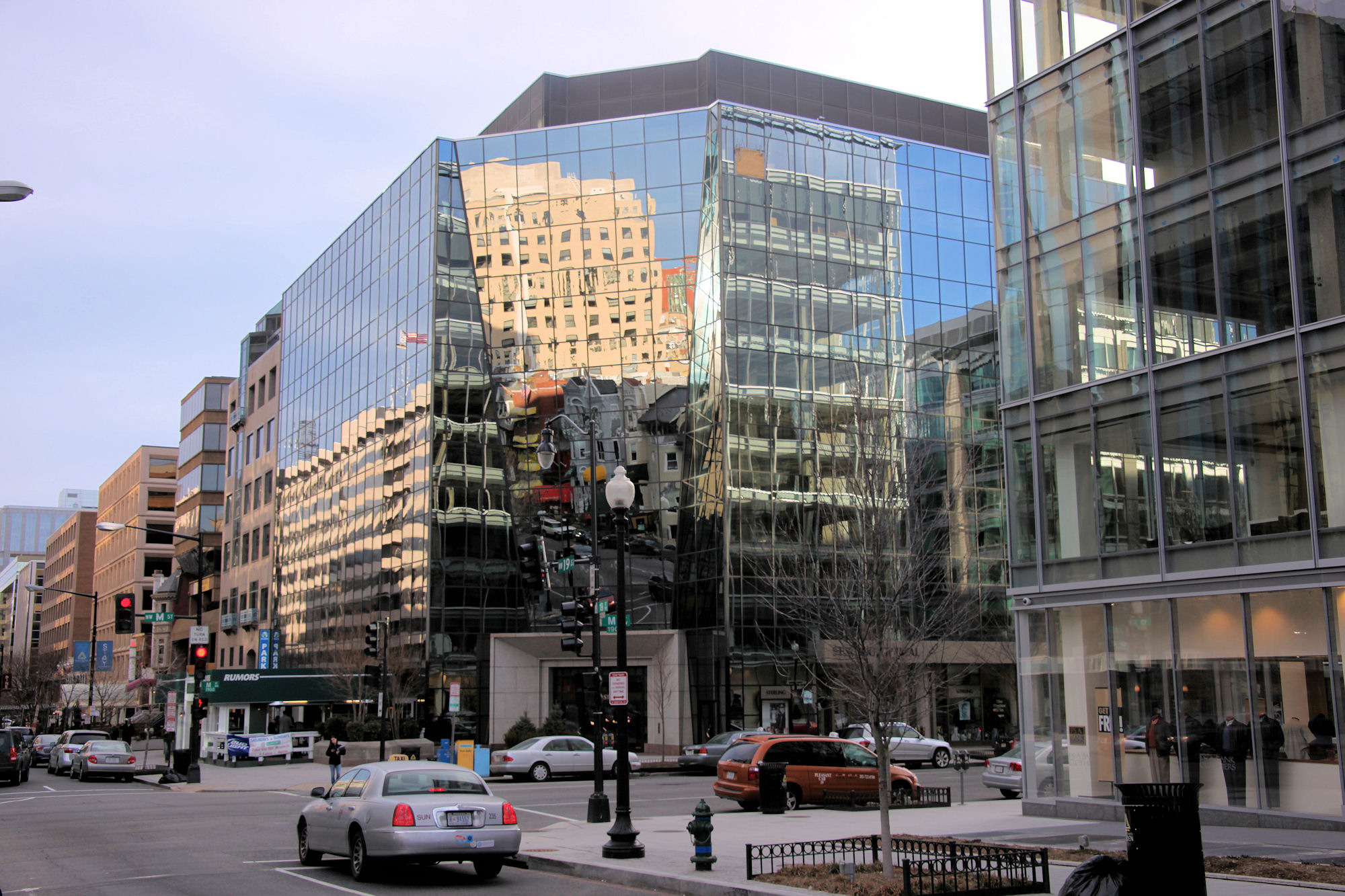
The 1900 block of M Street NW

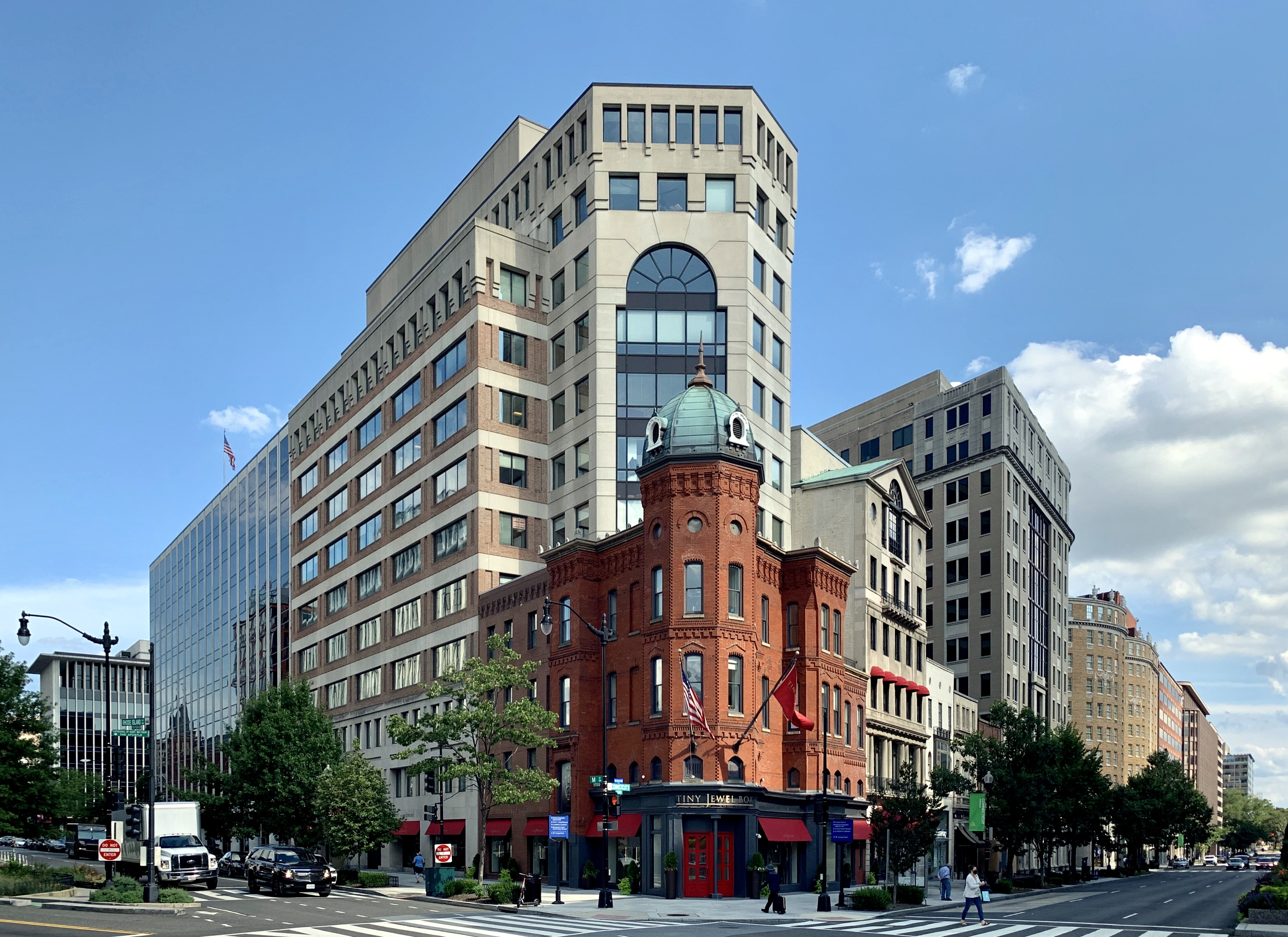
The Demonet Building at the intersection of Connecticut Avenue (right) and M Street NW (left)

In Northwest Washington, M Street is a major street downtown and the main east–west street in the Georgetown neighborhood.

M Street NW begins at the Key Bridge, which crosses the Potomac River at the 3500 block. To the west of 36th Street, M Street turns into Canal Road. M Street was originally called Bridge Street until the roads in Georgetown were renamed in 1895 to conform to the street names used in Pierre Charles L'Enfant's original plan for the federal city. Where 32nd Street would otherwise be, M Street intersects with Wisconsin Avenue. At 29th Street, it meets the western terminus of Pennsylvania Avenue. This is the last major intersection before the M Street Bridge over Rock Creek, which forms the eastern border of Georgetown. The section in Georgetown carries heavy commuter traffic because it connects Pennsylvania Avenue with the Key Bridge and Canal Road.

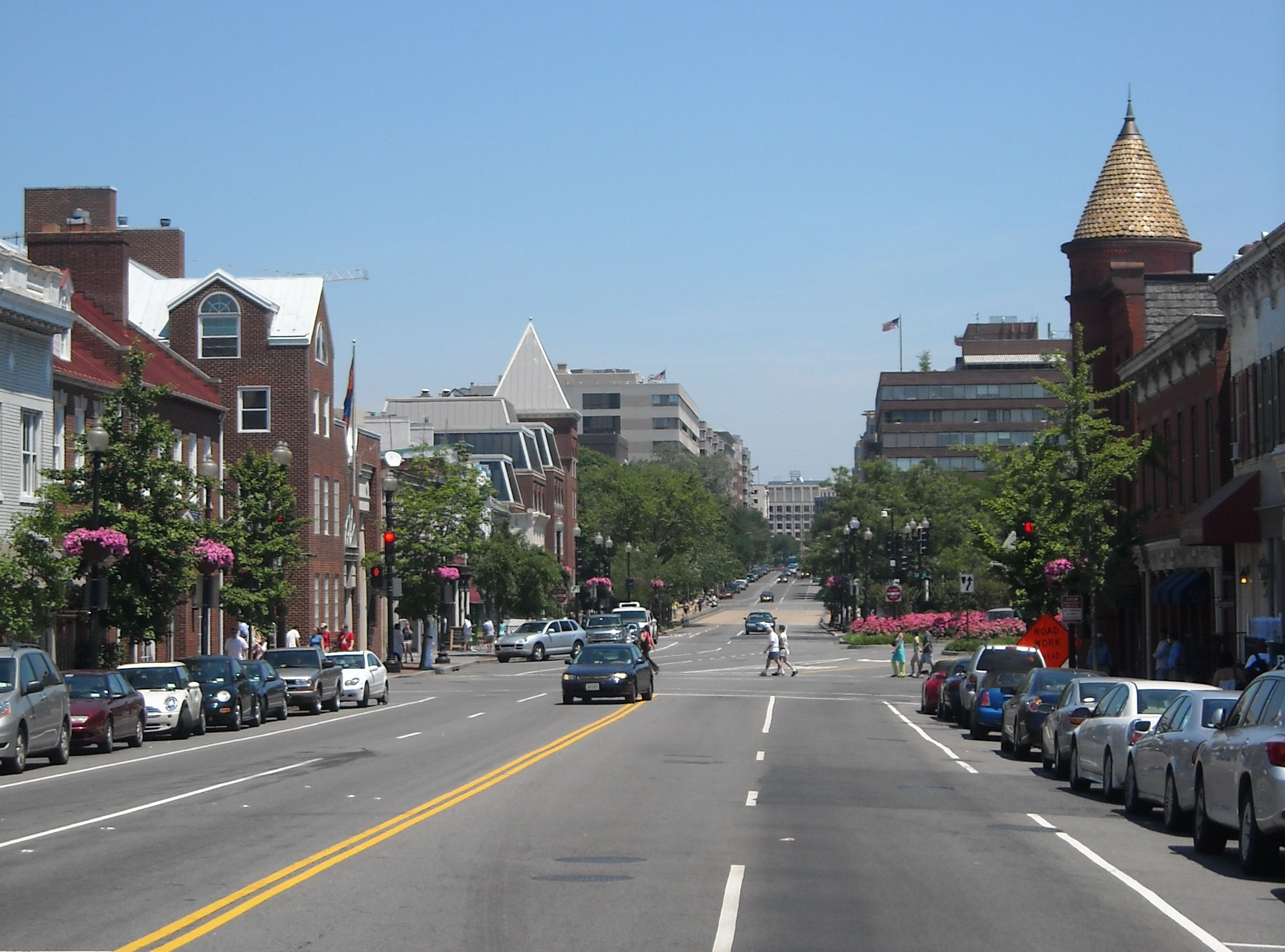
Looking east on M Street NW in Georgetown

From Pennsylvania Avenue to Thomas Circle at 14th Street, M Street is designated for one-way traffic with vehicles driving westbound-only. M Street once again becomes two-way in Georgetown. This stretch is highly developed, consisting mainly of apartments from 26th to 21st and businesses from 21st to Thomas Circle.

From 14th Street to 5th Street NW, M Street is again two-way. Although, halfway through the 900 block, the street turns eastbound. Between 9th and 7th Streets NW, it passes underneath the Walter E. Washington Convention Center. From 5th Street to North Capitol Street, it assumes a complex traffic pattern because of the intersections and near-intersections of several high-traffic streets: M, New York Avenue/U.S. Route 50, the northern terminus of Interstate 395, New Jersey Avenue, and North Capitol Street. Traffic is west-to-east from 5th to 4th, east-to-west from New York to 4th, and west-to-east from New York through North Capitol and onto M Street NE.

== M Street NE ==
M Street NE runs west-to-east from North Capitol Street to Florida Avenue between 6th and 7th, where it terminates at the gates of Gallaudet University. Along the way, it uses an overpass to avoid the Union Station rail yard.

Because the intervening Trinidad neighborhood does not follow the grid pattern, M Street does not emerge again until Bladensburg Road (between 16th and 17th). This two-way stretch dead-ends after intersecting with Maryland Avenue (where 26th Street would be), because the remaining land between that intersection and the Anacostia River is occupied by the United States National Arboretum and Langston Golf Course. The portion of Washington across the Anacostia follows its own variant of the grid pattern, so while there is no M Street NE, the Deanwood neighborhood of Anacostia does have a Meade Street NE in the location where M Street would have re-emerged.

== M Street SW/SE ==
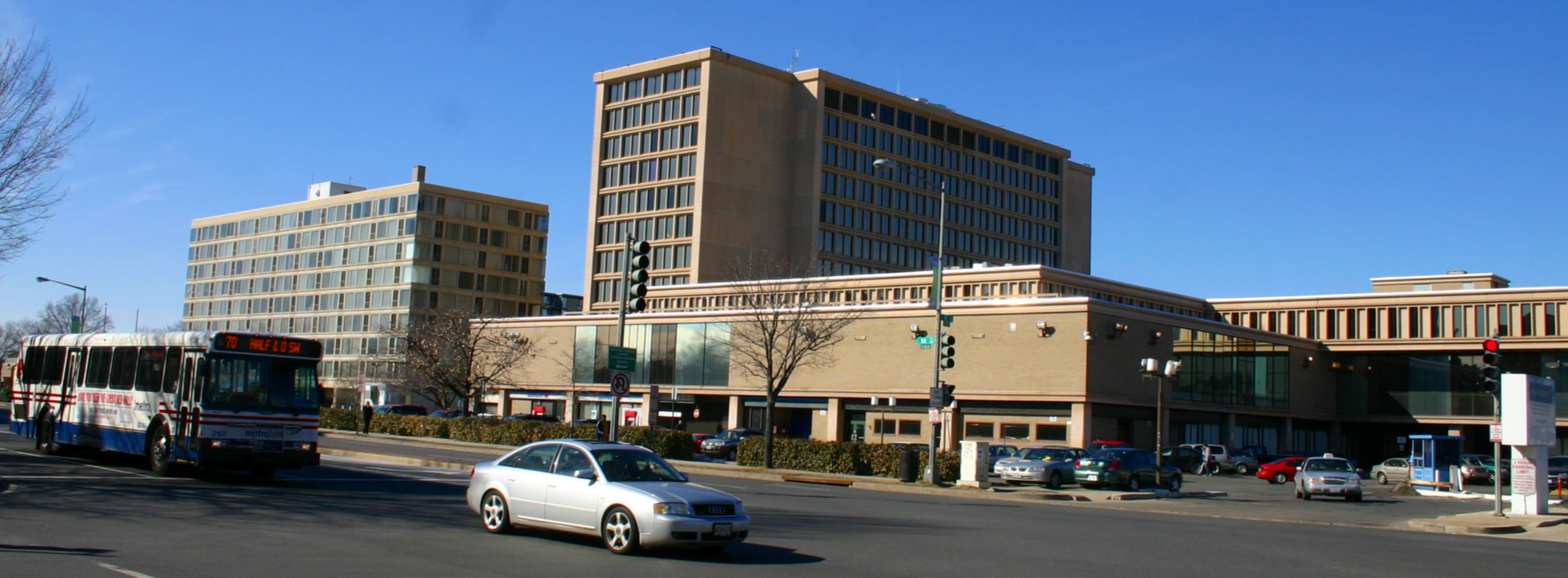
M Street SW in the Southwest Waterfront neighborhood

About a mile south of the U.S. Capitol, M Street is a major east–west traffic thoroughfare connecting Maine Avenue with Interstate 295. The Potomac River prevents M Street from extending farther west than 6th Street/Maine Avenue. Likewise, the Anacostia River limits M Street SE east of 11th to being a named on-ramp for I-295 (the 11th Street Bridges to the immediate south and the Southeast Freeway to the immediate north), Water Street SE (home of several boating clubs), and Pennsylvania Avenue SE at the John Philip Sousa Bridge before terminating.

The most prominent intersection on M Street between those points is with South Capitol Street. M Street runs along the northern edge of the Washington Navy Yard (between 1st and 11th) and near Nationals Park, between 1st and South Capitol.

Another segment of M Street SE continues east of the Anacostia River. Beginning at the Anacostia Freeway (DC-295, roughly where 29th Street would be), it runs diagonally southeast for two blocks, merges with Anacostia Road for one block, then straightens out for two blocks before terminating at 34th Street SE. Its route is blocked by Massachusetts Avenue SE and Fort Dupont Park.
