= Francisco Campbell =

Nicaraguan diplomat

Francisco Obadiah Campbell Hooker is the Nicaraguan Ambassador to the United States. He assumed the post in 2010; prior to that he served as deputy to the Central American Parliament. In March 2022, Campbell was also appointed Nicaraguan ambassador to the Organization of American States; he replaced ambassador Arturo McFields after McFields denounced the administration of President Daniel Ortega as a "dictatorship" following the widespread arrests and prosecution of aspiring 2021 presidential candidates and other opposition figures.

Campbell is married to Miriam Hooker, who serves as Consul at the Nicaraguan embassy in the US. Two of their children, Mabel Leilani Campbell Hooker and Michael Campbell Hooker, have posts representing Nicaragua abroad; Mabel is Press and Cultural Attaché to the embassy in the US.

Campbell’s brother is Lumberto Campbell, Vice-President of Nicaragua's Supreme Electoral Council. Since 2022 Michael Campbell Hooker is a minister for international relations in the FSLN government.
