= Georgetown street renaming =

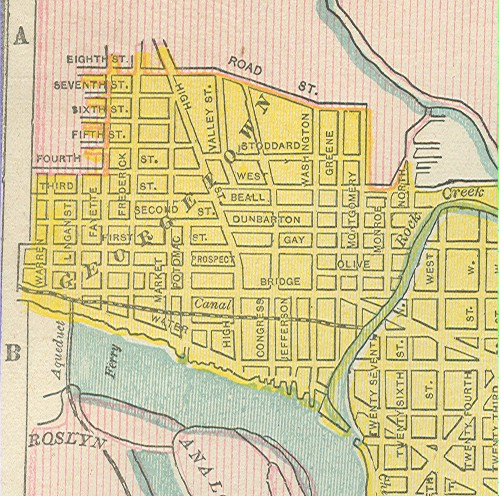
Map of Georgetown in 1899, showing its old street names

The Georgetown street renaming occurred as a result of an 1895 act of the United States Congress that ended even the nominal independence of Georgetown from Washington, D.C. The Act required, among other things, that the street names in Georgetown be changed to conform to the street-naming system in use in the Northwest quadrant of Washington, D.C. However, the old street names were shown on maps as late as 1899.

The lists below set forth the old and new names of Georgetown's streets. Because most east–west streets are not continuous across Wisconsin Avenue, separate lists are provided for those east–west streets that are north of M Street and either east or west of Wisconsin Avenue.

== North–south streets, east to west ==
Old name	New name
North Street	26th Street
Monroe Street	27th Street
Montgomery Street	28th Street
Greene Street	29th Street
Washington Street	30th Street
Jefferson Street	Thomas Jefferson Street
Congress Street	31st Street
Valley Street	32nd Street
High Street	Wisconsin Avenue
Potomac Street	not renamed
Market Street	33rd Street
Frederick Street	34th Street
Fayette Street	35th Street
Lingan Street	36th Street
Warren Street	37th Street

== East–west streets, south to north ==
=== M Street and south ===
Old name	New name
Water Street	K Street. West of 33rd Street NW, the United States Postal Service still recognizes both "K Street" and "Water Street" in addresses.
Grace Street	not renamed
Bridge Street	M Street
Falls Street	M Street

=== North of M Street ===
Old name, east of Wisconsin Avenue	Old name, west of Wisconsin Avenue	New name
Olive Street	Prospect Street	not renamed
Gay Street	First Street	N Street
Dunbarton Street	—	spelling changed slightly to Dumbarton Street
Beall Street	Second Street	O Street
West Street	Third Street	P Street
—	Fourth Street	Volta Place
Stoddert (or Stoddard) Street	Fifth Street	Q Street
—	Sixth Street	Dent Place
—	Seventh Street	Reservoir Road
Road Street	Eighth Street	R Street
