= Demonet Building =

Buildings in Washington, D.C., US

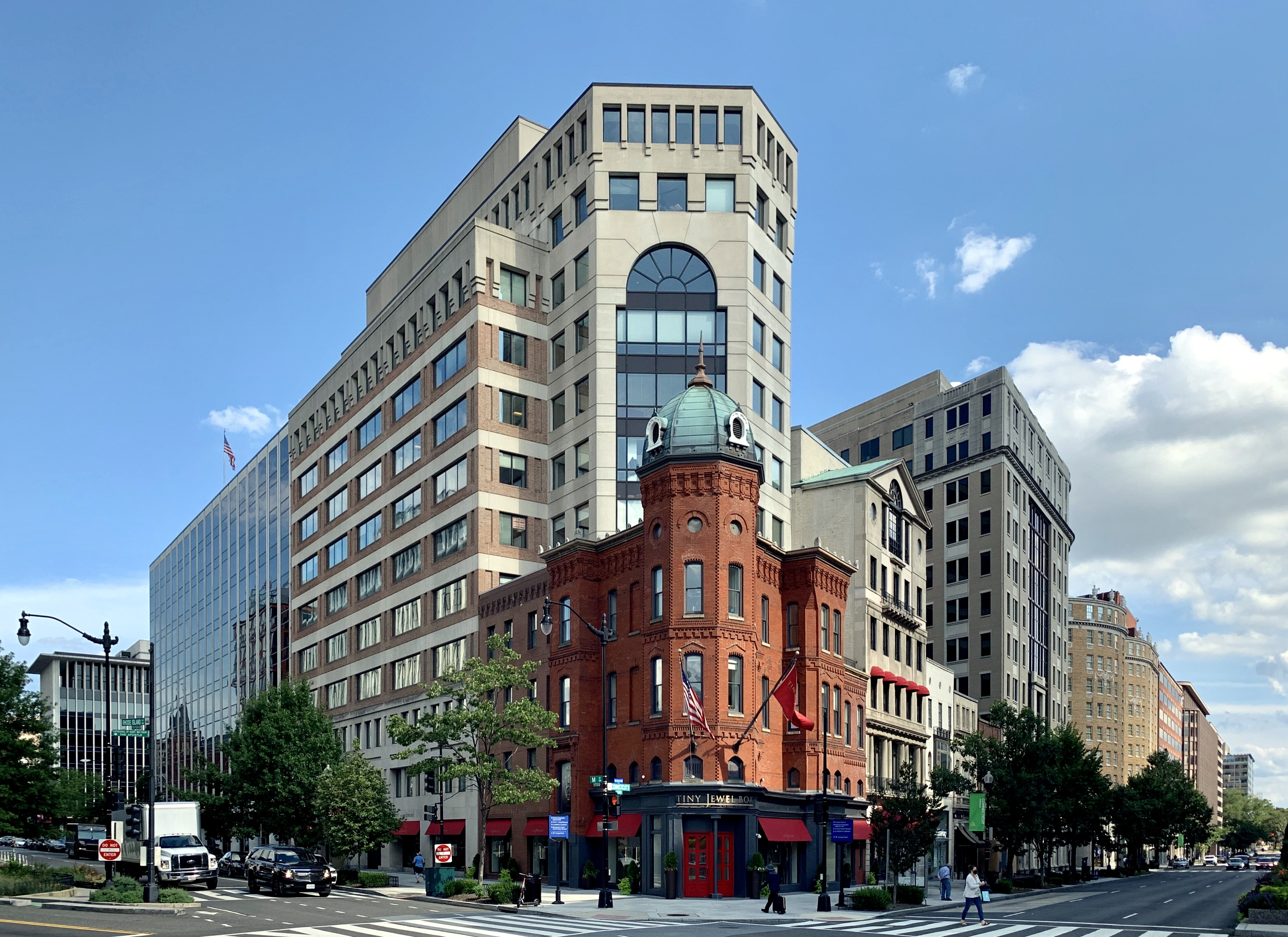
- Demonet Building in 2020
- Interactive map of the Demonet Building area

General information
- Architectural style: Victorian (original building); Postmodern (addition)
- Location: 1155 Connecticut Avenue, N.W., Washington, D.C., U.S.
- Coordinates: 38.9054212°N 77.0411755°W
- Completed: 1880 (original building); 1984 (addition)

Design and construction
- Architects: Unknown (original building); Skidmore, Owings & Merrill (addition)
- Designations

D.C. Inventory of Historic Sites
- Designated: November 23, 1979

The Demonet Building is composed of a historic townhouse and adjoining office building on the southeast corner of Connecticut Avenue and M Street N.W. in Washington, D.C. Constructed in 1880, the townhouse is the last Victorian residence on Connecticut Avenue between Dupont Circle and Farragut Square that has not been significantly altered. It features an octagonal tower topped by a dome with cartouche windows. Following a multi-year legal battle to demolish the townhouse, which had been added to the District of Columbia Inventory of Historic Sites in 1979, the Demonet Building and adjoining lot were sold for what was then a record price for downtown real estate. The adjoining office building, designed by Skidmore, Owings & Merrill, was completed in 1984.

The building's namesake, John Charles Demonet, established a confectionery business on Pennsylvania Avenue in 1848. During the next several decades, he and his family grew the business into a successful company that included catering services. It was a confectionery supplier for the White House. In the early 1900s, the business was moved to Connecticut Avenue, a fashionable residential area at the time. It became a commercial pioneer of what was nicknamed the Fifth Avenue of Washington, D.C. After the business was moved a few blocks north in 1927, the Demonet family continued to own the building. It was rented to various retailers. The family sold the building in 1979. Since the modern addition was constructed, several organizations have owned the property, the most recent being an affiliate of the Qatari royal family.

== Construction and first owner ==
During the 1870s Connecticut Avenue between Dupont Circle and Farragut Square became a fashionable residential area for Washingtonians, spurred by the construction of the British Legation at Connecticut Avenue and N Street and Alexander "Boss" Shepherd's mansion at Connecticut Avenue and K Street. On April 23, 1880, real estate developer John Sherman was issued a building permit to construct four brick houses near the southeast corner of Connecticut Avenue and M Street. No architect was listed on the permit, but John and his wife Ella are believed to have designed some of the houses they built and sold throughout their careers.

The four-story corner building was designed in the Victorian style with Gothic Revival elements. It features a tin roof, a wooden cornice with decorative ornaments, and molded brick below the cornice, windows, and on the tower. The alternately projecting bays also feature molded brick. The ribbed tin dome features eight facets, cartouche windows, and is topped with a spire.

The corner building might be one that was advertised in the Evening Star from November 1880 to February 1881: "FOR SALE – Two very fine HOUSES at the corner of Connecticut ave., Rhode Island ave., and M st. for sale...11 rooms, coal vault & c. Price $8,500. Terms easy. JOHN SHERMAN & CO..." [sic] The corner house, listed at 1756 M Street NW, was owned by William Warrington Evans from 1882 to 1901. Evans was a dentist who operated his practice in the building.

== Demonet ownership ==
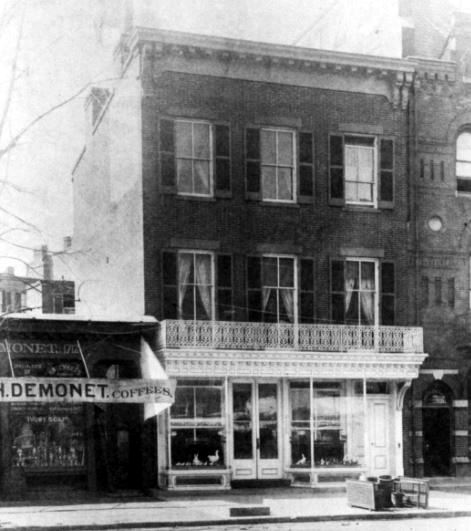
The original Demonet shop on Pennsylvania Avenue, N.W.

During the first few decades of the 20th century, many of the Victorian homes on Connecticut Avenue between Farragut Square and Florida Avenue were converted into high-end shops or replaced with small commercial buildings, resulting in the street being called the Fifth Avenue of Washington. On November 15, 1901, the building was purchased by Jules Demonet, a native of the Alsace-Lorraine region of France. The Demonet family owned a successful confectionery and catering business founded in 1848 by John Charles Demonet, Jules' father. The original shop was located in a three-story brick building at 1714 Pennsylvania Avenue NW and, due to its convenient location to the White House, was reportedly visited by President Abraham Lincoln and General Ulysses S. Grant during the Civil War. With help from his wife, Ida, who was also from Alsace-Lorraine, the business grew in popularity.

In 1884 the business was described in Historical and Commercial Sketches of Washington and Environs as "one of the leading houses of the kind in the city" and "has furnished the President's House since President Buchanan with all the confections, creams, pastries used, as well as the best families in the city." An article in The Washington Post from 1893 said, "Whenever it is desired to make a good impression upon some foreign potentate or distinguished citizen at the White House" that Demonet's business would do so. Jules received training in pastry and ice cream making in France and New York City and, along with his mother, continued the family business following his father's death.

Following the building's purchase, it underwent several alterations, including removing part of the ceiling, building an interior balcony and balustrade, adding show windows, and installing a marquee. In 1904 Jules hired the architectural firm owned by George Oakley Totten Jr. and Laussat R. Rogers to design a three-story brick addition on the south side (facing Connecticut Avenue) of the building. The shop moved from Pennsylvania Avenue to its new location on Connecticut Avenue in 1905, and the business continued to grow. Along with Magruder's Grocery Store at Connecticut Avenue and K Street and the Maison Rauscher catering firm at Connecticut Avenue and L Street, Demonet's was considered a pioneer in the commercial development of the area.

In 1911, Demonet's opened a confection factory at 2021–2023 L Street NW to produce its catering and store products. Business continued to grow during the next decade despite sugar shortages during World War I. In 1927, the Demonet family moved their shop four blocks north to 1520 Connecticut Avenue NW in Dupont Circle. Maison Rauscher, Demonet's main competitor, also moved around the same time to a building less than a block away from Demonet's new location. The Demonet family continued ownership of the corner building for the next several decades as the area continued to develop into a major commercial area.

Due to the construction of the adjoining Elizabeth Arden Building, Waggaman-Ray Commercial Row, and most notably the Mayflower Hotel, the 1100 block of Connecticut Avenue had the highest assessed property value of any block on Connecticut Avenue in 1929. The Demonet family rented the corner building to various retailers, starting with the Madame Ash dress shop in 1928, followed by tenants selling furniture, clothing, statuary, and makeup. In 1944 there was a fire inside the building when a customer's cigarette ignited a straw hat. Due to austerity and sugar shortages during World War II, the Demonet business closed in the early 1940s. The recipes and operations were handed over to the Avignone Freres confectionery and catering business at 1777 Columbia Road NW.

== Legal battle ==
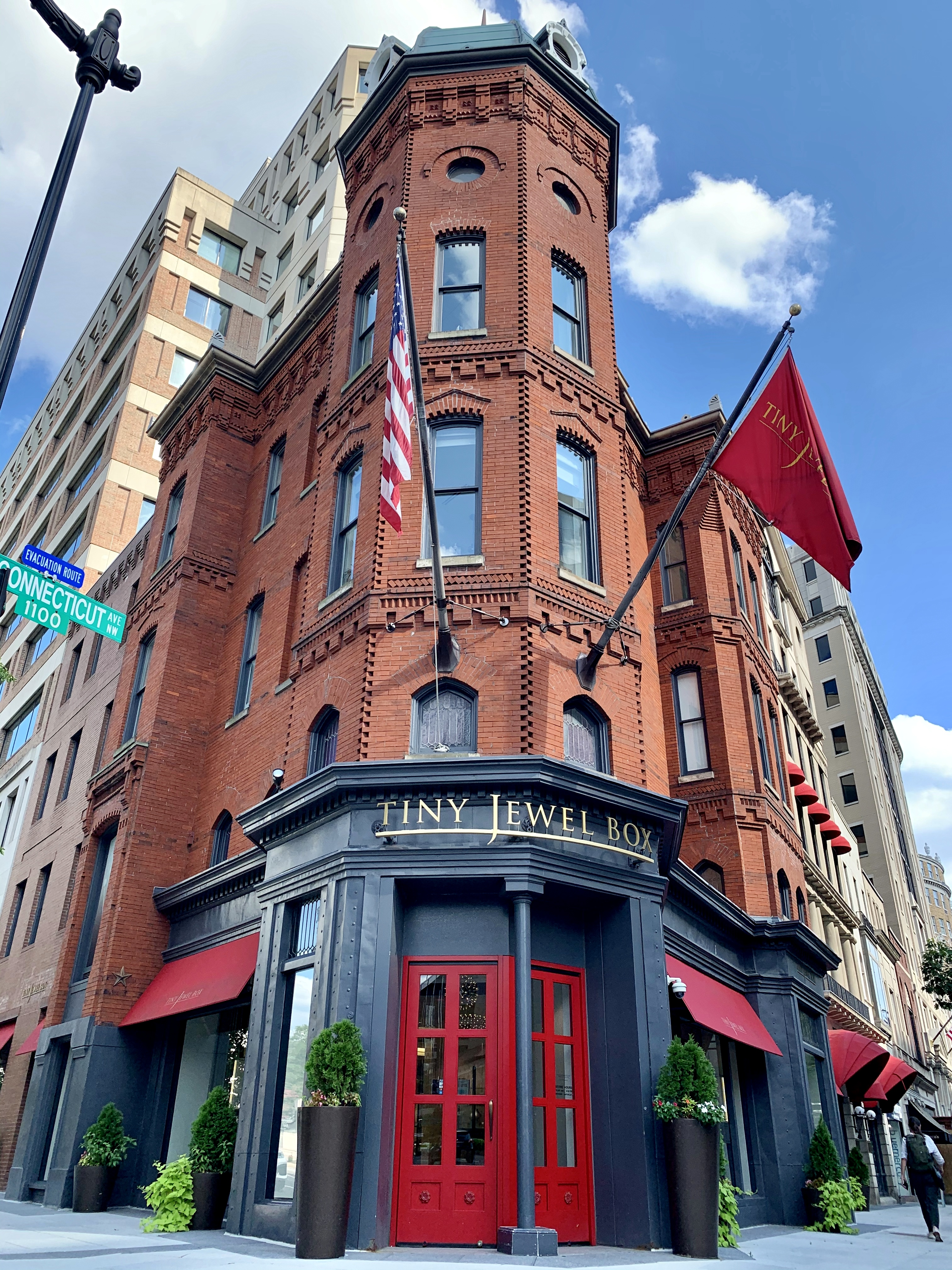
Entrance to the corner building

In 1979 the Demonet family sold the building to real estate developer Dominic F. Antonelli Jr., who planned to demolish it along with adjoining properties on M Street. He planned to replace the Demonet and adjoining site with an office building with street-level retail space. The Dupont Circle Citizens Association (DCCA) responded with an application to have the Demonet Building named a historic landmark and added to the District of Columbia Inventory of Historic Sites (DCIHS). Allison Luchs of the DCCA described the building as "an obstinate survivor from the past, hanging on as if to celebrate its centennial in 1980" and described the building's dome as "a scaled down version of the Florence Cathedral dome" that "appears today as a minor echo of the St. Matthew's Cathedral dome across the street."

Wolf Von Eckardt, architecture critic for The Washington Post who had previously written a tribute to the building in 1966, implored local officials to save the building: "I hope the Landmarks Committee members will close their eyes for a moment and imagine what that corner of Connecticut Avenue will look like if the mini-Brunelleschi were replaced with a bland 12-story box – or even an interesting 12-story box. It will look like K Street, that's what it will look like."

The city's Joint Committee on Landmarks of the National Capital (JCLNC), in partnership with the National Capital Planning Commission, added the Demonet Building, listed at 1149 Connecticut Avenue NW and 1758 M Street NW, to the DCIHS on November 23, 1979, thus preventing the building from being demolished. The committee said the building was "an exuberant example of the rich architecture which characterized post-Civil War Washington" but declined a request to add the building to the National Register of Historic Places. Following the landmark designation there were legal battles between the committee and Antonelli for two years.

In 1980 Antonelli demolished the building behind the Demonet and asked the United States Court of Appeals for the District of Columbia Circuit to overturn the historic landmark status. In A&G Limited Partnership v. Joint Committee on Landmarks of the National Capital lawyers for Antonelli argued the JCLNC was not a city agency and did not have the authority to designate historical landmarks. In 1982 a three-judge panel refused to overturn the historic landmark status. The court said it did not have jurisdiction over the JCLNC because it was not a city government agency. In response to the court's ruling, the president of a local historical preservation group said, "Generally, we're very pleased with the decision. While it did apply directly to the Demonet building...what it does for the city is to give the Joint Committee a signal to go ahead, and it preserves their effectiveness."

== Restoration and new office building ==
The Demonet Building and adjoining lot were sold in 1982 to a British subsidiary, Second British American Inc., for approximately $10 million, or around $1,000 per square foot ($11,000/m^{2}), which was a record price for downtown Washington, D.C. real estate. Viking Property Group, Inc., which was also a subsidiary of a British company, was selected as the project developer. It was the first US project for the group. Unlike other real estate development companies, Viking appreciated the building's historic status. A representative for the company stated: "What was a negative to many people in the development community was a positive attribute to the Viking Group. They thought it was worth saving and enhancing." The Dupont Circle Conservancy participated in the design of the new office building to ensure architectural cohesiveness with surrounding properties.

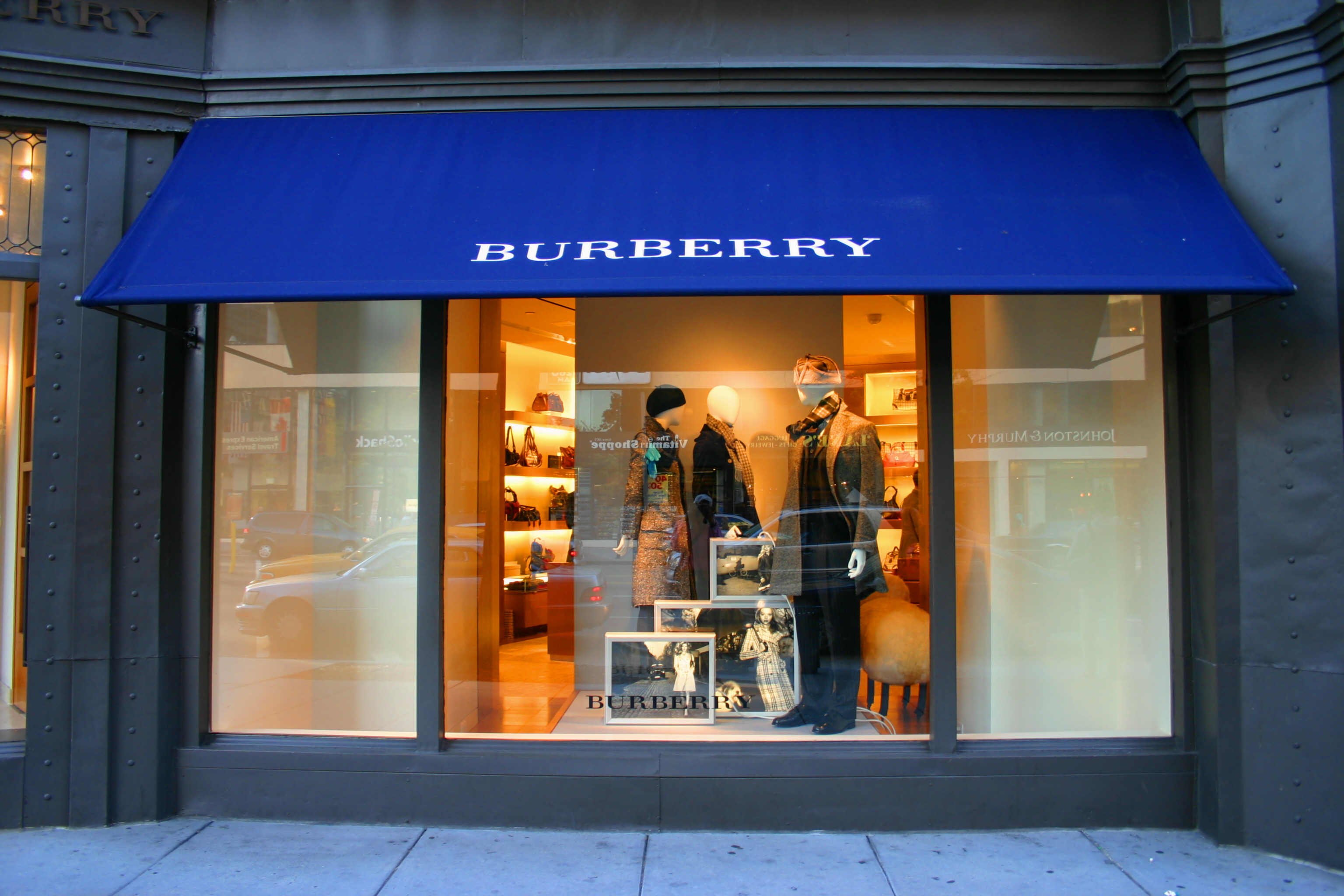
A Burberry shop was located in the Demonet Building for almost 30 years before moving to CityCenterDC.

Renovation of the original building and construction of the new 12-story postmodern office building, which includes a three-story underground parking garage, began in 1983 and was carried out by Omni Construction Inc. for $6.1 million. Richard Giegengack and Robert Larson of Skidmore, Owings & Merrill were selected to design the 134,000 sq ft (12,449 sq m) project.

To make the old and new buildings architecturally compatible, bricks were incorporated into the design of the new building's façade. Concrete floors were poured into the 12,000 sq ft (1,115 sq m) corner buildseting, and once the new building was completed, floor joists were replaced with steel beams. The roof of the corner building was converted into a terrace for the fifth floor of the new building. The sixth through twelfth floors of the new building rise above and behind the corner building and feature a beveled tower with a six-story arched window. On the M Street side, the building's eleventh and twelfth floors are set back 20 ft (6.1 m) from the first ten floors. A brick four-story historicist section was built between the two buildings to blend the corner building's cornice line.

During construction, a large beam was dropped on the original building wall, resulting in a crack that almost caused the wall to collapse, but the damage was quickly repaired. Around a year after the $35 million project was completed in 1984, the British owners rented the first floor retail space in the corner building to British luxury retailer Burberry.

The Demonet Building was sold to Japanese real estate firm Mitsui Fudosan in 1986. It was later acquired by the Stockbridge Capital Group who sold it to Alduwaliya Asset Management (AAM) in 2017 for $64,250,000. It was the third local real estate purchase by AAM, an affiliate of Qatar's Al Thani royal family.

== Notes ==
1. Sources including Alison Luchs and Wolf Von Eckardt speculate the builder, John Sherman, also designed the building.
