= Roberto Rivas Reyes =

Nicaraguan politician (1954–2022)

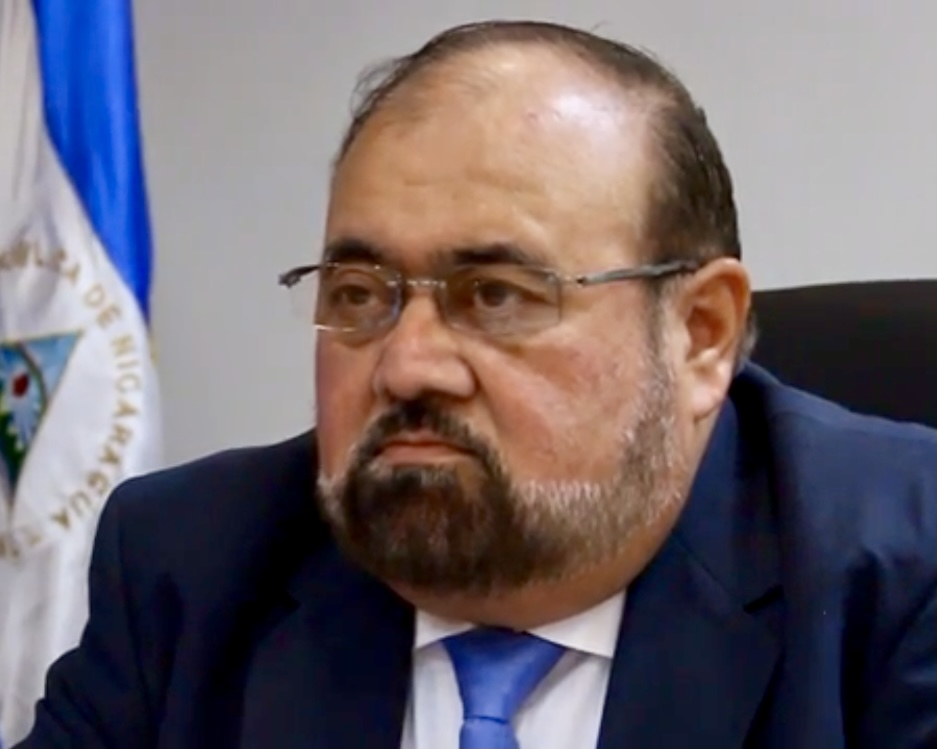
Rivas in 2013

Roberto José Rivas Reyes (6 July 1954 – 5 March 2022) was a Nicaraguan politician who was President of the Supreme Electoral Council (CSE). Rivas became a CSE magistrate in 1995, and five years later became its president.

== Biography ==
As of January 2018, vice-president Lumberto Campbell served as the CSE’s acting head, following Magnitsky Act sanctions of Rivas by the United States for corruption in December 2017. Rivas resigned the post in May 2018.

Rivas’s brother, Harold Rivas Reyes, was Nicaragua’s Ambassador to Costa Rica from February 2007 until January 2018. Nicaraguan President Daniel Ortega recalled Harold Rivas from his post shortly after Roberto was sanctioned.

== Personal life and death ==
Rivas was married to Ileana Delgado Lacayo, with whom he had four children. He died of sepsis on 5 March 2022, at the age of 67, following five months of hospitalization for COVID-19 in Managua.
