= Mary Douglas Drysdale =

American interior designer

- Occupation: Interior designer

Mary Douglas Drysdale is an American interior designer who established Drysdale Design Associates in 1980. She specializes in commercial and residential interior design and incorporates the work of contemporary artists into her designs. The company operates from Washington, D.C. Drysdale has designed projects both in the United States and overseas.

== Career ==
Mary Douglas Drysdale established Drysdale Design Associates after having worked for several years with Creative Architecture and Design, a Washington, D.C. design firm. Drysdale's drawings for the "Fan of the Future" were selected as one of five finalists in Emerson's Fan Competition of 1989. The renovation of her own residence was selected in 1989, as the winner of Dossier magazine's "Home and Garden Award."

Among early commercial projects, the Morrison House Hotel, in Alexandria, Virginia, was awarded by the National Travel Association as the "Best Inn of the Year" in 1991. Two of her restaurant projects included a renovation of La Fonda Restaurant, and the design of Café des Artistes' Restaurant in Washington's Georgetown area.

Drysdale's ability with classical detail and millwork were quickly established and in 1991, she won an American Woodworking Institute, "Award of Excellence".

Drysdale has participated in designer show houses throughout her career, in Richmond, Virginia, Washington and New York City. Subsequent to the National Symphony Orchestra Show House in the fall of 1991, in McLean, Virginia, Drysdale was selected by House Beautiful Magazine, as "one of two young designers in the country to watch," published in a story which featured her Show House room (April 1991). That same year, by Southern Accents magazine, the designer was named in their selection of "Leading Designers of the South" (June 1991).

By the mid-1990s, Drysdale had developed a style of design expression which embraced both the classicism of traditional American architecture, with a furnishings schemes reflecting the aesthetic of a more uncluttered modernist aesthetic. In 1994, Drysdale was given an "Award of Excellence in Design and Innovation in the Traditional Style", by Traditional Home magazine (May 1994). For seven years running, during the time which House Beautiful Magazine selected their picks of the Top 100 designers in America, Drysdale was included on this list from 1996 to 2002.

In 2001, Drysdale was selected as one of the "Top 200 practicing Architects and Designers in America," by Interiors and Architecture Magazines, and was invited to attend the "Applied Brilliance Conference" in California in 2001. In 2005, Ms. Drysdale was selected by This Old House Magazine, in the, "Top 40 professionals in America, Working with Old Houses." (October 2005). In 2006 the New York Observer featured her as one of "Five Hot Designers and Their Favorite Projects". In 2007 Drysdale was selected as one of Washington 's top Designers, by Washingtonian Magazine. In 2007, Spaces Magazine awarded Drysdale first place in the category of "Classical Kitchen Design" (October 2008).

Her colorful, painted, kitchens can be seen on the covers of shelter magazines, including: Kitchens & Bath (Vol. 8 number 2), Traditional Home Magazine (January 2001) and Trends Magazine (Vol. 18 number 5). Drysdale was also selected by Kohler Company in 1999, to design a kitchen for their permanent design showroom in Kohler, Wisconsin. Maytag Industries also commissioned Drysdale to design a kitchen for the 2001 Kitchen and Bath Industry Show in Florida. The kitchen was featured in The Washington Post article, "The Three Divas of Design, Barbara Barry, Anne Saks and Mary Drysdale," and appeared in two books.

Her work has been published in the United States in Architectural Digest, Veranda, Traditional Home, Southern Accents, Metropolitan Home, The Robb Report and others. Her projects have been featured in international magazines such as Casa et Jardim, Espacod', Living Brigitte Von Boch and Arte & Decoracao.

Drysdale has appeared on television segments featured on HGTV including five of Chris Madden's shows, as well as with Lynette Jennings on her program.

She has written on the subject of design, often writing the stories for her own projects. During 2008 and 2009, Drysdale wrote a cultural column, featured in Capital File Magazine, a niche media publication.

She has been a frequent public speaker on the subject of design throughout her career. She has spoken at various Museums, including the Smithsonian Museum and the Corcoran Gallery, as well as, in the venues of various design centers, including, The D + D Building in New York City, the Merchandise Mart in Chicago, Illinois, The Mart, in Atlanta, Georgia and other design centers. She has also been the keynote speaker at various Antique Shows, including the Birmingham Antique Show.

== Awards and achievements ==
- 1989 Finalist Emerson Fan Competition
- 1989 First Place Dossier Magazine, "House and Garden Award"
- 1991 Printers Association of Virginia, "Award of Excellence" for Drysdale Christmas card
- 1991 National Travel Association Award "Best Inn of the Year," Morrison House Hotel, Alexandria, Virginia
- 1991 American Woodworking Institute Award of Excellence, category: cabinetry
- 1991 Selected by House Beautiful magazine as one of "Two young Designers to Watch"
- 1992 American Woodworking Institute Award of Excellence, category: cabinetry
- 1994 Received award from Traditional Home Magazine for "Design Excellence and Innovation in the Traditional Style"
- 1994 Judge International Design Competition; São Paulo, Brazil
- 1996 Selected by Traditional Magazine and J. Lambeth Show Room to receive an award for "Distinguished Design"
- 1997 Recipient of an Award for Excellence from the Associated Builders and Contractors, for the design of the Tiny Jewel Box, a five-story retail project
- 1997 Selected by House Beautiful magazine as one of the "Best of The Best", one of the top 100 designers in America
- 1998 Recipient of Award of Excellence from Stone World magazine for the use of stone in a residential bathroom application.
- 1998 Selected by House Beautiful as one of the "Top 100"
- 1999–2003 Selected by House Beautiful magazine as one of the "Best of the Best", one of the Top 100 designers in America
- 2000 Selected by Traditional Home magazine as one of the top 16 designers in the country to participate in a Show House in NYC to benefit Breast Cancer.
- 2000 Selected by Architecture and Interiors magazines as one of the Top 200 practicing architects and designers in America.
- 2002 Selected by Robert Allen Corporation as one of the Top 15 Designers in America
- 2005 Selected by This Old House magazine as one of the Top 40 design professionals in American working with old houses.
- 2005 Selected by Fine Interiors magazine as one of America's Top 10 designers, and to participate in an Advisory Board
- 2007 Selected by Washingtonian magazine as one of Washington's top designers
- 2008 Selected by Spaces magazine as winner in the Kitchen design competition, in the category "Classic Kitchen Design"
- 2009 Nominated for the Cooper Hewitt Design Museum Award of Excellence in the category: Interior Design

== Background and education ==
Drysdale received her Bachelor of Fine Arts from George Washington University in 1974. She added course work at the "Ecole des Politiques", "La Sorbonne Universite", and the "Ecole des Beaux Arts" in Paris, France, during a three-year period in the 1970s. She also attended the Parsons School of Design, where she was selected to attend a tutorial and a master class in Industrial Design taught by Hans Kreiks.

== Sources ==
- Accents on Accessories: Ideas and Inspirations from Southern. Birmingham, Alabama, Oxmoor House, Inc., 1997. (18-21, 40, 67, 109)
- Cargill, Katrin. The Soft Furnishings Book. Mitchell Beazley, 1994. Hong Kong, Mandarin Offset, 1995.
- Cigliano, Jan. Private Washington: Residents in the Nations Capital. New York, New York, Rizzoli Publishing, 1998. (p146, 150).
- Clifton-Mogg, Caroline. Textile Style: Decorating with Antique and Exotic Fabrics. London, England: Aurum Press, 2000. (p20-3, 140–1).
- Clifton-Mogg, Caroline. Textile Style: Decorating with Antique and Exotic Fabrics. United States Edition. London, England: Aurum Press, 2000. (p20-3, 140–1).
- Colgan, Susan. Restaurant Design: Ninety Five Spaces That Work. New York, New York, Watson- Guptill Publications, 1987. (p184-185).
- Kargill, Katrin. A Passion for Pattern. New York, New York, Clarkson Potter Publishers, 1997.
- Cargill, Katrin. Fabrications. Little Brown
- Kasabian, Anna. New Home Color Book. New York, New York, Rockport Publishers.
- Kasabian, Anna. East Coast Rooms: Portfolios of 31 Interior Designers and Architects. Rockport Publishers, 2000. (p140-143).
- Kohn, Joan. It's Your Bed and Bath.
- Kohn, Joan. It's your Kitchen: Over 100 Inspirational Kitchens. Singapore, Bulfinch Press, 2003.
- Krengel, James. Kitchens: Lifestyle and Design. New York, New York, Rizzoli International Publications/ PBC. (p 54–57).
- Landis, Dylan. Designing for Small Homes. New York, New York, Rizzoli International Publications, 1995. (p88-93)
- Louie, Elaine. "Food Drawer: Yet Another Reason Why Dogs Need Thumbs. " New York Times, 31 May. 2001.
- Nickell, Karol Dewulf and Hallam, Linda. Signature Style: Creating Beautiful Interiors. Des Moines, Iowa, Meredith Books, 1999.(p39-61).
- Niles, Bo. Timeless Design. Glen Cove, New York, PBC International, 1997. (p. 100-107, 162–167).
- Pittel, Christine. House Beautiful: Colors for Your House. 2008
- Sagar, Louis. The Artful Home: Furniture, Sculpture & Objects. Madison, Wisconsin, Guild, LLC, 2003.
- Sikes, Toni. The Artful Home: Using Art and Craft to Create Living Spaces You'll Love. New York, New York, Lark Books, 2007.
- Spectacular Homes of Washington by Panache Partners.
- Strohl, Mike. New American Style. New York, New York, Rizzoli International Publications, 1997.
- Strohl, Mike. Home Styling: Contrasts in Design. New York, New York, Rizzoli International Publications, 1998. (p2-3, 4–5, 52–57).
- House Beautiful Windows, Hearst Books
- Gropp, Lou Oliver and Kennedy, Peggy. House Beautiful Paint. Hearst
