= Elizabeth Arden Building =

Building in Washington, D.C.

- U.S. National Register of Historic Places
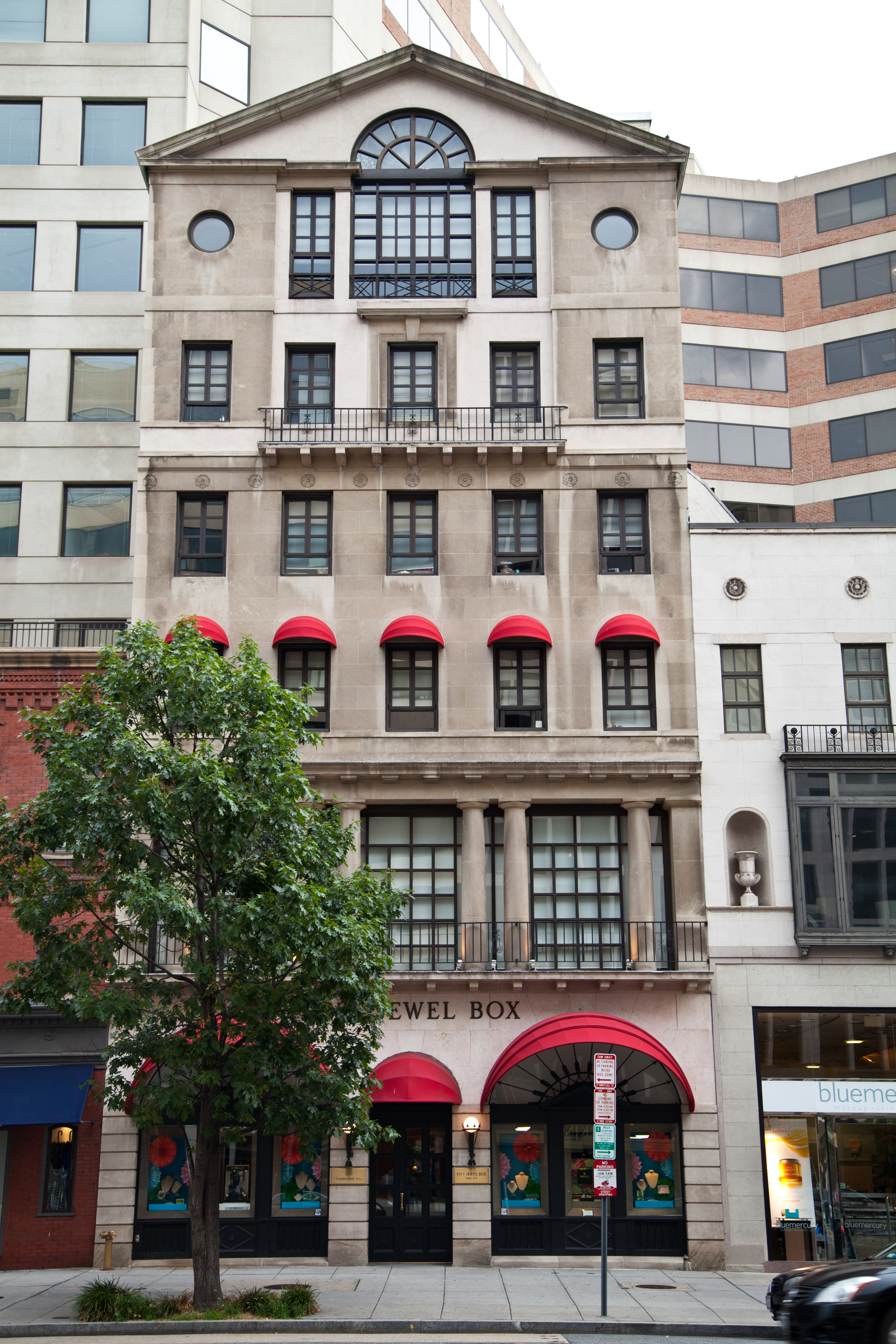
- Elizabeth Arden Building in 2012

- Location within Central Washington, D.C.
- Location: 1147 Connecticut Avenue, N.W., Washington, D.C.
- Coordinates: 38°54′19″N 77°02′25″W
- Area: 12,500 square feet (1,161 m^{2})
- Built: 1929
- Architect: Mott B. Schmidt
- Architectural style: Georgian Revival
- NRHP reference No.: 03000778
- Added to NRHP: August 18, 2003

The Elizabeth Arden Building is an historic building, located at 1147 Connecticut Avenue, Northwest, Washington, D.C., in downtown Washington, D.C.

== History ==
Built in 1929, the former Elizabeth Arden beauty salon is an example of Georgian Revival architecture, and the city's only known design of architect Mott B. Schmidt. The Elizabeth Arden Building was listed on the National Register of Historic Places in 2003. It was renovated for the Tiny Jewel Box store in 1996.

== See also ==
- Demonet Building
- National Register of Historic Places listings in Washington, D.C.
- Waggaman-Ray Commercial Row
