= Waggaman-Ray Commercial Row =

Buildings in Washington, D.C.

- U.S. National Register of Historic Places
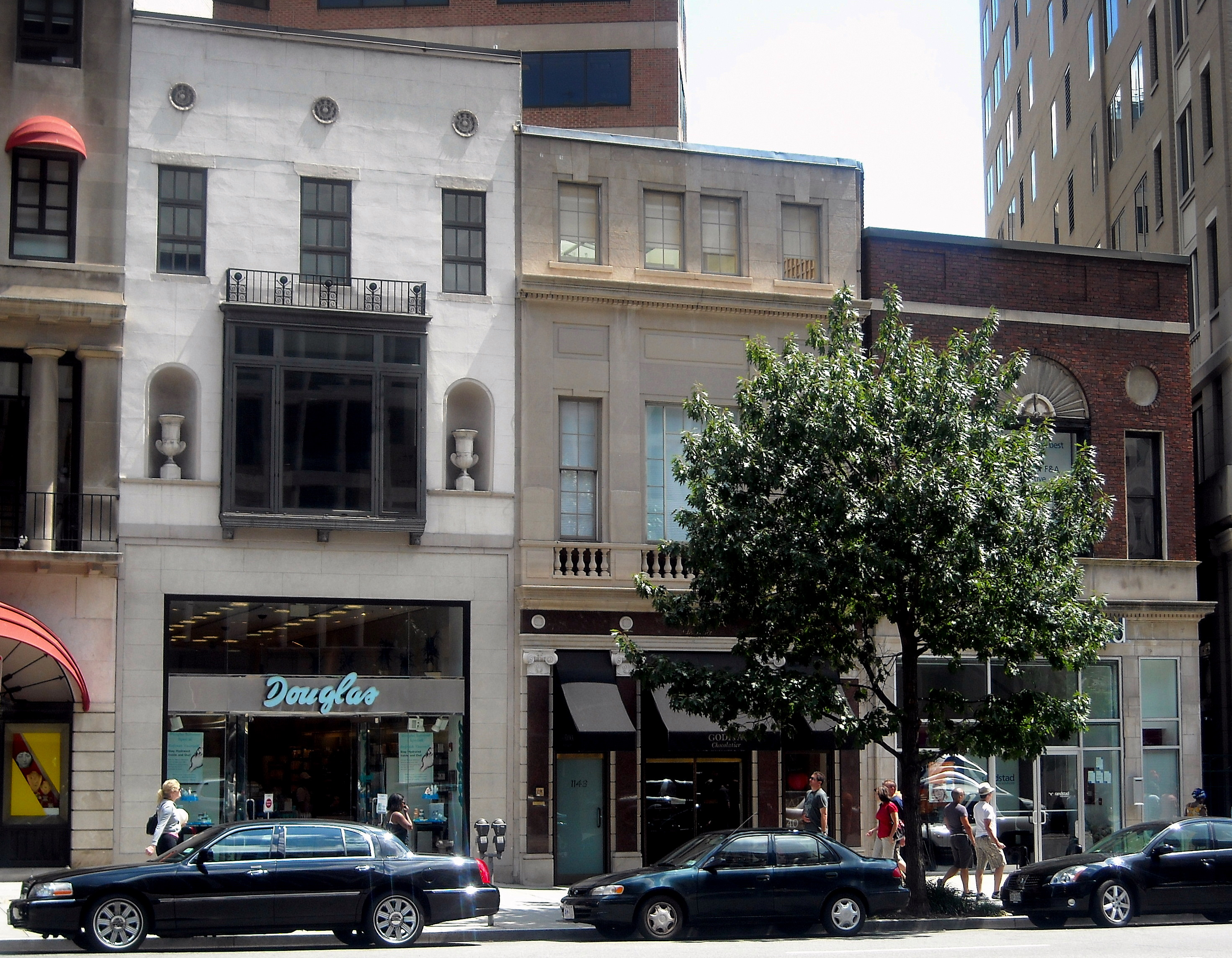
- Waggaman-Ray Commercial Row in 2008

- Location within Washington, D.C.
- Location: 1141, 1143 and 1145 Connecticut Ave., NW; Washington, D.C.
- Coordinates: 38°54′15″N 77°2′28″W
- Architectural style: Classical Revival
- NRHP reference No.: 95000162
- Added to NRHP: February 24, 1995

Waggaman-Ray Commercial Row consists of four historic structures located in the Northwest Quadrant of Washington, D.C.: 1141, 1143, 1145 Connecticut Avenue, N.W. The buildings are two and three stories and utilize restrained classical architecture to project an image of sophisticated elegance. The buildings feature planar facades with classical design motifs in low-relief.

They were listed on the National Register of Historic Places on February 24, 1995.

== History ==
Originally designed by renowned architects, Clarke Waggaman and George N. Ray of "Waggaman & Ray Architects," the commercial row was meant to rival New York City's Fifth Avenue and establish Connecticut Avenue as a premiere shopping district for Washington, D.C. Built in 1915, the buildings are one of the first projects completed by the partnership of Waggaman & Ray. The architects were known for their interest in Classical Revival and incorporated styles from the Ecole des Beaux Arts and the City Beautiful Movement.

== See also ==
- Clarke Waggaman
- Demonet Building
- Elizabeth Arden Building
- National Register of Historic Places listings in Washington, D.C.
