= Mary T. Waggaman =

American author (1846–1931)

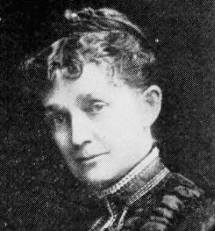
- Born: Mary Theresa McKee; September 21, 1846; Baltimore, Maryland, U.S.
- Died: July 30, 1931 (aged 84)
- Occupation: Author
- Spouse: Samuel J. Waggaman (m. 1870)
- Children: 11
- Writing career
- Pen name: Fannie Fairie (for serials); Queerquill (for poems)
- Period: Late 19th and early 20th centuries
- Subjects: Children's stories; Catholic literature

Mary Theresa McKee Waggaman (September 21, 1846 – July 30, 1931) was an American author of Catholic literature in the early 20th century who was known primarily for writing short stories for children.

== Biography ==
Mary Theresa McKee Waggaman was born on September 21, 1846, in Baltimore, Maryland, to Ester (née Cottrell) and John McKee. She attended Mount de Sales Academy in Catonsville, Maryland. Her mother died when she was young, and she moved with her father to New York during the American Civil War. Her father was arrested because of his support for the American South, and Waggaman would write "An American Bastile" about her experiences during the Civil War that was published in Ave Maria. After the Civil War she returned to Mount de Sales Academy and was valedictorian of her class in 1864.

As early as 1871 Waggaman was a published writer, starting with a poem in the January 1972 issue of Harper's Magazine. Waggaman's first short story was "Little Comrades" which she wrote to impress upon her first son the importance of his First Communion. While Waggaman initially did not share that she received funds for her writing, she eventually described how she was able to earn enough money from her writing to hire a nurse and servants who enabled her to write each day.

Waggaman is known for her writings for children and her writing for Catholic periodicals. She published under different names, using "Fannie Fairie" for serials and "Queerquill" for poems.

== Selected publications ==
- Waggaman, Mary T. (Mary Theresa). The secret of Pocomoke. OCLC 952138898.
- Waggaman, Mary T. (Mary Theresa). "Nan Nobody". Library of Congress, Washington, D.C. 20540 USA.
- Waggaman, Mary T. (1905). A double knot, and other stories.
- Waggaman, Mary Teresa (1915). White Eagle. Creative Media Partners, LLC. ISBN 978-1-378-53433-5.
- Waggaman, Mary T. (1917). Grapes of thorns. Benziger Brothers, Publishers of Benziger magazine, New York.Grapes of Thorns

== Awards and honors ==
In 1923 Waggaman won first prize for a story she submitted to the Columbian magazine published by the Knights of Columbus. There were 3,000 authors competing for this honor.

== Personal life ==
Waggaman married Samuel J. Waggaman in 1870. Together they had eleven children, six of whom were alive upon her death in 1931. One daughter, also named Mary T. Waggaman, achieved recognition as a poet. In 1942, her daughter Ester W. Neill, who was also a writer, wrote about her mother in The Book Of Catholic Authors First Series.

Waggaman died on July 30, 1931.
