= Mount de Sales Academy (Catonsville, Maryland) =

Location
- 700 Academy Road; Catonsville, (Baltimore County), Maryland 21228; United States; 39°17′9″N 76°43′17″W

Information
- Type: Private
- Denomination: Roman Catholic (Dominicans)
- Patron saint: Saint Francis de Sales
- Established: 1852; 174 years ago
- Founder: Order of the Visitation of Holy Mary
- Sister school: Mount Saint Joseph High School
- Oversight: Roman Catholic Archdiocese of Baltimore
- NCES School ID: 00578546
- Principal: Sister Ann Dominic Mahowald, O.P.
- Staff: 30
- Faculty: 50
- Grades: 9–12
- Gender: Girls
- Enrollment: 460 (2024)
- Average class size: 16
- Student to teacher ratio: 10:1
- Hours in school day: 6.5
- Campus size: 10 acres
- Campus type: Suburban
- Colors: Blue and White
- Song: "Hail to you, dear Mount de Sales"
- Athletics conference: IAAM
- Mascot: Sailor
- Team name: Sailors
- Rival: Seton Keough (Closed 2017)
- Accreditation: Middle States Association of Colleges and Schools
- Publication: The View from the Cupola
- Newspaper: Anchor
- Yearbook: Ionic Columns
- Tuition: $19,850 (2025-2026)
- Alumni: Audrey Powers, Juliette Whittaker, Isabella Whittaker
- Website: www.mountdesales.org
- Mount de Sales Academy
- U.S. National Register of Historic Places
- Location within Maryland Location within the United States
- Location: 700 Academy Rd., Catonsville, Maryland
- Area: 10.3 acres (4.2 ha)
- Built: 1852
- Architect: Curley, James & Son; Baldwin, E.F.
- Architectural style: Classical Revival, Italianate
- NRHP reference No.: 86001187
- Added to NRHP: May 30, 1986

Mount de Sales Academy is an all-girls secondary school located in Catonsville in unincorporated Baltimore County, Maryland. The school is located near the city of Baltimore and within the Roman Catholic Archdiocese of Baltimore.

The school is affiliated with the Roman Catholic Church and is partially staffed by the Dominican Sisters of St. Cecilia.

Mount de Sales Academy was founded in 1852 by the Visitation Sisters as a boarding school for girls. Now teaching only girls it now serves as a college-preparatory school. It was the first institution in Baltimore County to offer education to women of all religious denominations.

== Reputation ==
Mount de Sales Academy has been named one of the top 50 Catholic schools in the country by the Catholic High School Honor Roll each year since 2004 on the basis of academics, Catholic identity, and civic education . It is the only school in the state of Maryland to be included in the list.

== Campus and Buildings ==
Mount de Sales is located on 12 acres (49,000 m^{2}) of land, from which one can see the Inner Harbor and the Baltimore city skyline. The back yard of the school is home to a garden featuring a statue of the Blessed Virgin Mary. The campus also includes the Center for Performing Arts and Student life (opened in 2021), athletic fields, a convent, and a gymnasium.

Most classes are still held in the original school building, begun in 1852 and expanded in the 1860s. The main building, which is listed on the National Register of Historic Places, retains architectural traces of the cloistered sisters of the Visitation Order who founded the school. The chapel, located in the center of the main building, is the oldest place of worship still in use in Baltimore. The stained glass windows in the chapel, original to the building, were cast in the same place and manufacturing technique as the famous stained glass of the Cathedral of Chartres, France. The windows are located at the back of the building, as Catholics in the area were undergoing much persecution at the time of the building's planning, and its founders wished to avoid vandalism and protest.

Over the years, the chapel has had several pipe organs. The current instrument was built by George Jardine & Son in 1884. This historic pipe organ was played in recital during the Organ Historical Society Convention in July 2024.

The building also includes the Music Hall, which has details such as trompe-l'œil painting and is where graduation is held annually, the Padre Pio library, which contains relics of that saint and a mosaic in his honor, computer labs, a spacious art studio, the Ramona Carrigan Science Center, research lab, and newly added STEM and robotics rooms.

The Regina Keenan Knott Alumnae Hall was formerly an infirmary for the school's boarding students. At one time it was connected to the main building by a walkway which has since been demolished. The building's front is the opposite of the main building so that visitors would not see any of the sick or otherwise ailing girls. The building now houses the school's development and alumnae relations groups.

The Constance and Samuel Pistorio Sports Complex was dedicated in 1999. Its design was modeled after the architecture of the campus' historic buildings. The facility is located across from the main building, on a piazza featuring gardens and a bronze statue of Saint Joseph the Worker.

The St. Cecilia Center, a 24,000-square foot building that opened in 2021, features music and dance classrooms, practice rooms for student performers, fully equipped scene shop and storage space for technical theatre students, 400-seat fixed lower-level orchestral section, 200-moveable seat upper-level multi-use space, and control room for audio, lighting, and visual equipment.

== Brother School ==
The nearby all-boys Mount Saint Joseph High School is the Brother School of Mount de Sales Academy. The two schools share their long history with each other. In the present day:

- The schools jointly produce theatrical events
- The schools cooperate on bus service
- Sailor cheerleaders support Gaels' sporting events
- The schools hold joint social events such as dances
- The schools share many school clubs

== Notable alumnae ==
- Mary T. Waggaman (1864), author of Catholic literature
- Pat Moran (1964), filmmaker
- Audrey Powers (1994), Vice President of Mission and Flight Operations of American aerospace and spaceflight company Blue Origin
- Brigid Kemmerer (1996), author
- Nicolette Jennings (2015), Miss Florida USA 2019
- Isabella Whittaker (2020), track & field athlete, Olympian
- Juliette Whittaker (2022), track & field athlete, Olympian

== Gallery ==
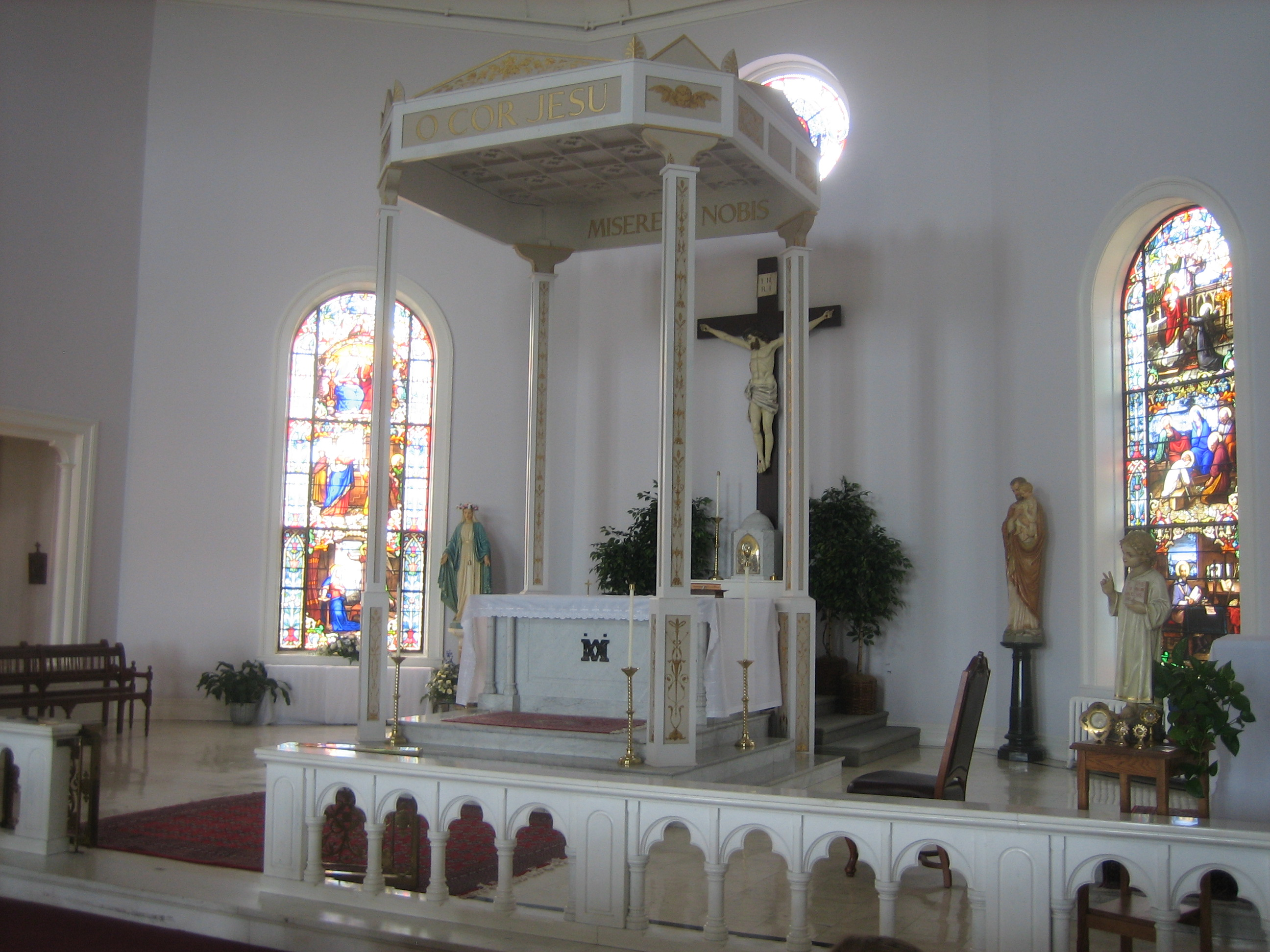
Chapel of St. Francis de Sales at Mount de Sales

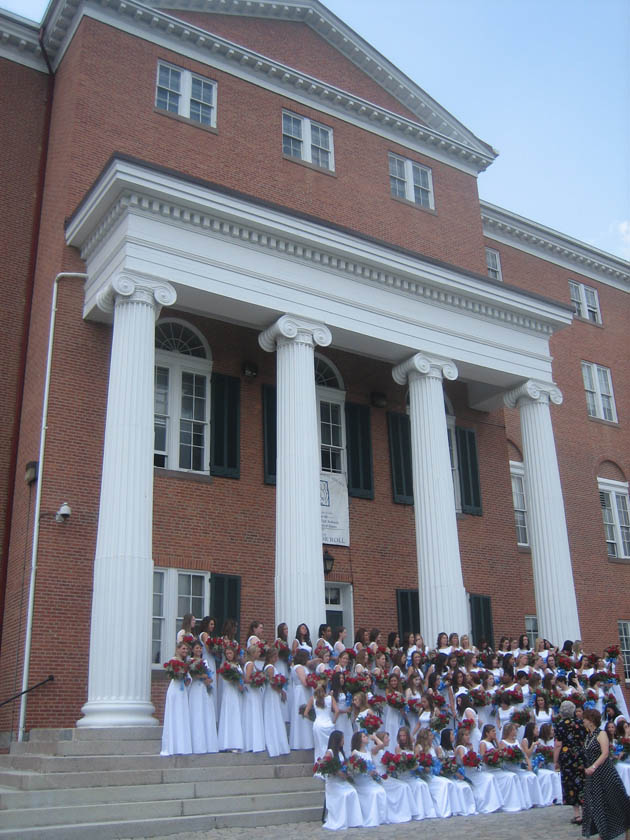
Class photo at graduation on the front steps of the main building

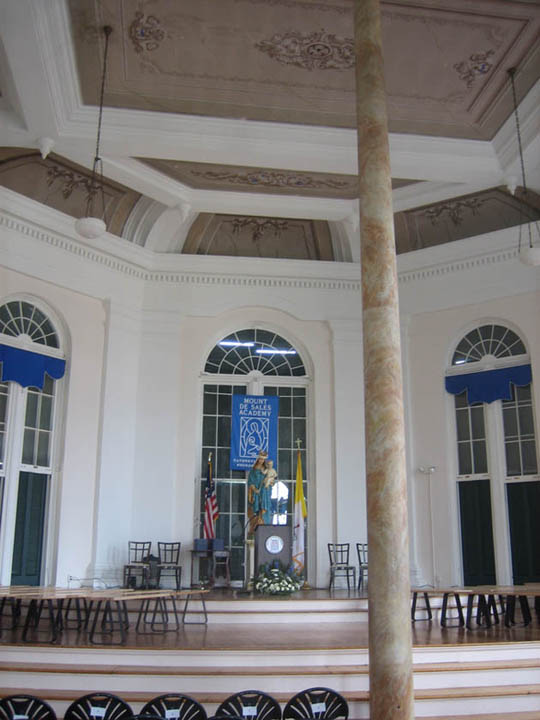
The Music Hall

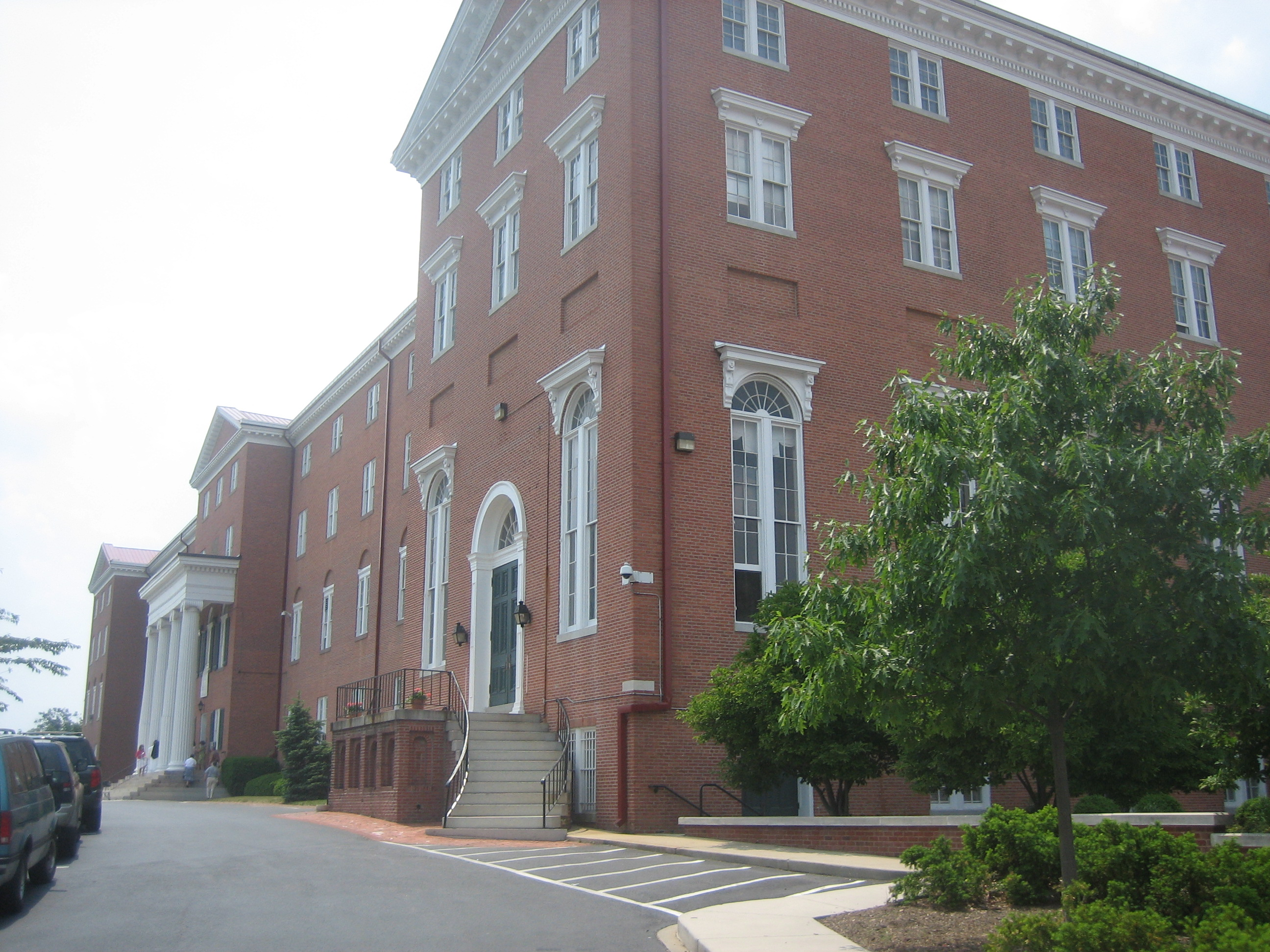
The Main Building

== See also ==
- National Catholic Educational Association
