= Supreme Electoral Council (Nicaragua) =

Nicaraguan elections council

The Supreme Electoral Council (Spanish: Consejo Supremo Electoral, CSE) is the public body responsible for organizing elections in Nicaragua.

Roberto Rivas Reyes was president of the CSE from July 2000 until his death in 2022, though as of January 2018, vice-president Lumberto Campbell functioned as acting head of the organization. Campbell was named to the Council by the National Assembly in 2014.

Previous presidents of the CSE include Mariano Fiallos Oyanguren (1984 to 1996) and Rosa Marina Zelaya (beginning in the 1990s).

== Past presidents ==
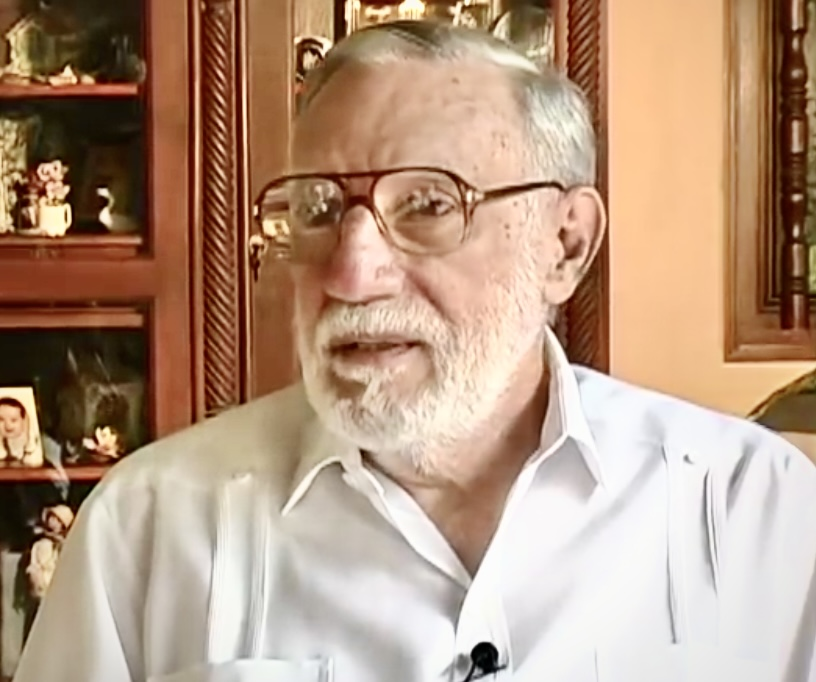
Mariano Fiallos Oyanguren

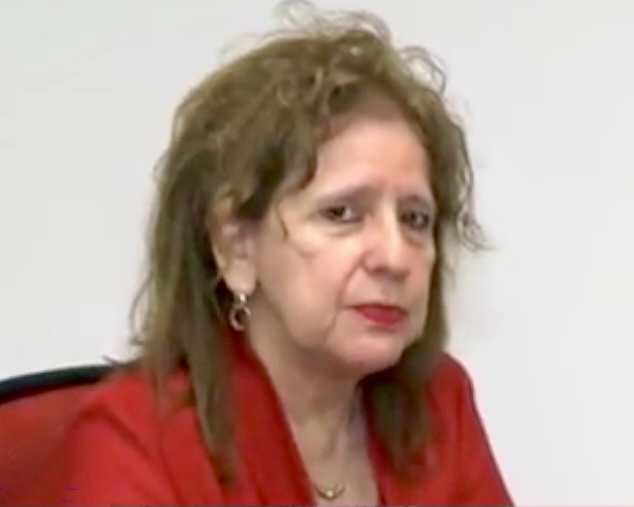
Rosa Marina Zelaya

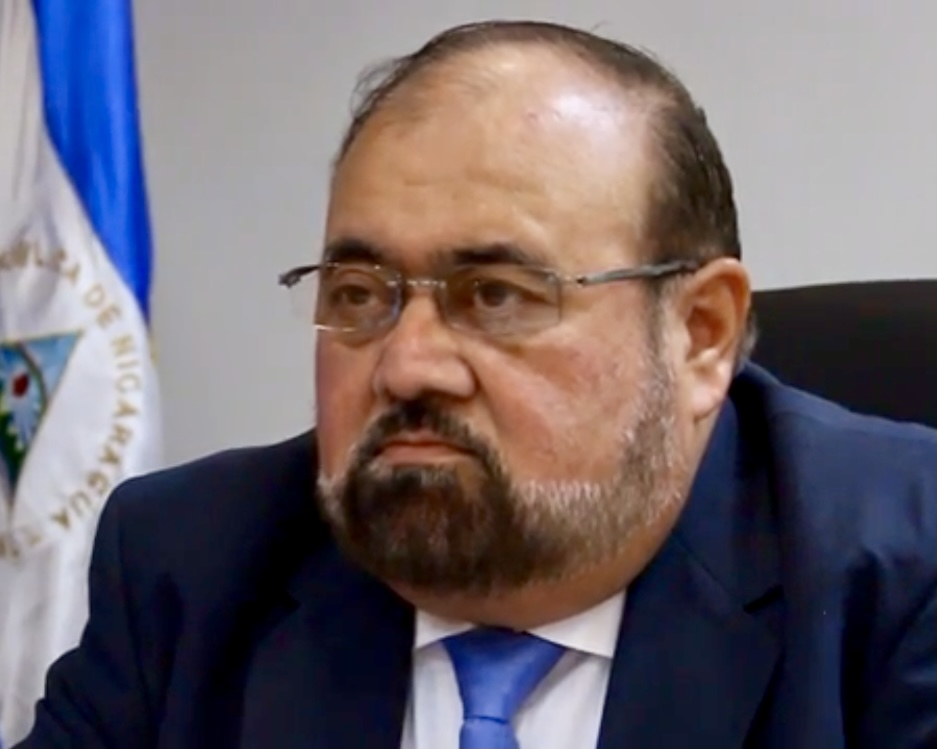
Roberto Rivas Reyes
