= Exorcist steps =

Steps in Washington, D.C.

Coordinates: 38°54′19.96″N 77°4′12.59″W

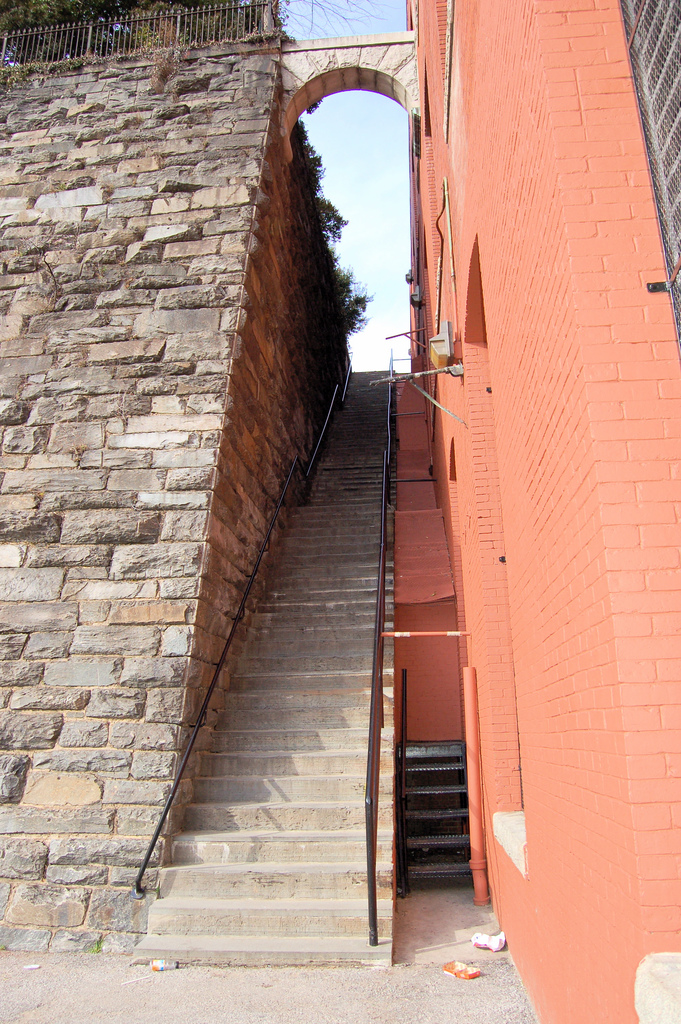
The Exorcist steps in Georgetown, Washington, D.C.

The Exorcist steps are concrete stairs, continuing 36th Street, descending from the corner of Prospect St and 36th St NW, down to a small parking lot, set back from the intersection of M Street NW, Canal Rd NW, and Whitehurst Freeway NW in the Georgetown neighborhood of Washington, D.C., famous for being featured in the 1973 film The Exorcist. The steps were built in 1895 by George Killeen, a prominent local Democratic figure, during construction of the adjacent Capital Traction Company Barn for cable cars, serving as a lightwell and public property access right of way. There is a family legend of George Killeen that the wall's construction was a handshake agreement and that Killeen was never paid for its completion. Before the Exorcist association, the stairs were informally called "Hitchcock steps" for famed suspense and horror film director Alfred Hitchcock.

For The Exorcist, the steps were padded with half-inch-thick (13 mm) rubber to film the fall of the character Father Damien Karras. Because the house from which Karras falls was set back slightly from the steps, the film crew constructed an eastward extension with a false front to the house in order to film the scene.

In a ceremonial Halloween weekend in 2015 that featured the film's director William Friedkin and screenwriter William Peter Blatty (who also wrote the book on which the film is based), the Exorcist steps were recognized as a D.C. landmark and official tourist attraction by Mayor of the District of Columbia Muriel Bowser, with a plaque unveiled at the base of the steps recognizing its importance to Washington, D.C. and film history.

== See also ==
Other staircases famous for their use in films:

- Potemkin Stairs
- Rocky Steps
- Joker Stairs
- The Music Box Steps
