= Metropolitan Railroad =

Former streetcar company in Washington, D.C.

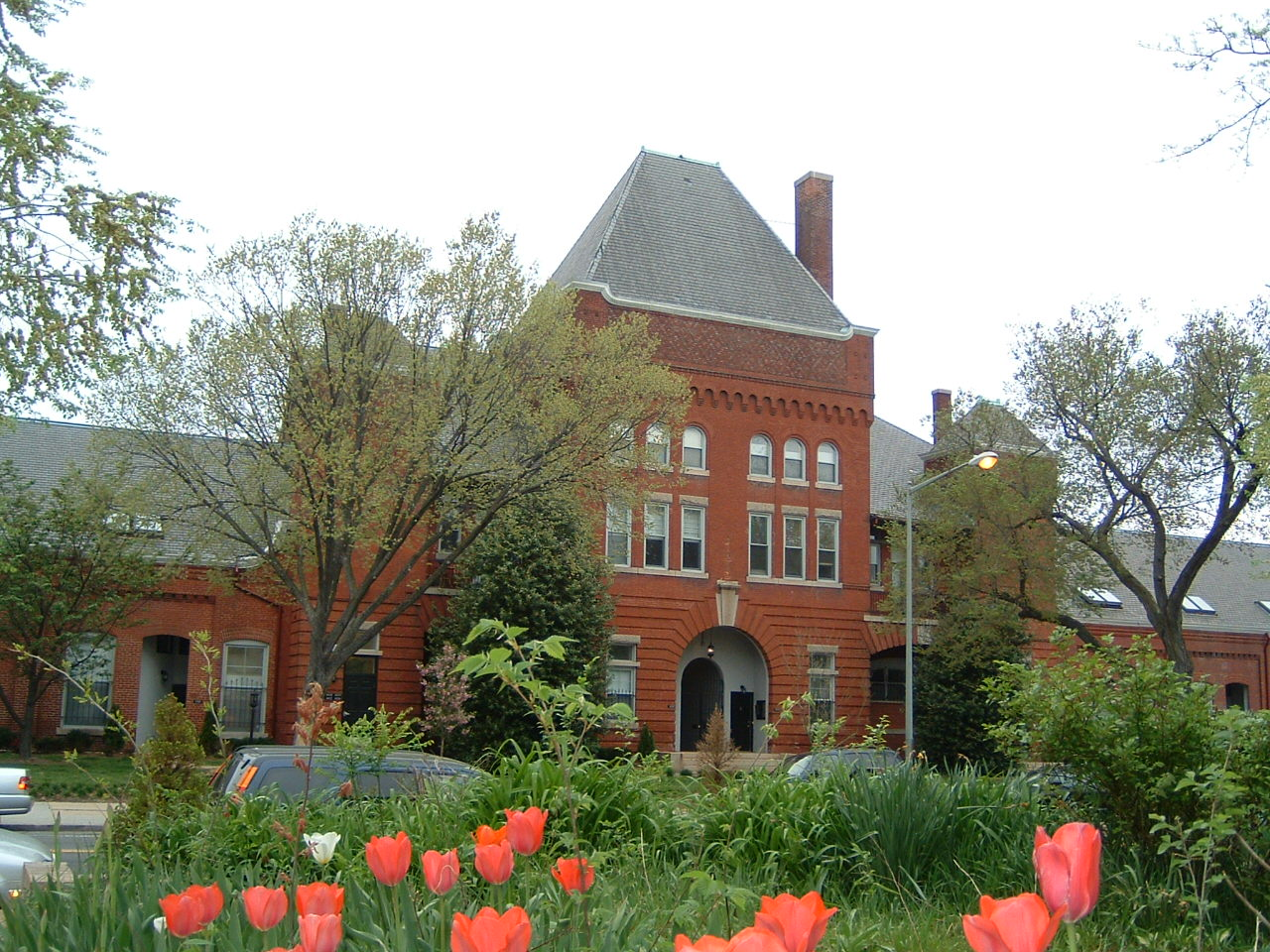
East Capitol Street Car Barn, built by the Metropolitan Railroad

The Metropolitan Railroad was the second streetcar company to operate in Washington, D.C., the capital city of the United States. It was incorporated and started operations in 1864, running from the Capitol to the War Department and along H Street NW in downtown. It added lines on 9th Street NW, on 4th Street SW/SE, along Connecticut Avenue to Dupont Circle, to Georgetown, to Mount Pleasant and north along Georgia Avenue. In the late 19th century, it was purchased by the Washington Traction and Electric Company and on February 4, 1902, became a part of the Washington Railway and Electric Company.

== Origins ==
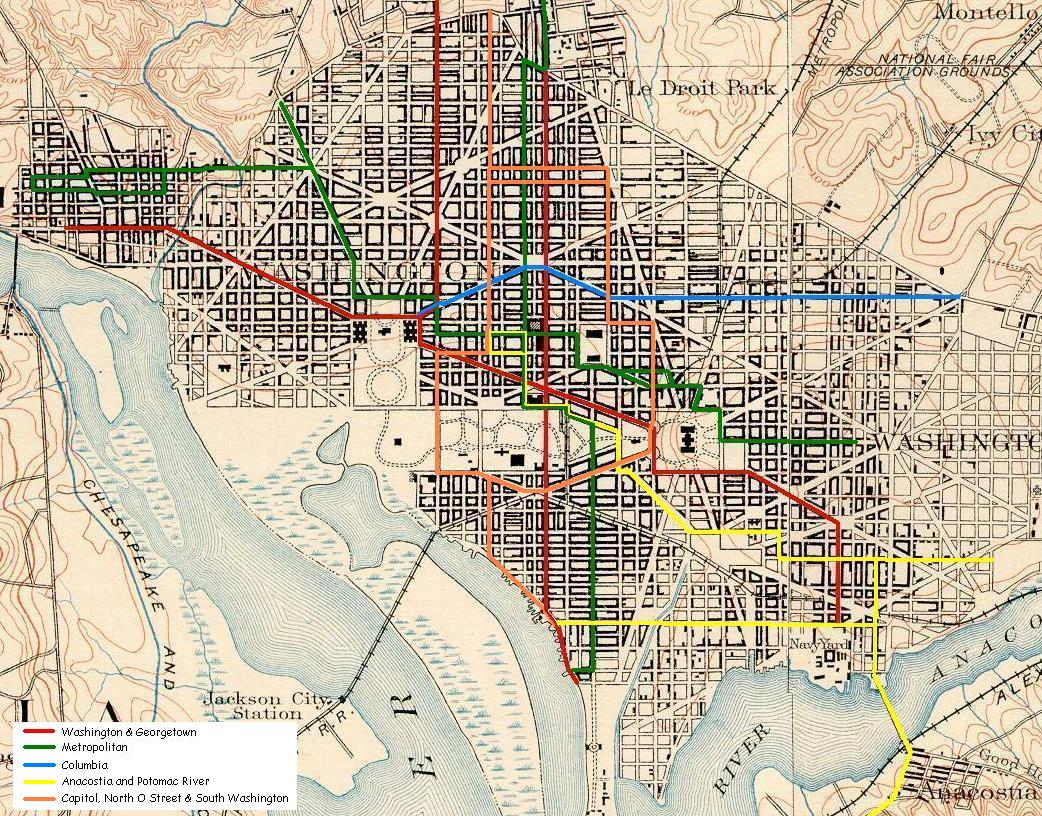
1888 map of the Washington, D.C., streetcar system at the end of the horsecar era

The Metropolitan Railroad Company, was incorporated on July 1, 1864, two years after the Washington and Georgetown Railroad Company. It opened two lines: one ran from the Capitol to 14th and I Streets NW and a second along H Street NW from Massachusetts Avenue NW to 17th Street NW. When it started, it used two-horse cars, but in 1865 it switched to smaller cars pulled by one horse.

An amendment, approved March 3, 1865, allowed certain branches and extensions, including among them a branch from D Street North south on Fourth Street West to Fort McNair (then the Arsenal), and an extension from New Jersey Avenue and A Street North east on A Street, south on First Street East, and east on East Capitol Street to Ninth Street East. However, instead of building on Fourth Street north to D Street, the company turned the line northwest on Missouri Avenue, north on Sixth Street West, and west on B Street North to reach the south end of the Ninth Street branch. This was not authorized by any laws, but several company officers were on the city Board of Public Works, which did not object.

== Expansion ==
In 1872, it began operations on a 9th Street line with a terminus on M Street NW.

In that same year it bought the Union Railroad Company, whose charter of January 19, 1872, enabled the Metropolitan to build a line from downtown D.C. to Georgetown. The line ran from the Treasury Building at 15th Street and New York Avenue NW to Georgetown across the P Street Bridge and then on various streets in Georgetown.

In 1873, the Metropolitan bought the Boundary and Silver Spring Railway Company, Its charter—also issued on January 19, 1872—permitted the creation of a line from Boundary Street NW (today's Florida Avenue) to the Maryland-D.C. boundary along the Washington City and Rockville Turnpike (a.k.a. Seventh Street Extended NW, a.k.a. Brightwood Avenue NW, and today called Georgia Avenue NW). The Metropolitan fulfilled about half of this, running tracks on Boundary, then north on Georgia to Rock Creek Church Road NW.

In June 1874, the Metropolitan acquired the Connecticut Avenue and Park Railway. Its charter of July 13, 1868, enabled the Metropolitan to lay tracks from 17th and H Streets NW north to K Street, thence north-northwest on Connecticut Avenue to Boundary Street. The first horsecars ran on this line in April 1873 but only as far north as P Street, and presently the city paved over the tracks between P and Boundary. In 1883, after residents of Washington Heights petitioned the railroad to bring service to their neighborhood, the Metropolitan exhumed the tracks and established a shuttle service between P and Boundary.

By 1888, the Metropolitan had built additional lines down 4th Street NW/SW to the Arsenal at P Street SW and on East Capitol Street to 9th Street.

== Switch to electricity ==
The old Boundary and Silver Spring line was never profitable. On October 18, 1888, the day after electric streetcar operations began in Washington, Congress authorized the Brightwood Railway to purchase and electrify the Metropolitan's line and to extend it to the District boundary at Silver Spring. In 1890, the Metropolitan sold the line to the upstart company.

In 1890, as the city's streetcars switched to electric and mechanical power, the Metropolitan experimented with batteries but found them unsatisfactory. On August 2, 1894, Congress ordered the Metropolitan to switch to an underground electrical power system pioneered in Budapest, Hungary. The company complied, installing the underground sliding shoe system on the north–south line in January 1895. It was the first successful installation of such a system in the Western Hemisphere, but still had drawbacks. In the winter, the plow would get jammed by snow and ice; in the summer, the conduits swelled shut.

In 1895, Metropolitan built a massive, Romanesque-style car barn on the corner of 4th and P Streets SW. But the railroad was in trouble, beset by a prolonged labor strike and saddled with a reputation for poor service. Washington, D.C., newspaper reporter George Herbert Harries was hired to be president of the Metropolitan Railroad. Within two years, Harries restored the railroad to profitability.

The Metropolitan switched the rest of its system to electric power on July 7, 1896, which proved a big year for the company. It built a loop on 35th and 36th Streets NW to Prospect Street NW to connect it to the Georgetown Car Barn. It extended service along East Capitol Street to 15th Street and built the East Capitol Street Car Barn, a Romanesque Revival-style building designed by Waddy Wood, to serve as a barn, repair shop, and administrative offices (photo);

An Act of Congress passed on February 27, 1897, allowed the Metropolitan to extend its Connecticut Avenue line northeast on Columbia Road, then north-northwest on Mount Pleasant Road to Park Road. Service began on June 6, 1900.

== Metropolitan Coach Company ==
After the Herdic Phaeton Company went under in 1896, the Metropolitan Railroad started a coach company running horse-drawn coaches. It began carrying passengers from 16th and T Streets NW to 22nd and G Streets NW, but the route changed, later running from 16th and U Streets NW to the Treasury Building and then along Pennsylvania Avenue NW to 9th Street NW. It began operations on May 1, 1897, with a car barn at 1914 E Street NW. In 1904 it became its own corporation.

== End of the line ==
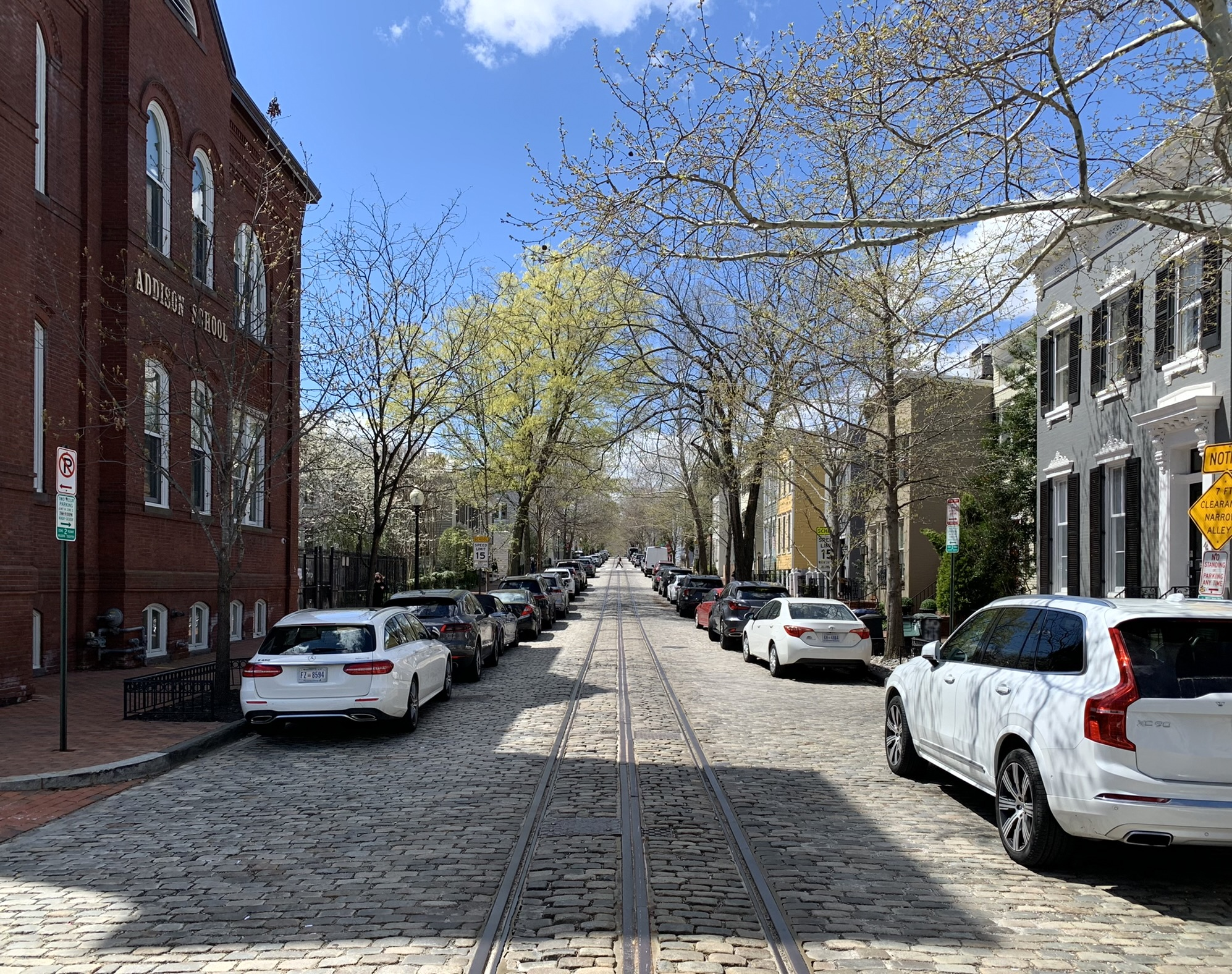
P Street NW, in Georgetown, features streetcar tracks installed by the Metropolitan Railroad in the 1890s.

Between 1896 and 1899, three businessmen purchased controlling interests in several streetcar companies, including the Metropolitan Railroad Company. They incorporated the Washington Traction and Electric Company on June 5, 1899, as a holding company for these interests. But the holding company had borrowed too heavily and paid too much for the subsidiaries and was quickly in financial trouble. Because of this, Congress authorized the Washington and Great Falls on June 5, 1900, to acquire the stock of any and all of the railways and power companies owned by Washington Traction. When Washington Traction defaulted on its loans on June 1, 1901, Washington and Great Falls moved in to take its place. On February 4, 1902, Washington and Great Falls changed its name to the Washington Railway and Electric Company, reincorporated as a holding company and exchanged stock in Washington Traction and Electric one for one for stock in the new company (at a discounted rate). This was the end of the Metropolitan Railroad Company.
