= George Herbert Harries =

United States Army general (1860–1934)

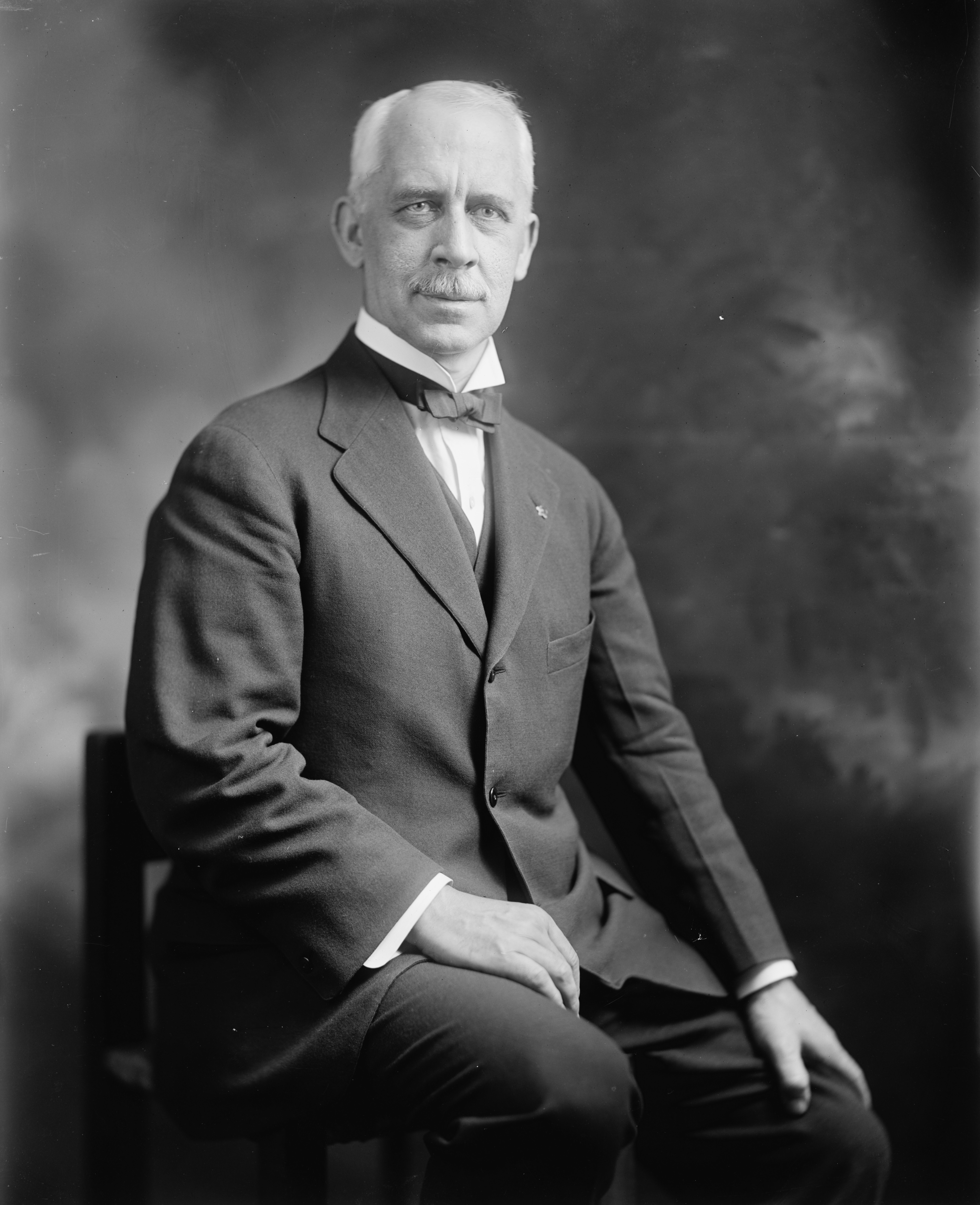
- Born: September 19, 1860; Haverfordwest, Wales
- Died: September 28, 1934 (aged 74); Waverly, Maryland
- Burial place: Arlington National Cemetery
- Spouse(s): Elizabeth Langley (1883–1925, her death), Alice Loveland (1927–1934, his death)
- Military career
- Allegiance: United States
- Branch: United States Army
- Service years: 1889–1915; 1917–1924
- Rank: Major General
- Unit: District of Columbia National Guard
- Commands: 1st District of Columbia Volunteer Infantry; District of Columbia National Guard; 1st Brigade, Nebraska National Guard; 59th Depot Brigade; 186th Infantry Brigade; Base Section Number 5 Port of Brest; 173rd Infantry Brigade; U.S. Military Mission, Berlin, Germany
- Conflicts: American Indian Wars; Spanish–American War; World War I
- Awards: Army Distinguished Service Medal; Navy Distinguished Service Medal
- Other work: Business executive Newspaper editor

George Herbert Harries (September 19, 1860 – September 29, 1934) was an American businessman and newspaper editor. After leaving journalism for a business career, he served as president of the Metropolitan Railroad Corporation, Washington and a vice president of the Washington Railway and Electric Company. A longtime vice president of the H. M. Byllesby and Company engineering and management consulting firm, he served as president of several Byllesby affiliates while restoring them to profitability, including the Louisville Gas and Electric Company and the Fargo and Moorhead Street Railroad Company.

Harries was also a longtime member of the National Guard. A veteran of the American Indian Wars, Spanish–American War, and World War I, he attained the rank of major general. He was a recipient of the Army Distinguished Service Medal and Navy Distinguished Service Medal.

== Early life ==
Harries was born in Haverfordwest, Wales on September 19, 1860, a son of John Harries and Sarah (Davies) Harries. He was raised in Haverfordwest, where he attended the local schools. (Note: According to one source, Harries began the program of instruction at Royal Military Academy Sandhurst, but left before graduating after deciding to immigrate to Canada.)

The Harries family immigrated to the United States while Harries was 18, and John Harries worked for the U.S. government as an Indian agent. Harries began working on the western frontier of Canada and the United States; while in his teens and early twenties, Harries was a deputy sheriff and aided the North-West Mounted Police in pursuing horse thieves and crooked gamblers. He later owned a newspaper in Winnipeg, which he operated successfully until it was destroyed in a fire.

Harries was visiting his father in Washington, D.C. when he learned of the Winnipeg fire. Instead of returning to Winnipeg, he obtained a position as a reporter with Washington's National Republican newspaper. He soon moved from the National Republican to The Washington Star. In 1888, U.S. Congressman William Harrison Martin took offense to articles Harries had written about him, and responded by attacking him in the United States Capitol. Harries preferred charges; Martin pleaded guilty to assault and was fined five dollars. As a reporter, Harries covered the Wounded Knee campaign for the Star, and he later advanced to editorial writer, then associate editor.

== Continued career ==
In 1895, Harries left journalism for a career in business when he was appointed president of Washington's Metropolitan Street Railway Company. The company had a reputation for poor service and was experiencing a prolonged labor strike when Harries took over, and within two years he had succeeded in restoring it to profitability. From 1896 to 1900, Harries was affiliated with the Washington Board of Trade, first as secretary, and later as president.

When the Washington Railway and Electric Company was formed in 1900, Harries was appointed vice president, and he served in this position until 1911. In 1911, he joined Chicago's H. M. Byllesby and Company as a vice president. The Byllesby company was an engineering and management consulting firm with utility and transportation interests in more than 100 cities and towns throughout the United States. Harries specialized in reorganizing failing companies and restoring them to profitability, and the corporations of which he served as president while performing this function for Byllesby included: the Louisville Gas and Electric Company; Arkansas Valley (Colorado) Railway, Light and Power Company; Fargo and Moorhead Street Railway Company; Nebraska Power Company; and Council Bluffs (Iowa) Gas & Electric Company.

== Military career ==
=== Early service ===
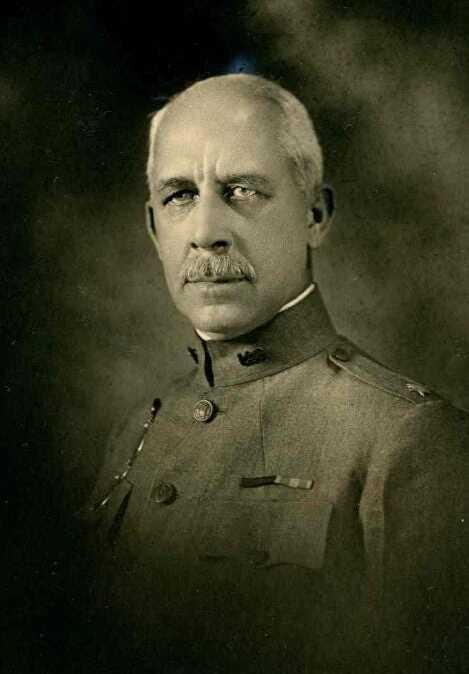
Harries as a brigadier general commanding the DC National Guard circa 1915

In 1889, Harries joined the District of Columbia National Guard and was assigned to its brigade headquarters with the rank of staff sergeant. While working as a reporter, he also served as an aide de camp to General Nelson A. Miles during the Ghost Dance War in South Dakota. After the fighting, Harries served on the committee that established the boundary between the Pine Ridge and Rosebud Indian reservations and oversaw transport of the Northern Cheyenne to their reservation in Lame Deer, Montana. In 1892, he received his DC National Guard commission as a first lieutenant. He served in staff positions with the organization's brigade headquarters including inspector of rifle practice, and advanced to the rank of major.

=== Spanish–American War ===
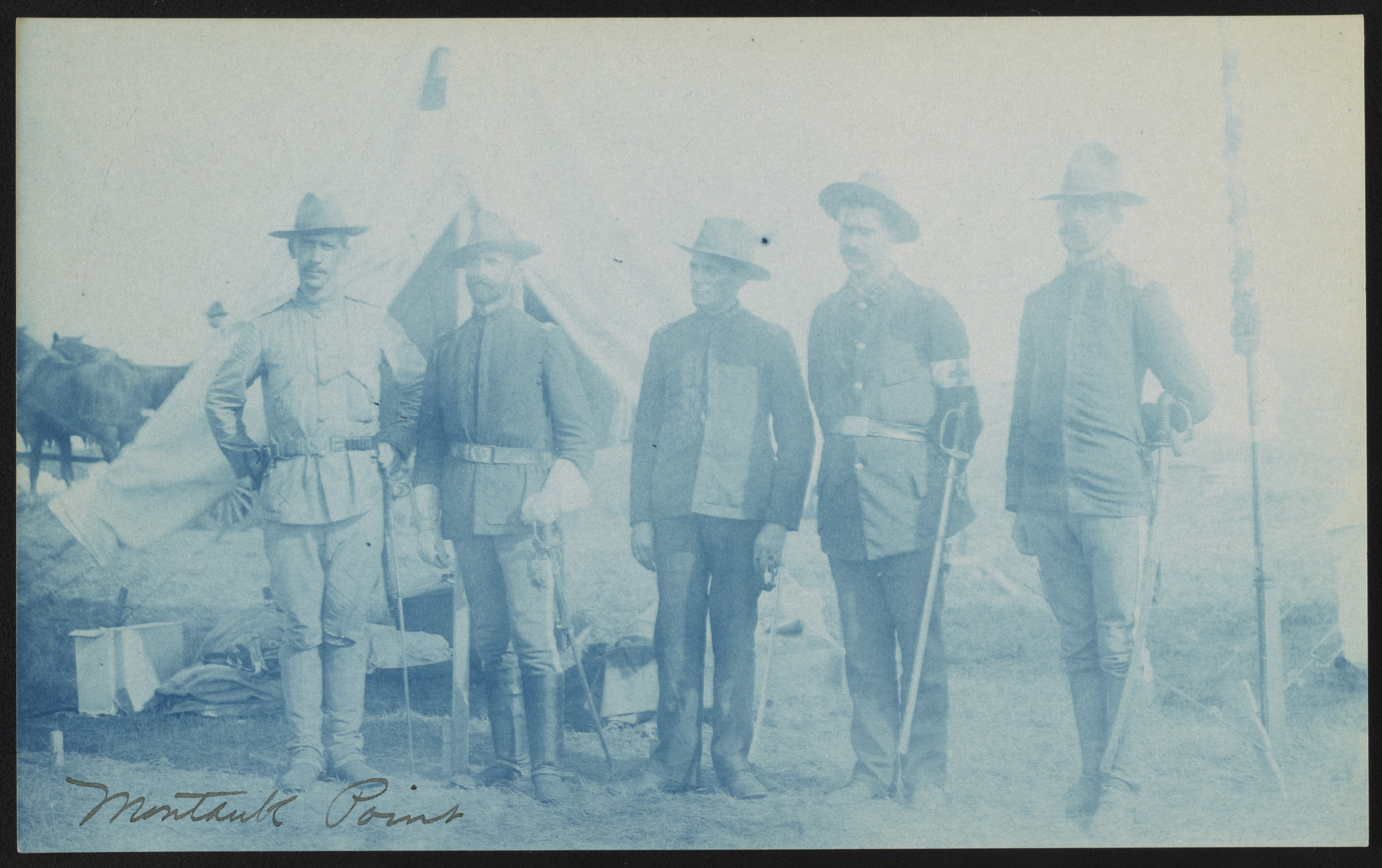
Harries (left) with staff at Rough Riders military camp, Montauk Point, New York, 1898

In 1897, the D.C. National Guard's commander, Albert Ordway, died after an extended illness. Harries was selected to replace him and was promoted to brigadier general. In April 1898, troops of the D.C. National Guard were ordered to active federal service for the Spanish–American War. They were organized as the 1st District of Columbia Volunteer Infantry, and Harries received a federal appointment to command them as a colonel. the 1st D.C. Infantry completed training in Chickamauga, Georgia. Harries then commanded the regiment in Cuba, including participation in the Siege of Santiago and the post-war Army of Occupation.

After the war, Harries resumed his service as commander of the D.C. National Guard with the rank of brigadier general. He was promoted to major general and remained in command until retiring in 1915. In 1912, Harries was elected to a term as the national commander of the Order of the Indian Wars of the United States.

=== World War I ===
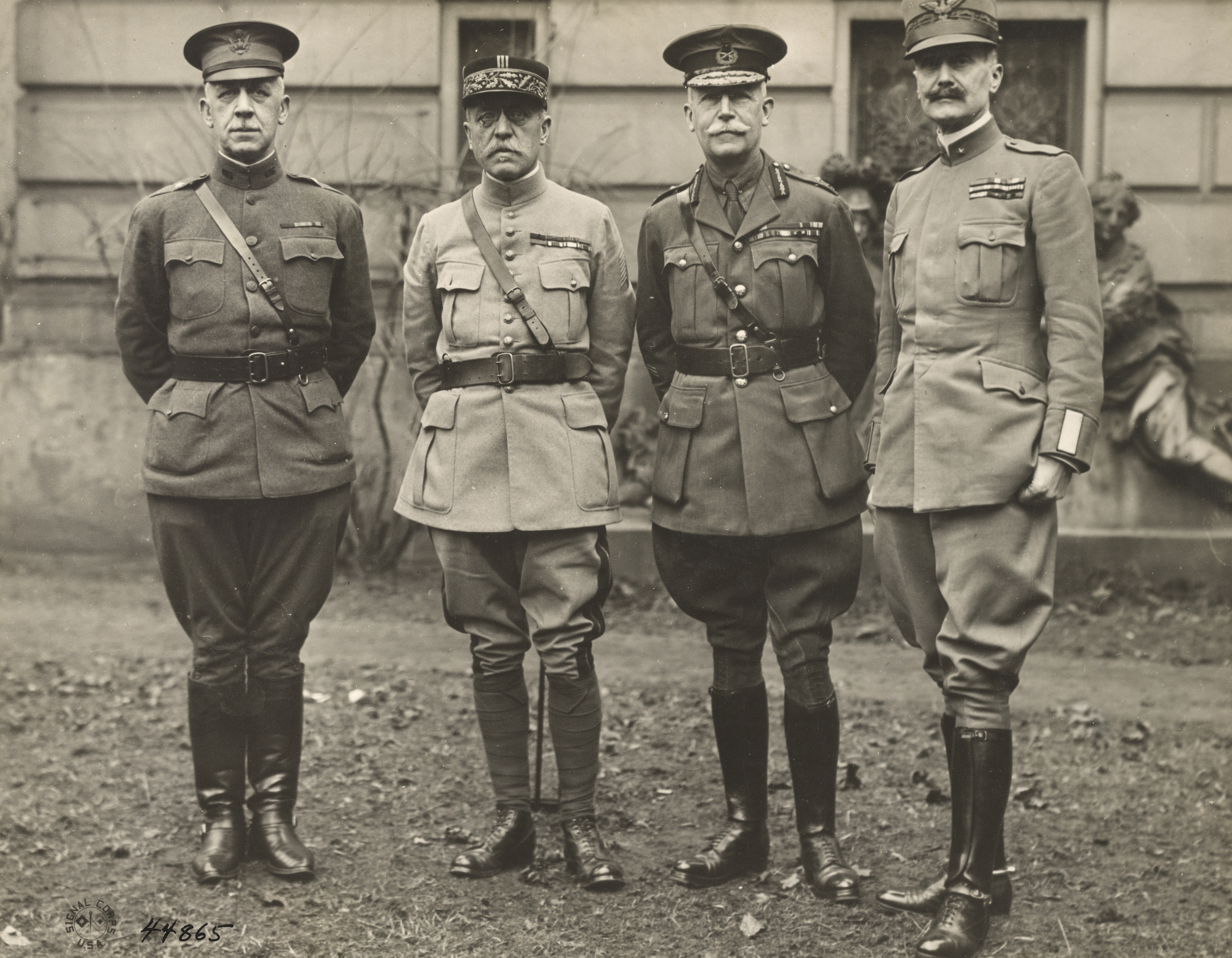
Harries (left) in 1919 with other members of the Allied commission that worked in Germany after World War I to repatriate Allied prisoners of war.

Harries was living in Omaha, Nebraska at the start of World War I. He returned to military service in June 1917 as commander of the Nebraska National Guard's 1st Brigade with the rank of brigadier general. He commanded several units in the United States and France during the war, including the 59th Depot Brigade, 186th Infantry Brigade, 173rd Infantry Brigade, and Base Section Number 5 in Brest, France.

Base Section Number 5 and the Port of Brest was the main point of debarkation for Allied troops and equipment arriving in France. After the war, it was the main Allied point of embarkation for Allies returning to the United States, England, and other countries. The commander of the American Expeditionary Forces (AEF) in Europe, General John J. Pershing, who had known Harries since the 1890s, selected Harries for this assignment based on his business experience, and Harries was commended by the U.S. and several foreign governments for his wartime leadership in constructing and operating the port.

Following the armistice of November 11, 1918, Harries took part in the occupation of Germany as Chief of the U.S. Military Mission in Berlin, which he led until December 1920. In this post, he was commended for his efforts to repatriate prisoners of war who had been captured by Germany. Harries' work on POW repatriation included interceding with the German government when it began forcing Russian POWs to return home, despite the fact that those who refused to pledge allegiance to the new communist government were subject to execution. After Harries demanded an end to the practice, the German government began taking steps to ensure the safety of Russians who had been held as POWs.

=== Post-World War I ===
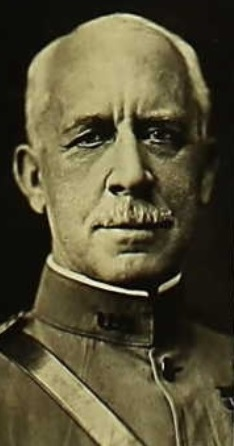
Photo of Harries from his October 1922 passport application

Following his return to the United States, Harries was commissioned as a brigadier general in the Organized Reserve Corps. After the war, Harries served on a board of general officers which reviewed the qualifications of the Army's majors, lieutenant colonels, and colonels to determine which would be retained in the service during its post-war personnel reductions. He was subsequently promoted to major general in the Auxiliary Officer Reserve Corps, and he served until reaching the mandatory retirement age of 64 in 1924.

Harries was elected commander of the Military Order of the World Wars in 1920, and served until 1925. He also served as a national vice president of the Society of the Army of Santiago de Cuba from 1924 to 1925 and president of the society's D.C. branch. The Byllesby company formed its own post-World War I American Legion post, of which Harries was elected commander.

== Awards ==
=== Military awards ===
Harries was a recipient of the Army Distinguished Service Medal, and the Navy Distinguished Service Medal. The citation for the former reads:

The President of the United States of America, authorized by Act of Congress, July 9, 1918, takes pleasure in presenting the Army Distinguished Service Medal to Brigadier General George H. Harries, United States Army, for exceptionally meritorious and distinguished services to the Government of the United States, in a duty of great responsibility during World War I. As Commanding General of Base Section No. 5, General Harries successfully directed the manifold activities at the Port of Brest during the time when troop arrivals were at their maximum. He overcame seemingly insurmountable obstacles in coordinating and organizing his important task. Subsequently, upon being sent on a special mission to Berlin in connection with the repatriation of allied prisoners of war, he displayed commendable tact and energy.

In addition, he was a recipient of the French Legion of Honor (Commander), Russia's Order of Saint Stanislaus, Serbia's Order of the White Eagle (Commander), Italy's Order of Saints Maurice and Lazarus (Commander), Greece's Order of George I (Grand Cross), and Montenegro's Order of Prince Danilo I (Grand Commander). In 1921, Harries received Belgium's Order of Leopold II (Commander).

=== Civilian awards ===
Harries was a historian and lectured on U.S. colonial history at several colleges and universities. His presentations were recognized with the honorary degrees of Master of Arts from Howard University in 1897 and LL.D. from the University of Kentucky in 1914.

== Retirement and death ==
Harries served as president of the Illuminating Engineering Society from 1920 to 1921. In retirement, Harries was a fellow of the American Institute of Electrical Engineers and resided in Bel Air, Los Angeles, California. He became ill while visiting Washington, D.C., in September 1934, and was hospitalized for several weeks. Harries died of pneumonia in Waverly, Maryland on September 29, 1934. He was buried at Arlington National Cemetery.

== Family ==
On April 23, 1883, Harries married Elizabeth Langley (d. 1925). On January 11, 1927, he married Alice Loveland. Harries and his first wife were the parents of two sons, Lieutenant Colonel Herbert Langley Harries and First Lieutenant Warren Godwin Harries. Warren Harries died in a car accident in France while he was serving as his father's aide de camp during World War I.
