= Joker Stairs =

Filming location in New York City

Coordinates: 40.8359°N 73.9239°W

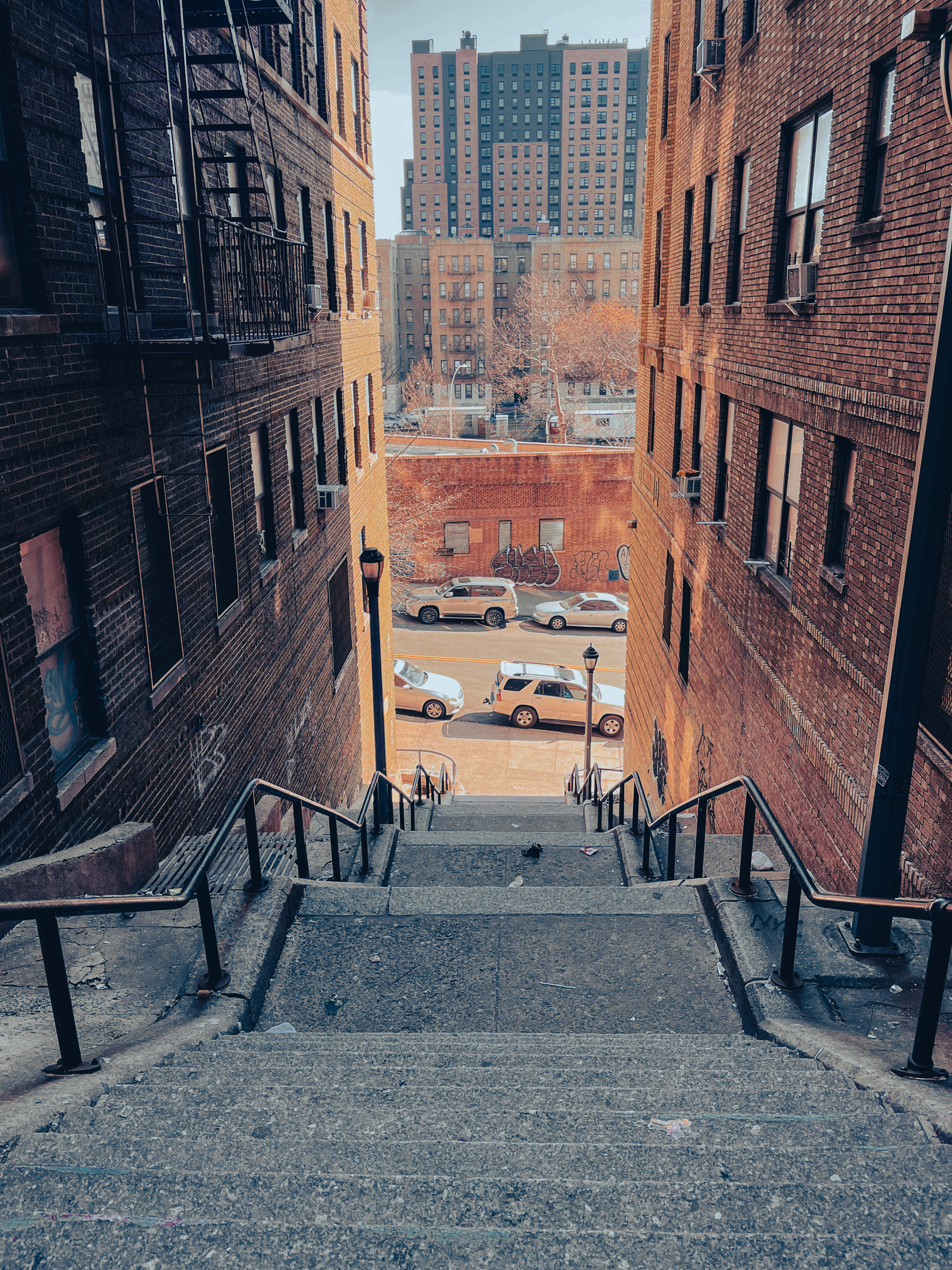
West 167th Street Stairs, also known as the "Joker Stairs"

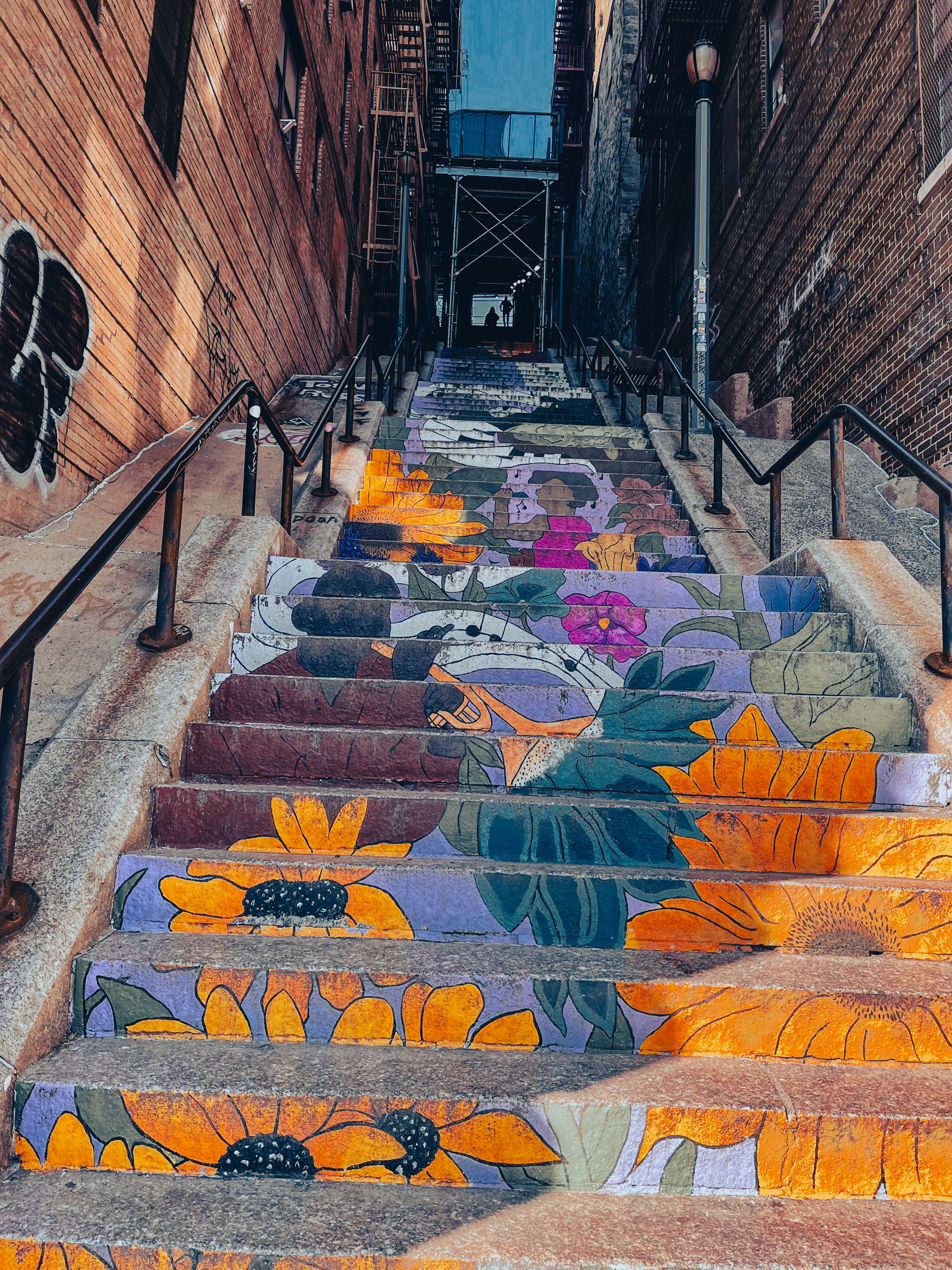
The stairs in early February 2024

The West 167th Street Stairs, colloquially known as the Joker Stairs and also as the Shakespeare Steps, are a step street connecting Shakespeare and Anderson avenues at West 167th Street in the Highbridge neighborhood of the Bronx in New York City. Located near the 167th Street station on the New York City Subway's 4 train, the stairs served as one of the filming locations for the 2019 film Joker, as well as its 2024 sequel Joker: Folie à Deux.

In the film, the character Arthur Fleck, the Joker (played by Joaquin Phoenix), is repeatedly shown walking up and down the stairs as part of his daily routine. Later, toward the film's climax, he dances down the stairs, wearing a brightly-colored suit and clown makeup, which represent a change in his character, as the Gary Glitter song "Rock and Roll Part 2" plays in the background. The stairs appear in a promotional poster for the film and have become a tourist destination; both the stairs and Phoenix's dance have inspired Internet memes.

Many visitors have re-enacted the scene from the film, sometimes in Joker attire, to the point that the stairs have become crowded with sightseers. Bronx residents have complained that tourists cause crowding during their commutes while snapping pictures and wielding selfie sticks. Alexandria Ocasio-Cortez, U.S. representative for New York's 14th congressional district (which covers portions of the Bronx), asked visitors to stay away from the Joker Stairs to avoid causing problems for residents.

India Today notes, "Even though the stairs have been around for years and lead to some of the most famous spots in New York [...] they were never really popular because of their association with crime in the area." The New York Times notes that stairs used in the 2007 biographical crime film American Gangster, located in a South Bronx neighborhood, were originally to be used in the Joker scenes, but had been repaved and beautified too much to be aesthetically acceptable for the film.

NBC New York notes that the Joker Stairs have joined "the ranks of well-known movie settings, like that of the steps at the Philadelphia Museum of Art" seen in the 1976 American sports drama Rocky. In 2019, Burger King released a promotional video featuring the Joker Stairs, with a title card saying "We know clowns can be annoying", innuendo directed at McDonald's mascot, Ronald McDonald.

== See also ==
- Potemkin Stairs
- Exorcist steps
- The Music Box Steps
