= John B. Long =

American politician

John Benjamin Long
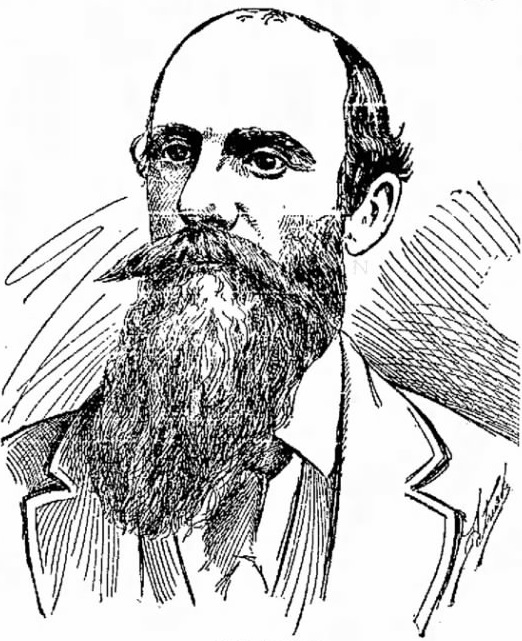

Member of the Texas House of Representatives
- In office 1913–1914

Member of the U.S. House of Representatives from Texas's 2nd district
- In office March 4, 1891 – March 3, 1893
- Preceded by: William H. Martin
- Succeeded by: Samuel B. Cooper

Personal details
- Born: John Benjamin Long; September 8, 1843 Douglass, Texas
- Died: April 27, 1924 (aged 80) Rusk, Texas
- Party: Democratic
- Spouse: Emma Wiggins

John Benjamin Long (September 8, 1843 – April 27, 1924) was a newspaper publisher, college president and a member of the United States House of Representatives from Texas.

Born in Douglass, Texas, Long moved with his parents to Rusk, Texas, in 1846. He was educated in private schools, and, although he studied law and was admitted to state bar, he never practiced law. Instead, he took over the family cotton business in Rusk.

He enlisted in the Confederate States Army at the age of seventeen and served throughout the war in Company C, Third Texas Cavalry. This cavalry unit became part of the "Ross Brigade" under the command of Brig. General Lawrence Sullivan "Sul" Ross who was later Governor of Texas. Following the end of the war, he returned to Rusk, TX and married Emma Wiggins.

In 1886 Long purchased the Standard Herald newspaper in Rusk and served as editor until 1905. As the candidate of Democratic Party, he was elected in 1890 to the Fifty-second Congress of the United States, serving from March 4, 1891 – March 3, 1893. He was an unsuccessful candidate for re-nomination in 1892. In 1895, he became president of The Agricultural and Mechanical College of Texas, later Texas A&M University. He served as a member of the Texas House of Representatives from Cherokee County (Rusk) in the session of 1913-1914.

He died in Rusk, TX on April 27, 1924, and was buried in Cedar Hill Cemetery in Rusk.

== Sources ==
- United States Congress. "John B. Long (id: L000422)". Biographical Directory of the United States Congress.

Texas State Archives.

U.S. House of Representatives
Preceded by William H. Martin	Member of the U.S. House of Representatives from Texas's 2nd congressional district 1891-1893	Succeeded by Samuel B. Cooper
