= Georgetown Car Barn =

Historic streetcar terminal in Washington, D.C.

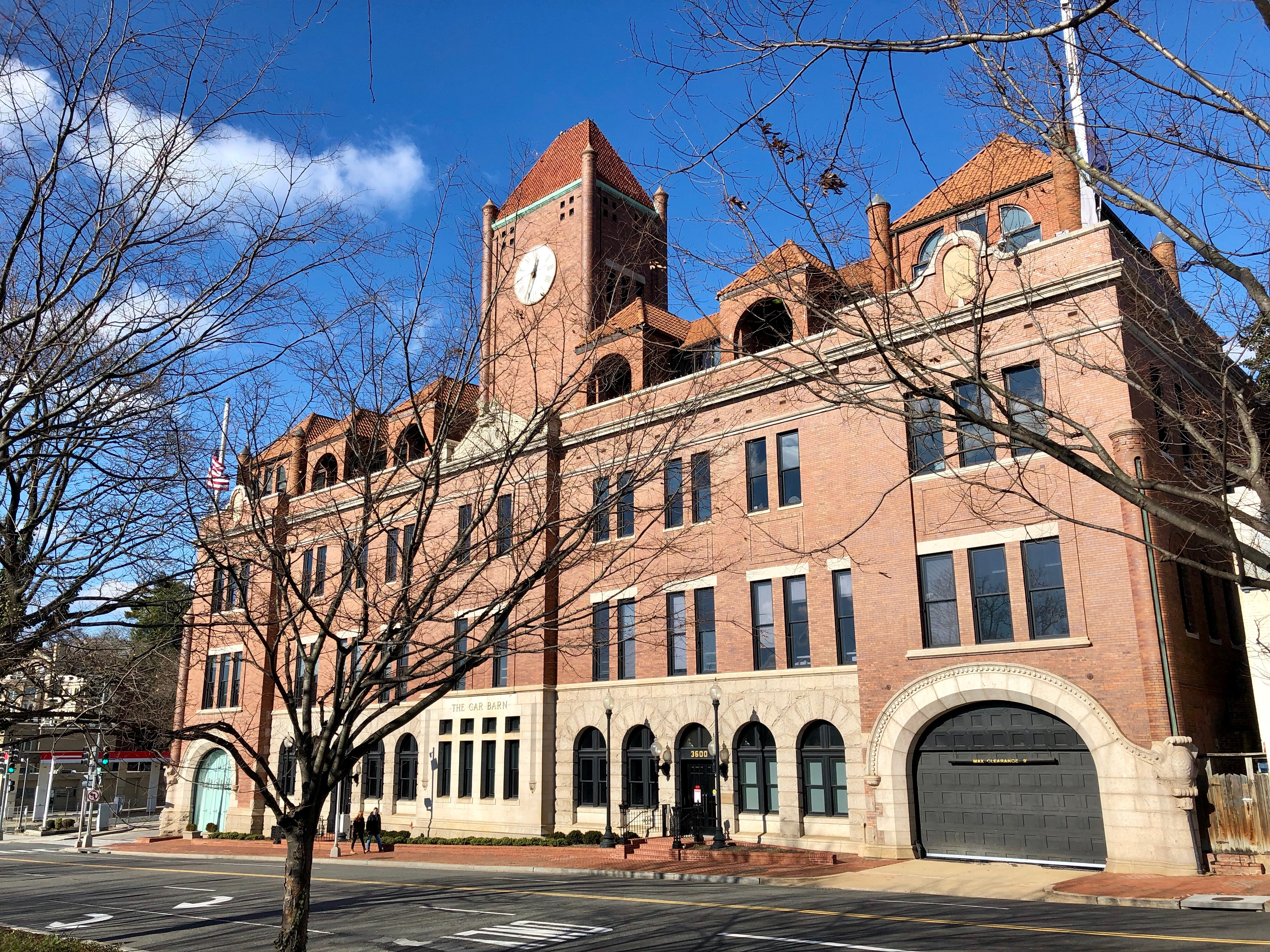
- M Street elevation in December 2018
- Former names: Union Station

General information
- Architectural style: Romanesque Revival
- Location: Georgetown, Washington, D.C., United States, 3600 M Street, N.W.
- Coordinates: 38°54′19″N 77°4′12″W
- Construction started: 1895
- Opened: May 27, 1897
- Owner: Georgetown University

Height
- Architectural: 140 feet (43 m)

Technical details
- Floor count: 4
- Floor area: 81,765 square feet (7,596 m^{2})

Design and construction
- Architect: Waddy Butler Wood
- Civil engineer: D.S. Carll
- Capital Traction Company Union Station
- U.S. National Register of Historic Places
- U.S. National Historic Landmark District – Contributing property
- D.C. Inventory of Historic Sites
- Part of: Georgetown Historic District (ID67000025)
- MPS: Streetcar and Bus Resources of Washington, DC MPS
- NRHP reference No.: 100004248

Significant dates
- Added to NRHP: August 9, 2019
- Designated NHLDCP: May 28, 1967
- Designated DCIHS: January 24, 2019

The Georgetown Car Barn, historically known as the Capital Traction Company Union Station, is a building in the Georgetown neighborhood of Washington, D.C., in the United States. Designed by the architect Waddy Butler Wood, it was built between 1895 and 1897 by the Capital Traction Company as a union terminal for several Washington and Virginia streetcar lines. The adjacent Exorcist steps, later named after their appearance in William Friedkin's 1973 horror film The Exorcist, were built during the initial construction to connect M Street with Prospect Street.

The Car Barn, built for use as a passenger station and to store streetcars, was also the terminal for Washington's only cable car system. Almost immediately after the building opened, Capital Traction converted its streetcar lines to electrical power and modified the Car Barn to suit. Still, the building was never used to the extent anticipated by its builders.

The building has undergone several renovations. The most extensive, in 1911, modified the original Romanesque Revival façade and almost completely gutted the interior. Changing ownership over time, it maintained its original function of housing streetcars until 1950, when it was redeveloped as office space. Among its occupants was the International Police Academy, an arm of the Central Intelligence Agency, which operated out of the Car Barn in the 1960s and 1970s. Today, it is an academic building owned by Georgetown University. In 2019, it was listed on the National Register of Historic Places.

== History ==
=== Early history ===
In 1761, a tobacco warehouse was constructed at the Car Barn's site. During the Civil War, the site became home to some of the city's horse-drawn streetcars. On August 23, 1894, after the city's streetcars had begun to switch to electric power, Congress authorized an extension of the Washington and Georgetown Railroad to the intersection of 36th and M Streets, directly north of the north end of the Aqueduct Bridge. The legislation required that the railroad erect at the site a union passenger station in order to accommodate the street railway traffic expected to converge at or near the bridge. The legislation limited the station's use to street railways only.

=== Construction and design ===
Construction on the building then known as Union Station began in early 1895 under the architectural direction of Waddy Butler Wood. The superintendent and chief engineer of the Capital Traction Company, D.S. Carll, was in charge of the construction. Before the Car Barn's construction began, a steep hillside that 36th Street climbed stood between M and Prospect Streets. Large amounts of earth were excavated—80,000 cubic yards (61,000 m^{3}) in total—resulting in the sharp cliff that exists today. Adjacent to the Car Barn are a set of stairs commonly known as the "Exorcist steps" and a large retaining wall, which were built at the time the Car Barn was constructed, to connect M and Prospect Streets. The steps are so named as they provided the location for the scene in the 1973 horror film The Exorcist where the priest is thrown down the stairs to his death.

The next-door resident of the Prospect House, who furnished affidavits by prominent architects, opposed the building's construction by stating that blasting from the construction was damaging her house. This led to court-ordered supervision of the blasting in 1894. After the Car Barn's construction, the large edifice obstructed the view of the Potomac River and Virginia from homes on Prospect Street, including the well-known cottage of E. D. E. N. Southworth. (Note: The Southworth home was known as the Prospect Cottage and became a tourist attraction after E. D. E. N. Southworth's death. It was demolished in 1942, and The Exorcist House was built in its place.) For this reason, some considered it a "desecration" of the local scenery.

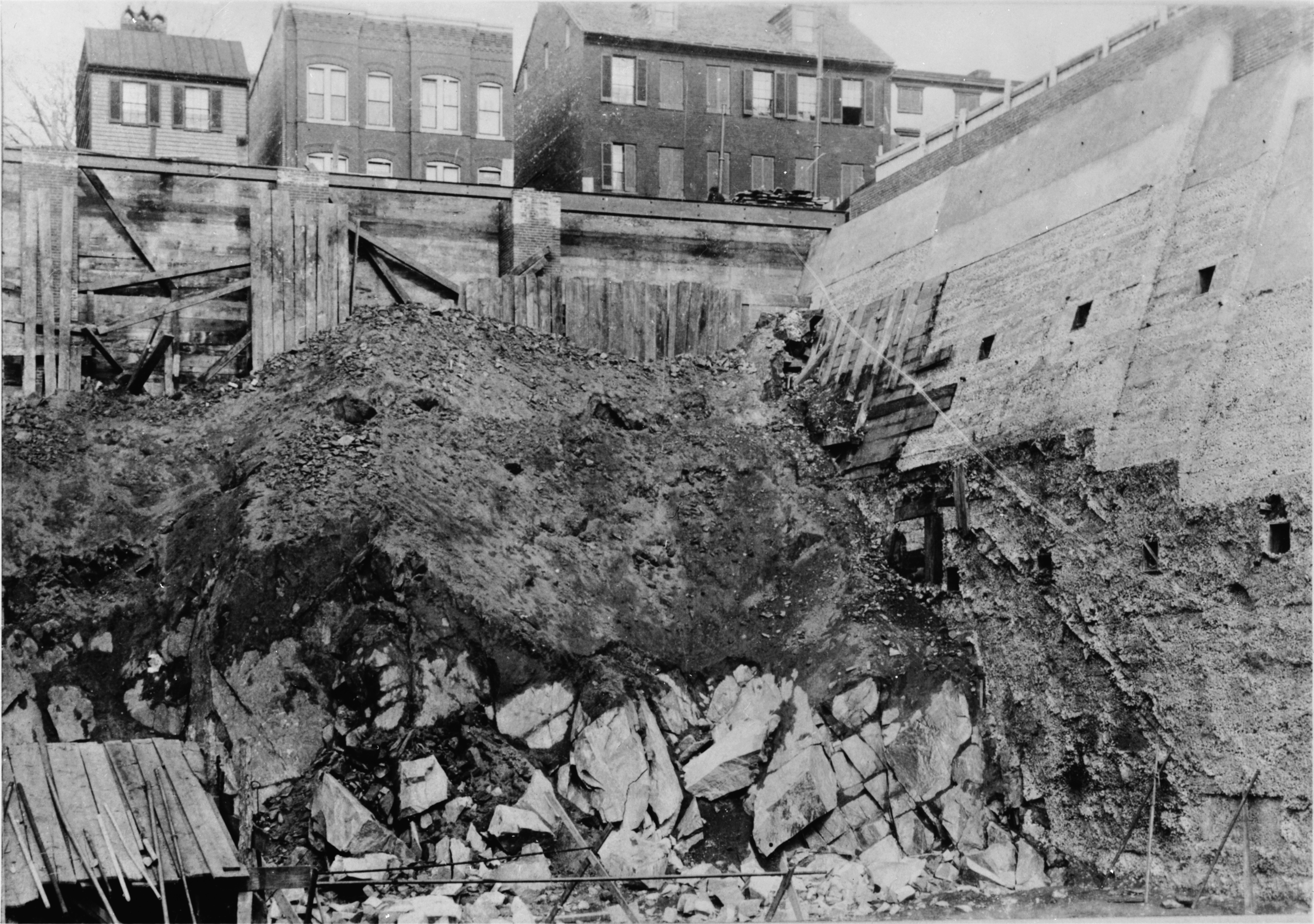
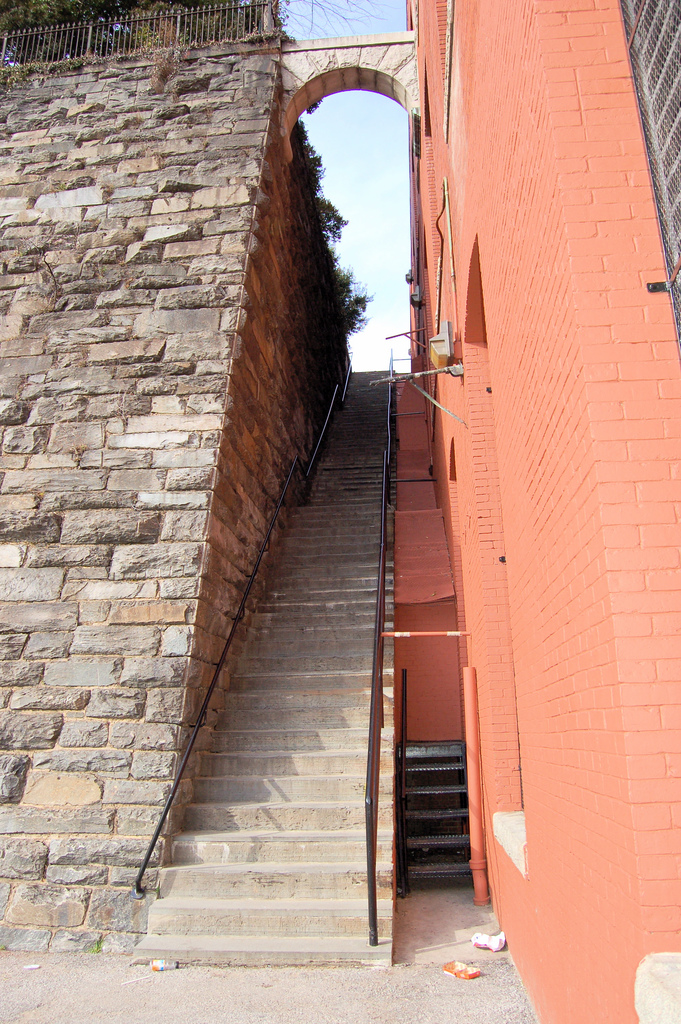
Significant excavation during construction led to the creation of the "Exorcist steps".

The three-story, 180-by-242-foot (55 by 74 m) building was opened on May 27, 1897, containing offices for the several tenant trolley companies and waiting rooms that were decorated with red oak wainscot panelling, ornate iron stair railings, and stuccoed ceilings. The exterior was designed in the Romanesque Revival style. The building's tower reached a height of 140 feet (43 m) and contained an elevator that shuttled passengers between the terminals. Many of the building's decorations reflect its original function, including the pediment that faces M Street. The pediment, which contains the words "Capital Traction Company", displays three decorative flywheels of the type that pull cables.

The M Street-facing first floor served the Washington and Georgetown Railroad. The Metropolitan Railroad used the roof, which had a covered walkway for passengers to travel between the street and the elevator. Because of the lay of the land in the building's vicinity, other streetcars, including those serving the city's suburbs, would reach the building's second and third floors from steel trestles.

Capital Traction expected trolleys to cross the Potomac River from Rosslyn on the nearby Aqueduct Bridge. At the time, those trolleys were traveling or would soon travel between downtown Washington, Arlington County (then named Alexandria County), Falls Church and the City of Alexandria. Other trolleys were later expected to enter the building after traveling along the projected route of the Great Falls and Old Dominion Railroad. The station operated as Washington's only cable car trolley terminal for less than a year. Almost immediately after the building opened, Capital Traction converted it to enable the company to operate the new electric streetcars. The Virginia lines never made use of the terminal. The Metropolitan Railroad originally intended to place storage tracks on the roof of the building, but never did.

== Extensive re-design ==
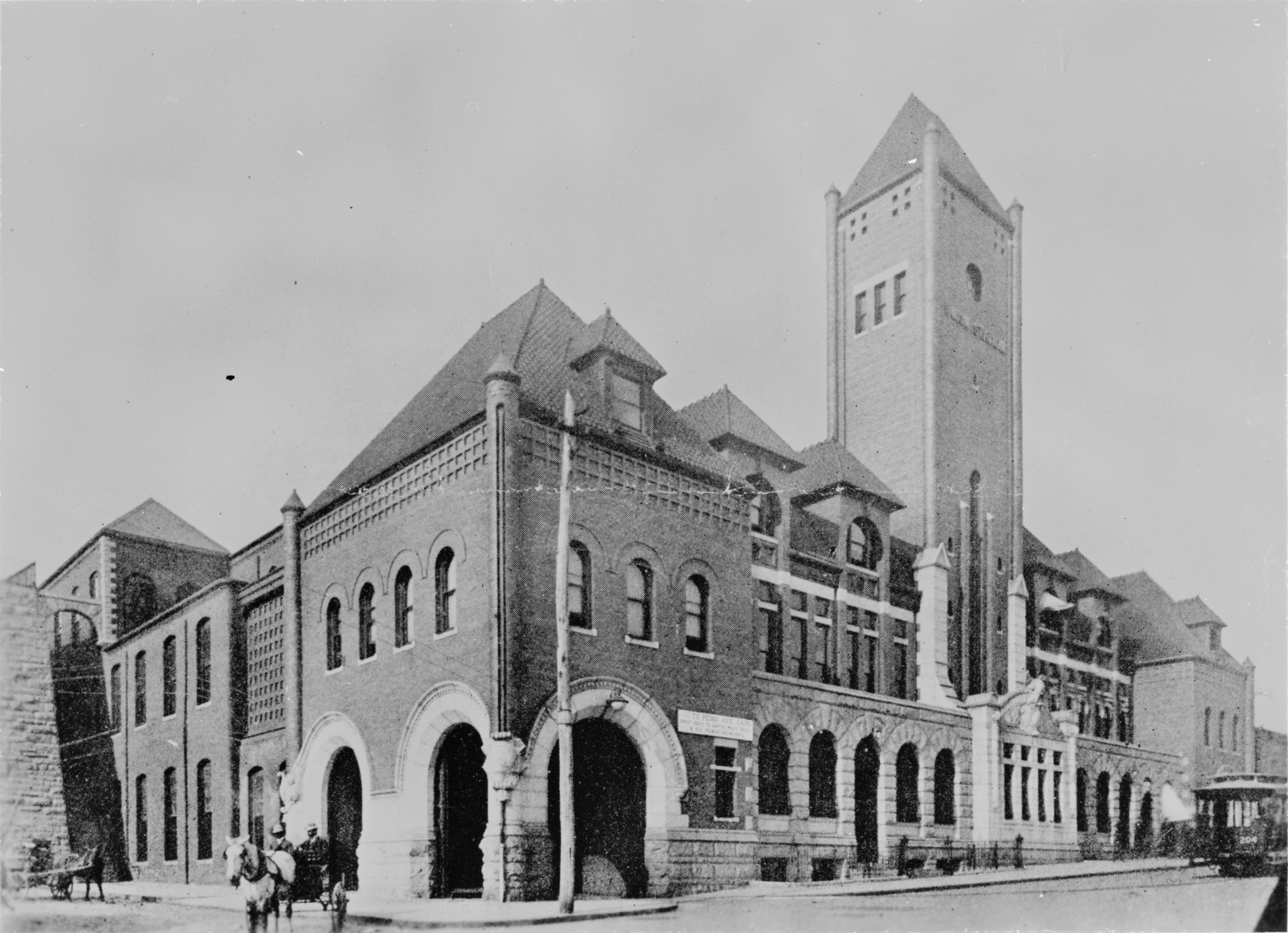
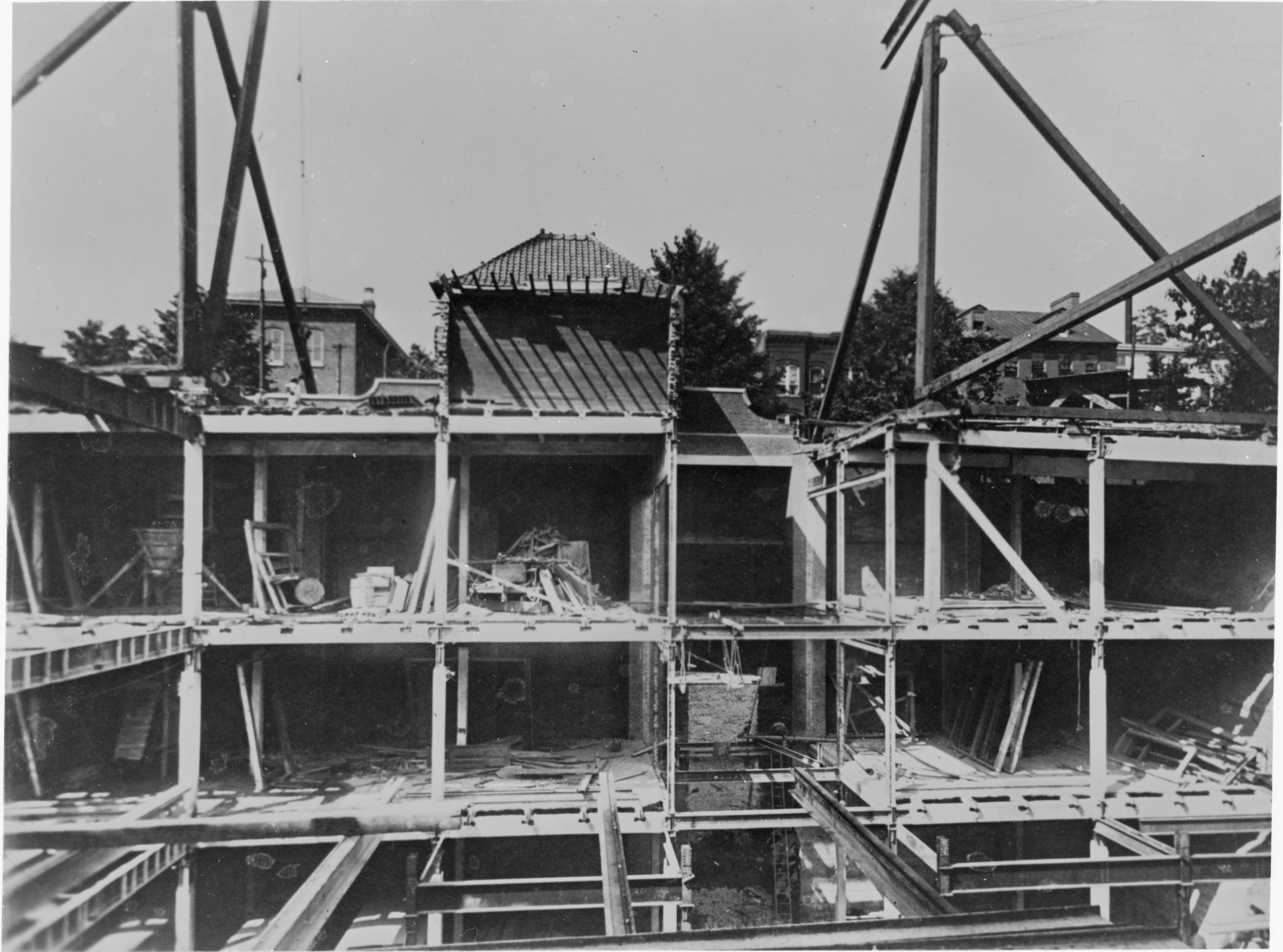
The original façade (left) and interior (right) were extensively modified in 1911.

Although regarded as well-designed before 1900, the Car Barn began a period of deterioration and neglect lasting for 50 years. The first stage of the transition from a trolley station to an office building was carried out between 1906 and 1908 when portions of the second floor were converted into office space. The electrification of streetcars necessitated a large-scale re-design of the Barn, which began in 1910. The entrances to the building were extended to accommodate the larger cars, and a new elevator was installed to lift streetcars to the roof. This transition required a near-complete reconstruction of the building.

The steel support beams were replaced, and the hipped roofs were replaced so the entire façade could be extended toward M Street and heightened to allow more office space. The central tower, which once rose prominently above the building's lower roofline on M street, became less prominent. These modifications were complete in 1911.

Further conversions of track space to office space occurred between 1921 and 1922. Extensive remodeling occurred again in 1933 with the designation of the Car Barn as the headquarters of the new Capital Transit Company, as a result of the merger between the Capital Traction Company and the Washington Railway and Electric Company, which increased the number of office workers at the building. These changes involved removing the roof in the center of the building, creating a lightwell on the third floor, converting the third floor into office space, and removing the covered passageway on the roof.

== Post-streetcar era ==
The last streetcar operations at the Car Barn ended with the closure of the Rosslyn–Benning Line on April 30, 1949. The building continued to store streetcars until May 1950. Toward the end of 1952, the first floor was converted into office space.

When the Capital Transit Company merged with its competitors, the building came under the ownership of its new corporate successor, the DC Transit System, in 1956. By then, the building had fallen into such a state of disrepair that the company deliberated over whether to demolish it entirely. Seeking to preserve the historic structure, it elected to redevelop it. The building underwent considerable interior renovations between 1957 and 1960, intended to turn the structure entirely into an office building. Sometime before 1966, a clock was added to the exterior of the tower. This involved lowering the ceilings, which were previously designed to accommodate the height of the streetcars. The building was included in the Historic American Buildings Survey in 1967.

Beginning in late 1963, the Car Barn was home to the International Police Academy, operated by the Central Intelligence Agency (though officially part of the Agency for International Development) that trained Latin American police forces. Members of these forces met at the Car Barn until the program was shut down in 1975. In 1986, the building underwent renovations, overseen by Arthur Cotton Moore/Associates. In 1992, the owner of the DC Transit System, O. Roy Chalk, was subject to foreclosure, and the building came under the ownership of the Lutheran Brotherhood. The Car Barn was purchased in 1997 by Douglas Development Corporation and it was renovated the following year. RTKL Associates oversaw additional renovations in 1999.

Georgetown University began leasing space in the Car Barn in the 1950s. The university initially used the building's first floor as garage space. In 2017, the university completed a renovation of the building's first floor to provide space for the Graduate School of Arts and Sciences and the Georgetown University Press. A new lounge located in the southwest corner of the building featured floor-to-ceiling glass windows that increased window space by partly or completely replacing garage doors. The project also renovated the floor's more easterly M Street windows and entry doors. In 2022, Georgetown University purchased the Car Barn for $70 million.

The building today has four floors and has a floor area of 81,765 square feet (7,596 m^{2}). Remnants of streetcar tracks and their central electrical conduit remain visible outside of the garage's east door on M Street.

== Historic designations ==
The Car Barn is considered a contributing property of the Georgetown Historic District, which was listed on the National Register of Historic Places on May 28, 1967.

On January 24, 2019, the Car Barn was listed on the District of Columbia Inventory of Historic Sites. In recommending that the District of Columbia Historic Preservation Review Board designate a historic landmark on the Car Barn as a D.C. Inventory of Historic Sites, the D.C. Historic Preservation Office described the Car Barn as "the most significant extant example of a terminal or depot" in Washington, D.C.

The National Park Service added the building to the National Register of Historic Places as part of a multiple property submission named "Streetcar and Bus Resources of Washington, DC" on August 9, 2019.

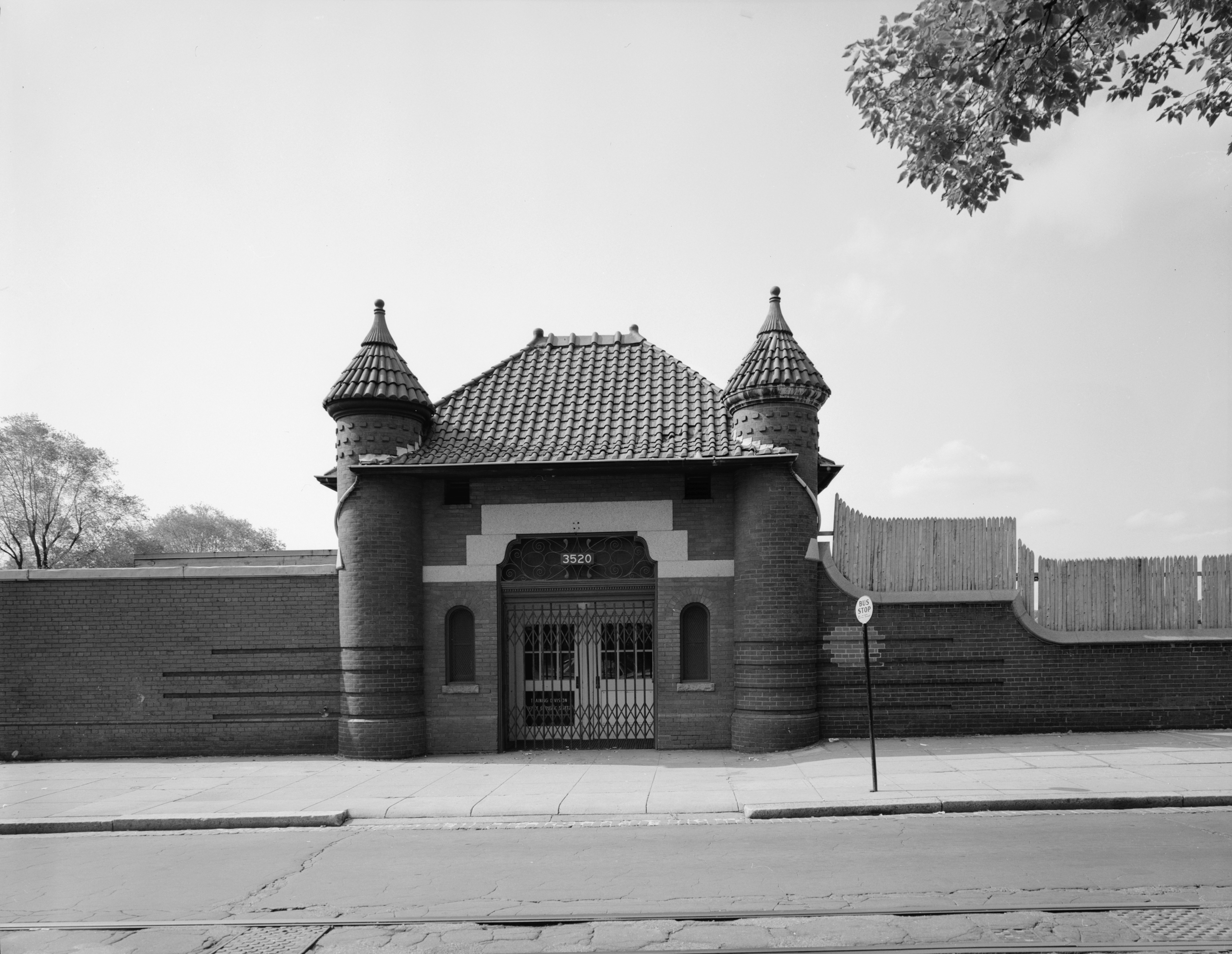
Prospect Street entrance in 1966

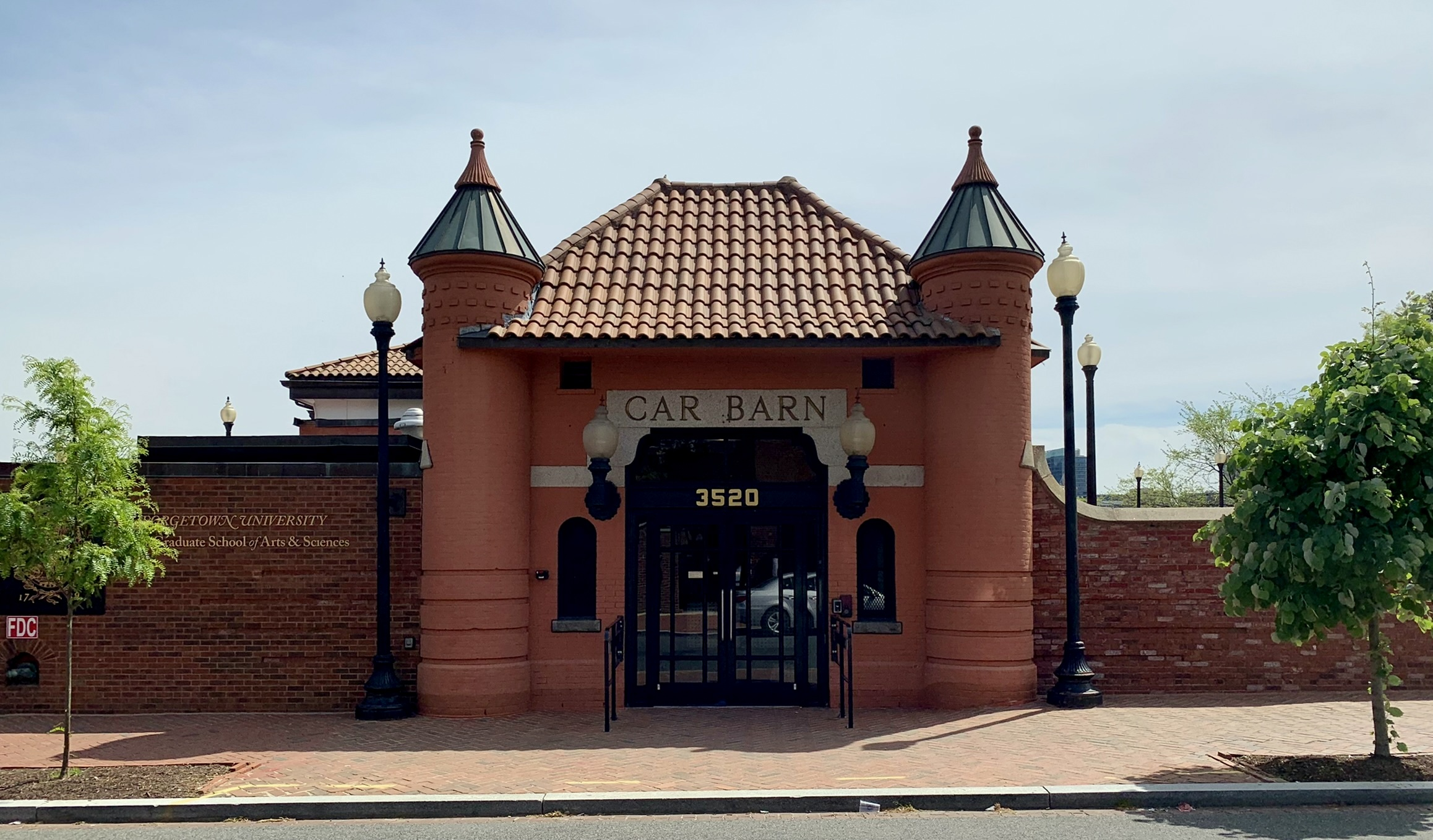
Prospect Street entrance in 2022

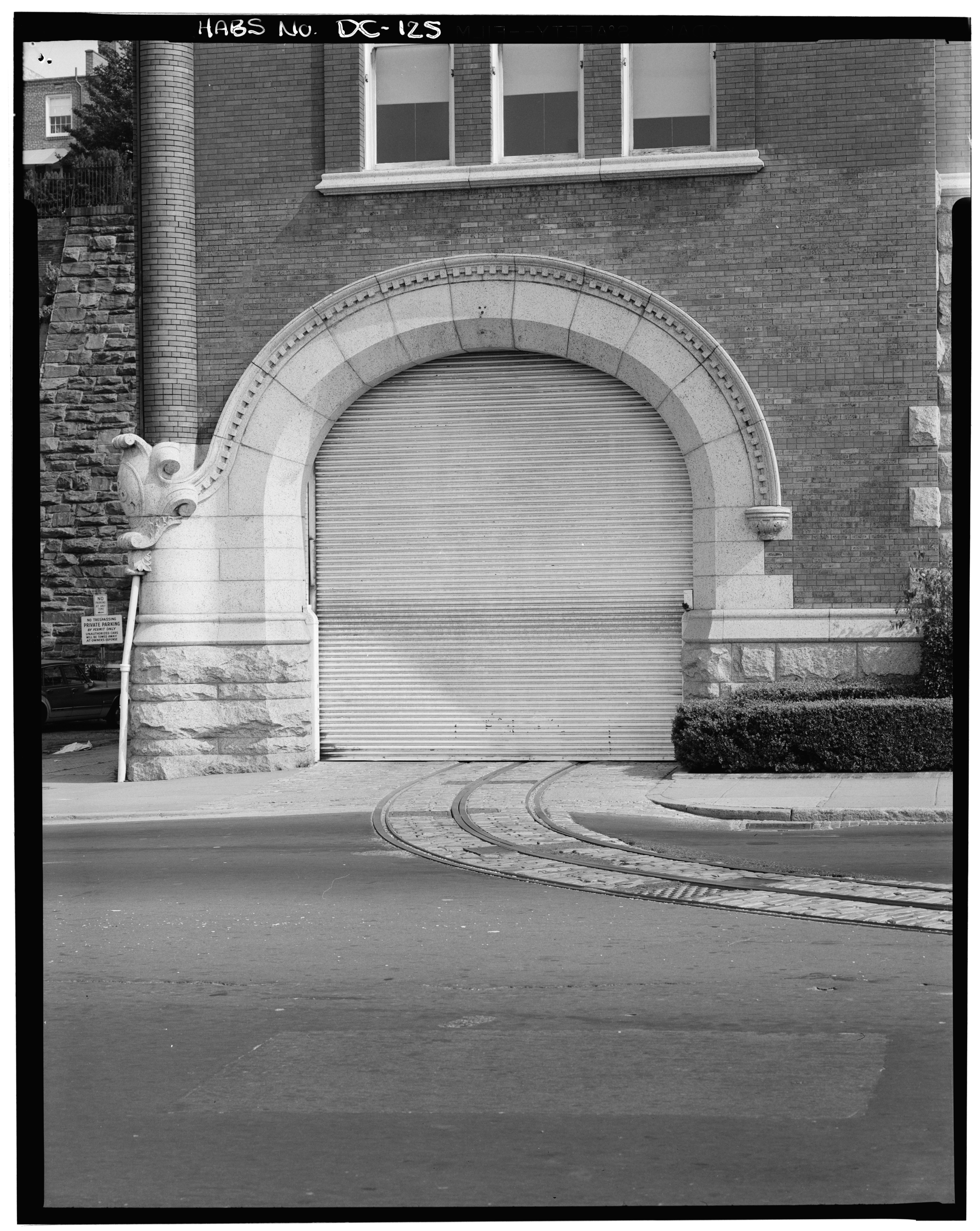
Streetcar tracks and conduit outside the garage's west door (1966)

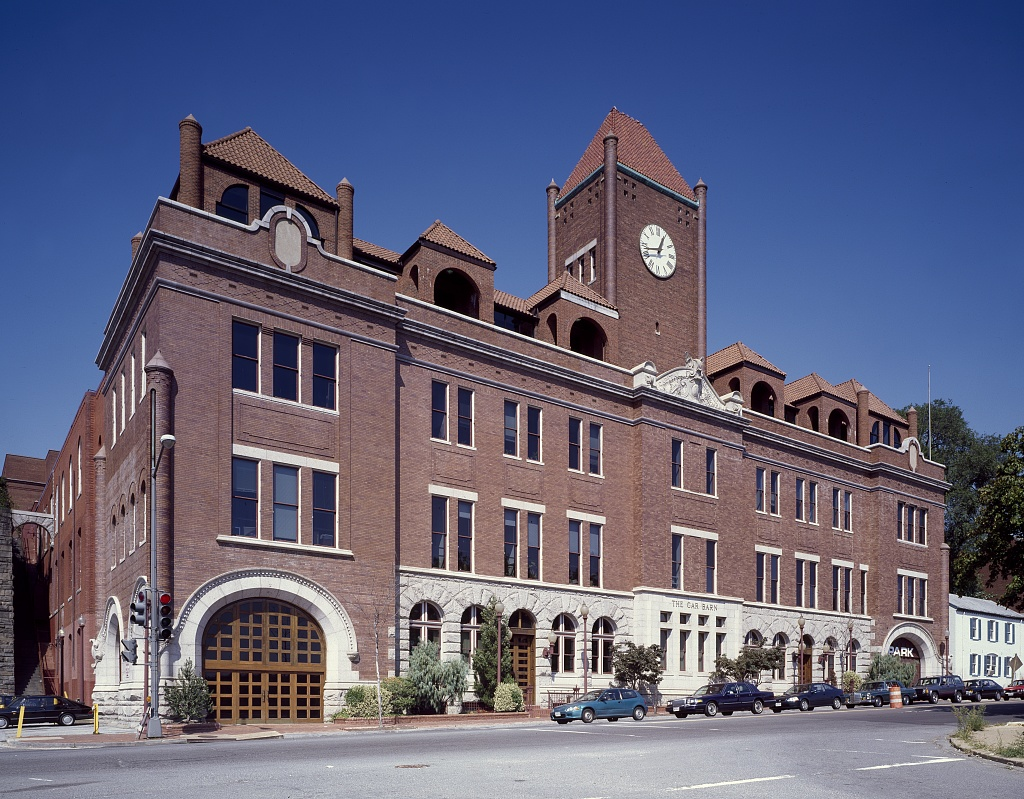
View of Car Barn from the southwest between 1980 and 2006

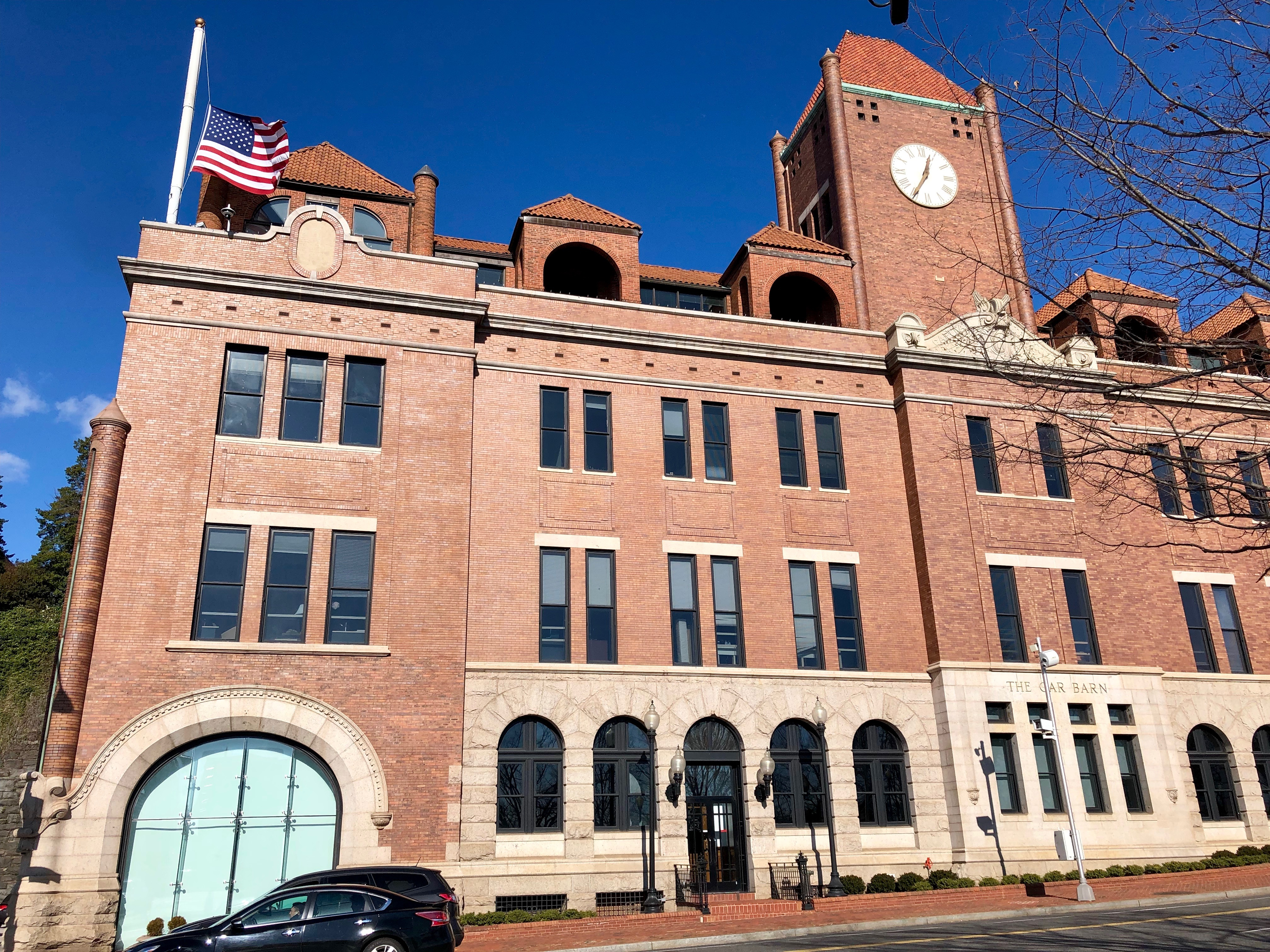
Renovations had replaced the garage's westernmost M Street door with architectural glazing by December 2018.

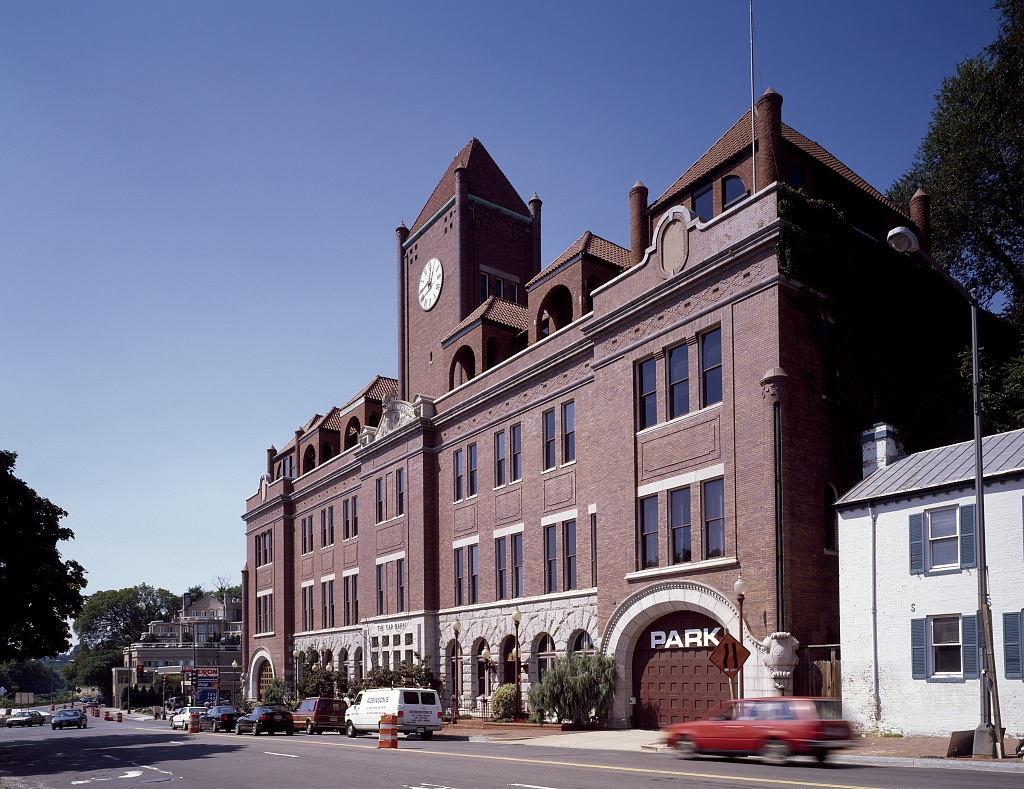
View of Car Barn from the southeast between 1980 and 2006

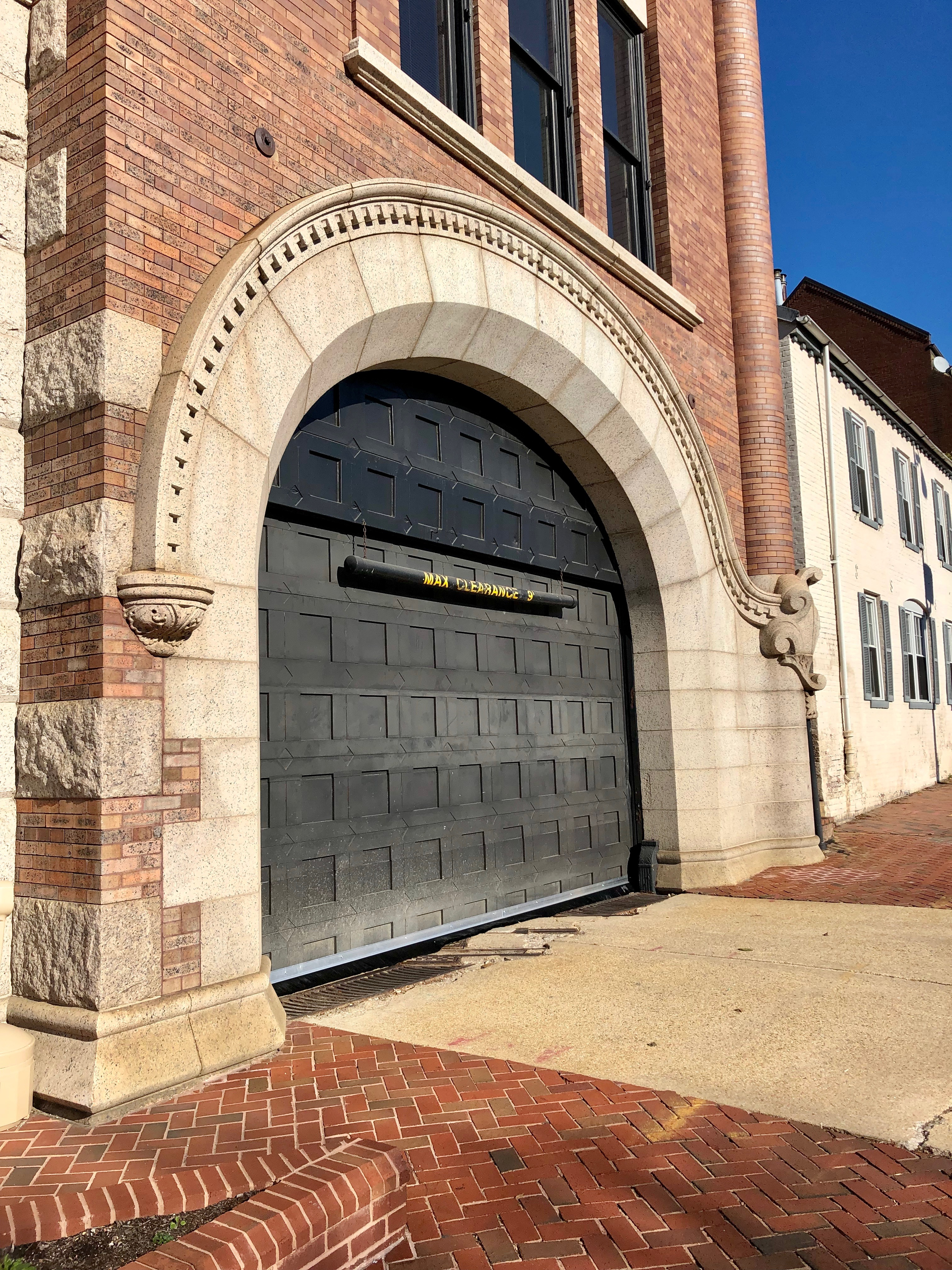
Renovations had replaced the garage's east door with a new door by December 2018.

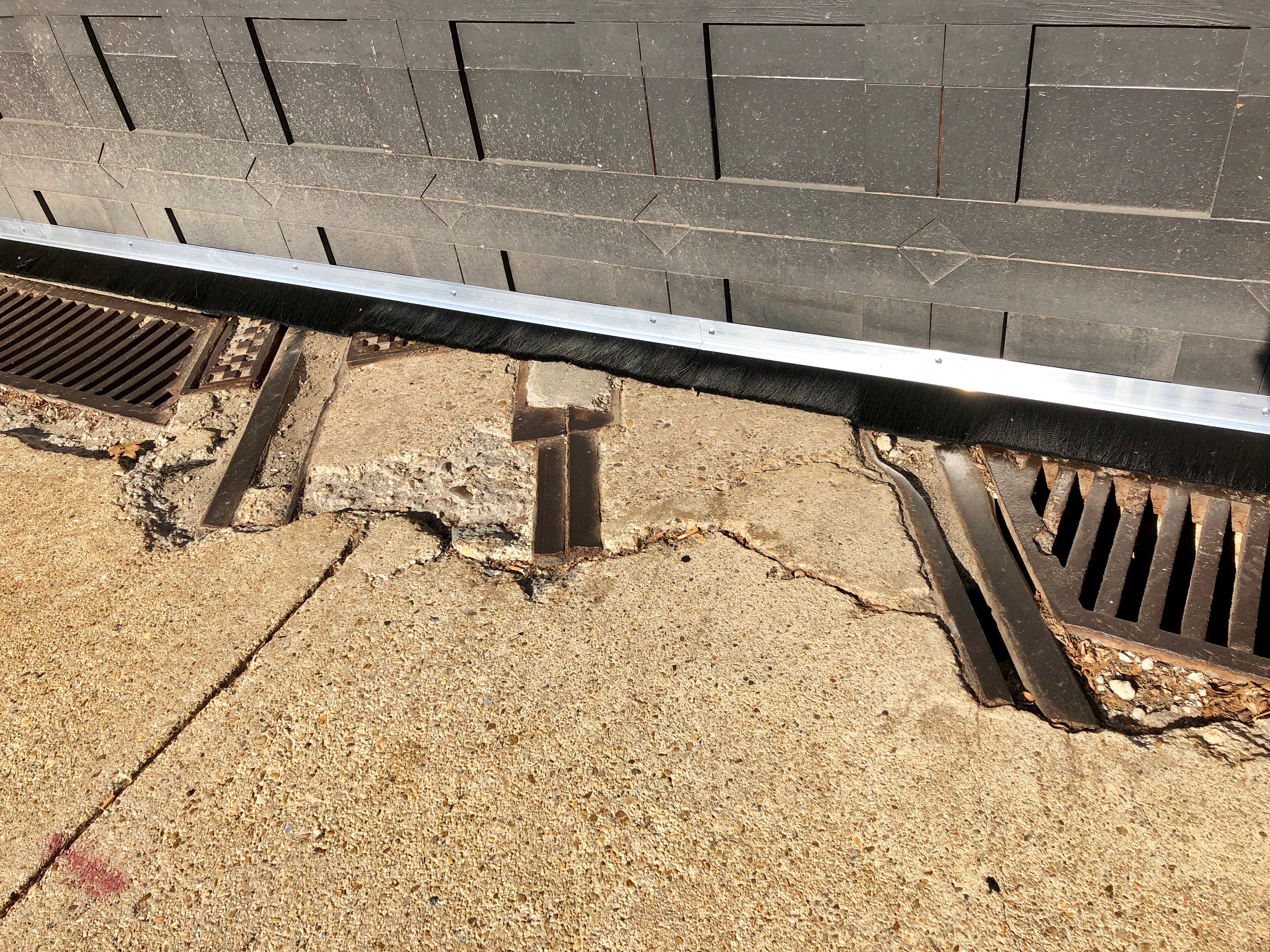
Streetcar tracks and conduit outside the garage's new east door (December 2018)
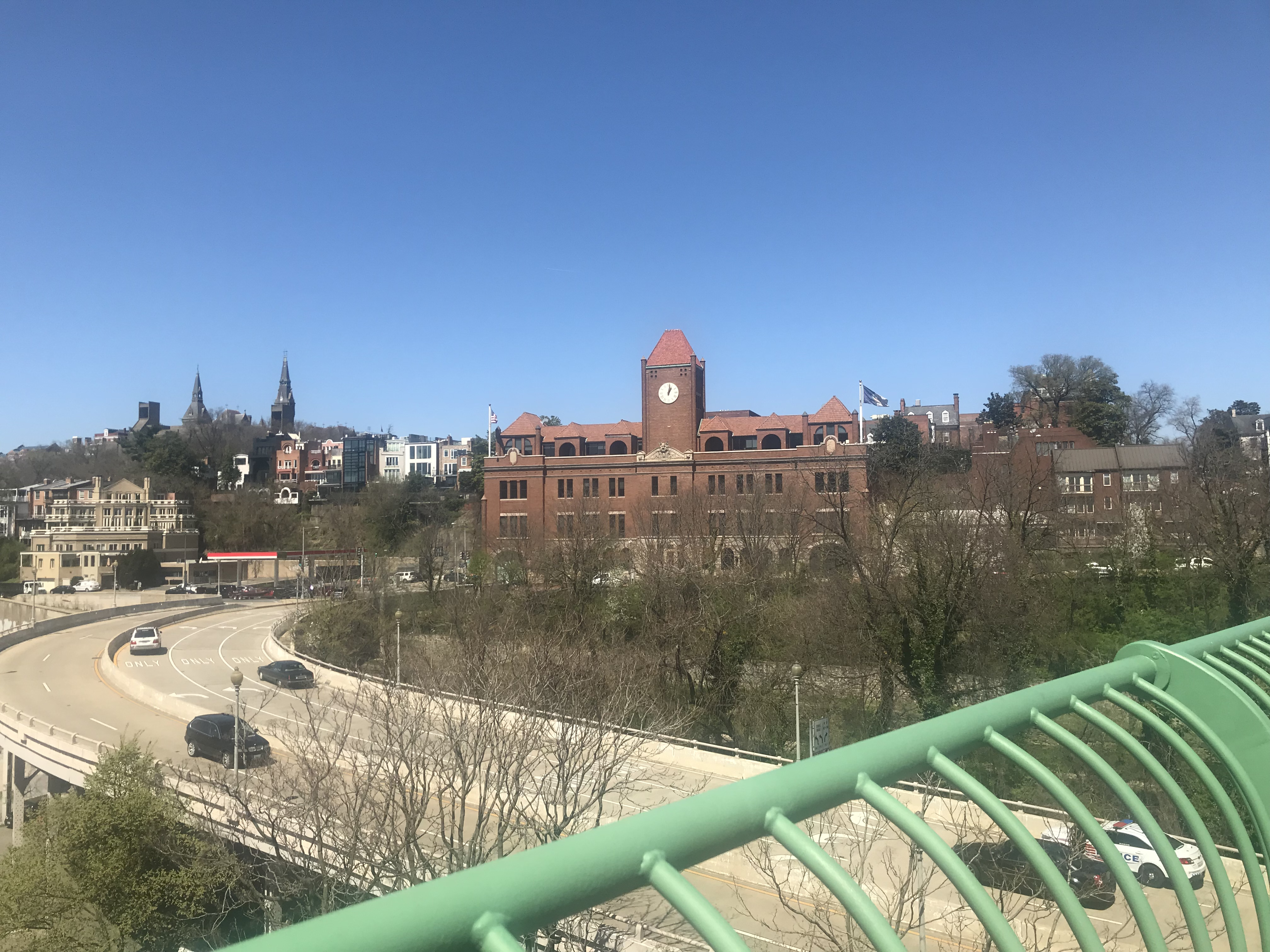
The Car Barn seen from the nearby Key Bridge in April 2019. The towers of Georgetown University's Healy Hall (left) rise behind the Barn. The Whitehurst Freeway is in the foreground.

== See also ==
- Wychwood Barns, a former streetcar barn and maintenance facility in Toronto converted into a community space
