= William Harrison Martin =

American politician (1822–1898)

William Harrison "Howdy" Martin
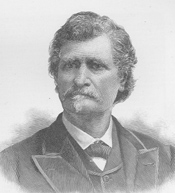

Member of the U.S. House of Representatives from Texas's 2nd district
- In office November 4, 1887 – March 3, 1891
- Preceded by: John Henninger Reagan
- Succeeded by: John Benjamin Long

District Attorney Kaufman, Smith Henderson, Anderson counties
- In office unknown dates – (between Congress and State Senate)

Senator Texas Senate, District 22
- In office 1853–1858
- Preceded by: John O. Meusebach
- Succeeded by: Francis Marion Martin

Personal details
- Born: September 2, 1822 Twiggs County, Georgia, US
- Died: February 5, 1898 (aged 75) Hill County, Texas, US
- Resting place: Hillsboro Cemetery
- Party: Democratic
- Spouse: Martha Elizabeth Gallemore
- Children: Six children
- Education: Troy State College
- Profession: Attorney

Military service
- Allegiance: Confederate States Army
- Branch/service: Hood's Texas Brigade
- Battles/wars: Eastern Theater of the American Civil War

William Harrison "Howdy" Martin (September 2, 1822 – February 5, 1898) was a Texas State Senator, U.S. Representative from Texas and veteran of the Confederate States Army who served under Robert E. Lee.

== Biography ==
William Harrison Martin was born^{(see talk page)} to Robert and Charlotte Martin, in Twiggs County, Georgia on September 2, 1822. He married Martha Elizabeth Gallemore on February 12, 1867, in Navarro County, Texas. The couple had six children. Martha was born in Twiggs County, Georgia on June 22, 1846.

Martin attended the common schools in Alabama. He studied law at Troy State College, and was admitted to the bar. In 1850, he moved to Texas and engaged in the practice of law in Henderson County.

== Military service ==
Harrison enlisted in the Confederate States Army in 1861, with the Company K, 4th Infantry, Hood's Texas Brigade in the Texas Confederate Regiments during the Civil War. His regiment fought in the Eastern Theater of the American Civil War. The brigade served throughout the war in Robert E. Lee's Army of Northern Virginia and in James Longstreet's First Corps. In April 1864, Martin was promoted to the rank of Major.

Nobody is sure how he got the nickname of "Howdy," but one war-time legend has it that he saw Robert E. Lee, stood up in his stirrups and yelled, "Howdy!"

== Public service ==
He served as a member of the Texas State Senate 1853–1857 representing Freestone, Limestone, Henderson and Navarro counties.

After the war, Martin returned to Texas, continuing his law practice in Athens.

Martin was elected district attorney for Kaufman, Smith, Henderson and Anderson counties.

On February 12, 1887, he was elected as a Democrat to the 50th United States Congress to fill the vacancy of John H. Reagan who was chosen to serve in the United States Senate . Martin was reelected to the 51st United States Congress and served from November 4, 1887, to March 3, 1891. After which, he resumed his law practice. In 1888, Martin took offense to articles George Herbert Harries had written about him in The Washington Star, and responded by attacking him in the United States Capitol. Harries preferred charges; Martin pleaded guilty to assault and was fined five dollars.

== Death ==
William Harrison Martin died at his home near Hillsboro, Texas, February 5, 1898.

== External sources ==
- United States Congress. "William Harrison Martin (id: M000203)". Biographical Directory of the United States Congress.

U.S. House of Representatives
Preceded by Vacant	Member of the U.S. House of Representatives from Texas's 2nd congressional district November 4, 1887 - March 3, 1891	Succeeded by John B. Long
