= Office of Public Safety =

Former USAID program

Agency overview
- Formed: 1962
- Preceding agency: International Cooperation Administration
- Dissolved: 1974
- Agency executive: Byron Engle, Chief
- Parent department: United States Agency for International Development

The Office of Public Safety (OPS) was an international program of the federal government of the United States within the United States Agency for International Development (USAID) that provided overseas police training, assistance, and equipment to the security forces of NATO members and other U.S. allies. The program commenced in November 1962 and was terminated by the U.S. Congress in 1974.

== Origins and objectives ==
The OPS originated in the Public Safety program under the International Cooperation Administration (ICA) in 1954. In 1962, when the ICA was replaced by the USAID, the program was reorganized under the new title of "Office of Public Safety", consolidating various disparate overseas police training and assistance projects across the globe. Its director, CIA operative and police reformer Byron Engle, served from 1962 until his retirement in 1973.

Police assistance projects overseas had been established by the Eisenhower administration, but military intervention and covert action by the CIA was the primary method of addressing independence movements and left-wing political groups in recently decolonized poor and extremely poor countries. In the 1950s and 60s, covert action was increasingly unsuccessful, the most infamous example being the disastrous 1961 Bay of Pigs Invasion in Cuba. Already a proponent of modernization theory and international development programs as an alternative method of combating the spread of communism, Kennedy was receptive to the efforts of national security advisor Robert W. Komer to grow police assistance and make it the primary agent of counter-insurgency. Komer considered the police to be "more valuable than Special Forces in our global counter-insurgency efforts" and more cost-effective in that they did not require the expensive equipment and weaponry that military forces did. He described them as more successful as a preventative measure than any other program, providing "the first line of defense against demonstrations, riots and local insurrections. Only when the situation gets out of hand (as in South Vietnam) does the military have to be called in". Police were, as USAID director David E. Bell put it, "a most sensitive point of contact between the government and people, close to the focal points of unrest, and more acceptable than the army as keepers of order over long periods of time. The police are frequently better trained and equipped than the military to deal with minor forms of violence, conspiracy and subversion".

International development programs could present the modernization and expansion of security infrastructure as growing stability and preventing crime in these nations, without the bad optics of the CIA or the military. In a document drafted to launch the concept of the OPS, the USAID expressed concern over the optics of White American soldiers killing Indigenous peoples and other dissidents of non-White ethnicities: "In countering insurgency, the major effort must be indigenous. [...] In internal war it is always better for one national to kill another than for a foreigner—especially one with a different skin coloration to do so".

== Operations ==
The OPS operated in at least fifty-two countries in Asia, Africa, and the Americas. One of its main functions was counter-insurgency, aiding governments in the suppression of Marxist–Leninist, Maoist, and communist militant organizations. In total, it provided over $200M of USAID and CIA funds to recipient countries in weaponry, communications equipment, and tactical equipment. Its other functions were to facilitate the planting of CIA operatives within police forces of at-risk regions, and to find suitable candidates within these foreign forces to enrol in the CIA.

A total of 1500 advisers were deployed overseas, reaching over a million police officers. Alongside training, the OPS provided US-made equipment to overseas police forces, creating an aftermarket for upgrades and parts. Lauren "Jack" Goin set up forensics and fingerprinting labs in South Korea, Vietnam, Indonesia, the Dominican Republic and Brazil initially under the auspices of the 1290-d program and later under the OPS.

Police assistance proved to be far more cost-effective than military aid; excluding the immense South Vietnam project, the OPS's spending in 1968 was 5.8% of the military assistance budget for that year.

=== International Police Academy ===
The OPS-operated International Police Academy (IPA) was instituted in 1963, and provided training to 7500 senior officers from seventy-seven countries in total. Its first class included sixty-eight police officers from seventeen different nations. The officers were trained at the Georgetown Car Barn in Washington, D.C. Until the early 1970s, selected candidates could also receive training from CIA officers at the U.S. Border Patrol academy in Los Fresnos, Texas, including the making of bombs and incendiary devices.

The IPA trained senior police officers who would take the expertise and tactics home to train their subordinates. A major objective of the IPA was to cultivate these 'assets', instilling them with a degree of loyalty to the US which would theoretically make them a source of valuable information once they had risen within their home security institutions.

=== Role of the LAPD ===
The OPS conducted a form of international knowledge exchange by recruiting ordinary US police officers for 'short-term tours of duty' on overseas police assistance projects. The LAPD (Los Angeles Police Department) was a major source of such officers, partly because a significant proportion of them spoke Spanish.

LAPD officers were sent to Venezuela in 1962 to train local police officers and assist them in repression against the Armed Forces of National Liberation (AFNL). Officers were also sent to the Dominican Republic in the same year; there was significant popular unrest following the CIA-backed assassination of dictator Rafael Trujillo, and Dominican police were struggling to keep order and train officers.

=== Americas ===
==== Guatemala ====
The OPS program in Guatemala was the largest in Central America, with a $6 million budget and 32,000 police trained (370 at the IPA).

Guatemala first received US police assistance in 1954 following a CIA-backed coup to overthrow leader Jacobo Árbenz, who had implemented unprecedented land and labour reforms. Supporting his right-wing authoritarian replacement Carlos Castillo Armas, the ICA's 1290-d program operated with a $600,000 budget to professionalise the country's police force which was undisciplined and poorly equipped. Officers received counterinsurgency training, and an investigations bureau was set up to more systematically root out subversives.

==== Nicaragua ====
From 1971 until the OPS's termination, the Somoza regime received $81,000 worth of equipment including vehicles and radios from USAID to assist in rooting out "subversives", primarily the leftist anti-imperialist FSLN.

==== Uruguay ====
The OPS operated in Uruguay from 1964, providing $2 million in equipment, arms and training to assist the government in suppressing the National Liberation Movement (also known as the Tupamaros). Training involved courses on explosives, assassination, and riot control. Between 1969 and 1973, at least nineteen Uruguayan police officers were trained at the IPA and in Los Fresnos to be taught the handling of explosives. On several occasions, the pupils were not officers, but individuals affiliated with the Uruguayan right-wing.

The director of the Uruguayan police alleged that he had kidnapped homeless people for torture expert Dan Mitrione to use for teaching purposes, a claim corroborated by Cuban CIA operative Manuel Hevia Consculluela. Former CIA operative John Stockwell has written that their bodies would be left mutilated in the streets to induce fear.

==== Chile ====
After Salvador Allende was elected in 1970, he dismantled the OPS program in Chile and dismissed IPA-trained officials. Augusto Pinochet reinstated the program after he assumed power in the 1973 military coup. The OPS helped Chile build Police Operations Control Center (POCC) facilities, which were highly advanced training rooms designed to aid in combating unrest.

==== Bolivia ====
The Public Safety program's budget for Bolivia was $1.75 million in 1956, the biggest in Latin America at the time.

=== Africa ===
==== Somalia ====
In 1967, the OPS supplied weaponry, communications equipment and three aircraft to reinforce border security against Ethiopian forces, and built POCC facilities for civil unrest training.

==== Ghana ====
After a 1966 CIA-backed coup to overthrow Ghana's first leader after achieving independence, Kwame Nkrumah, the OPS established a $400,000 program, providing weapons and surveillance equipment to assist police in suppressing pro-Nkrumah and labour agitation.

==== Democratic Republic of Congo ====
After collaborating with Belgium to assassinate the newly independent Congo's first prime minister, Patrice Lumumba, the US enabled Mobutu Sese Seko to take power. The OPS spent $5 million in Congo on building and staffing police training facilities, riot gear, communications equipment, and developing 'paramilitary mobile brigades'.

=== Asia ===
==== South Vietnam ====
The OPS's most expensive and wide-ranging operation was based in South Vietnam. It took over from the Michigan State University Vietnam Advisory Group (MSUG) in 1962.

OPS introduced stop-and-frisk and identity cards, allowing increased surveillance and enabling police to demonstrate power on a more intimate level with individuals through the process of card checks.

==== Cambodia ====
The OPS's primary objective in Cambodia was training paramilitary units to clamp down on the Maoist Khmer Rouge. In 1963, the OPS provided $807,000 to build a police academy and a laboratory for forensics and photography, and trained six senior officers at the IPA.

==== Laos ====
The OPS budget for Laos was $900,000 in 1965 and $1.1 million the following year, providing a laboratory, surveillance equipment, small arms, and ammunition. In 1968, riot control equipment - tear gas and projectiles - were provided. Eleven officers were trained at the IPA.

==== Thailand ====
In 1973, the OPS provided Thailand's security forces with thousands of fragmentation grenades to strengthen its borders against potential insurgency in regions where relations with Laos and Malaysia were unstable.

==== Jordan ====
In the aftermath of the 1967 Six-Day War, the OPS provided Jordan with $1.1 million to aid in fighting Palestinian guerrilla fighters and suppressing riots.

== Controversy and Dissolution ==
In 1966, US senator J. William Fulbright started criticizing the OPS's methods. The bomb-making course at Los Fresnos was already highly controversial, and in 1970, Life magazine published a photo essay revealing the horrific conditions that prisoners of Con Son Island were kept in. The same year, the kidnapping and assassination of torture expert Dan Mitrione by Tupamaro guerrillas in Uruguay attracted much attention, fuelling existing accusations over the OPS's use of torture. Growing opposition to OPS activities resulted in a protest outside the IPA in November.

Overseas police assistance had become a serious issue simultaneously for antiwar and anti-imperialist activists, Black radicals and the New Left. This vocal coalition, in addition to information from a Brazilian opposition members about the US's role in human rights abuses in their country, spurred South Dakota Democratic Senator James G. Abourezk to expose the OPS's illicit activities and call for an end to overseas police aid. John A. Hannah, head of the USAID and former president of Michigan State University, unsuccessfully tried to support the OPS by sending a letter to deputy Otto Passman.

In 1974, Congress passed Section 660, an amendment to the Foreign Assistance Act (FAA) which banned provision by the US of training or assistance to foreign police. Many OPS missions were transferred to the Drug Enforcement Administration (DEA) and the Federal Bureau of Investigation (FBI). Exceptions were made to the prohibition on foreign police assistance if the recipient country was providing the funding as opposed to the US government, and for the policing of narcotics.

The US Department of Defense continued to transfer equipment to security forces in foreign countries. The International Criminal Investigative Training Assistance Program (ICITAP) was set up in 1986 as an 'officially recognized' police assistance body, employing many OPS employees. Many ex-OPS 'technicians' and advisors moved into the DEA, FBI and domestic law enforcement roles, bringing with them their Cold War counterinsurgency outlook and tactics. Others established or joined existing companies to do exactly what OPS had been, but for lucrative private contracts; for example, two advisors joined Vinnell Arabia which received an $80 million contract from Saudi Arabia to continue US training of its paramilitary National Guard. Venezuela and Nicaraguan governments also sought to continue training programs. Byron Engle became a consultant after his retirement in 1973, advising the Rhodesian government; Lauren Goin, who succeeded him as director for the last year of the program, formed his own company, Public Safety Services, Inc.

== See also ==
- School of the Americas
- U.S. Army and CIA interrogation manuals
- Plan Colombia
- PIDE, Portuguese police force
- Militarisation of Police
- Law Enforcement Support Office
- Michigan State University Vietnam Advisory Group
- SWAT
- Phoenix Program
- Operation Condor
