= History of Washington, D.C. =

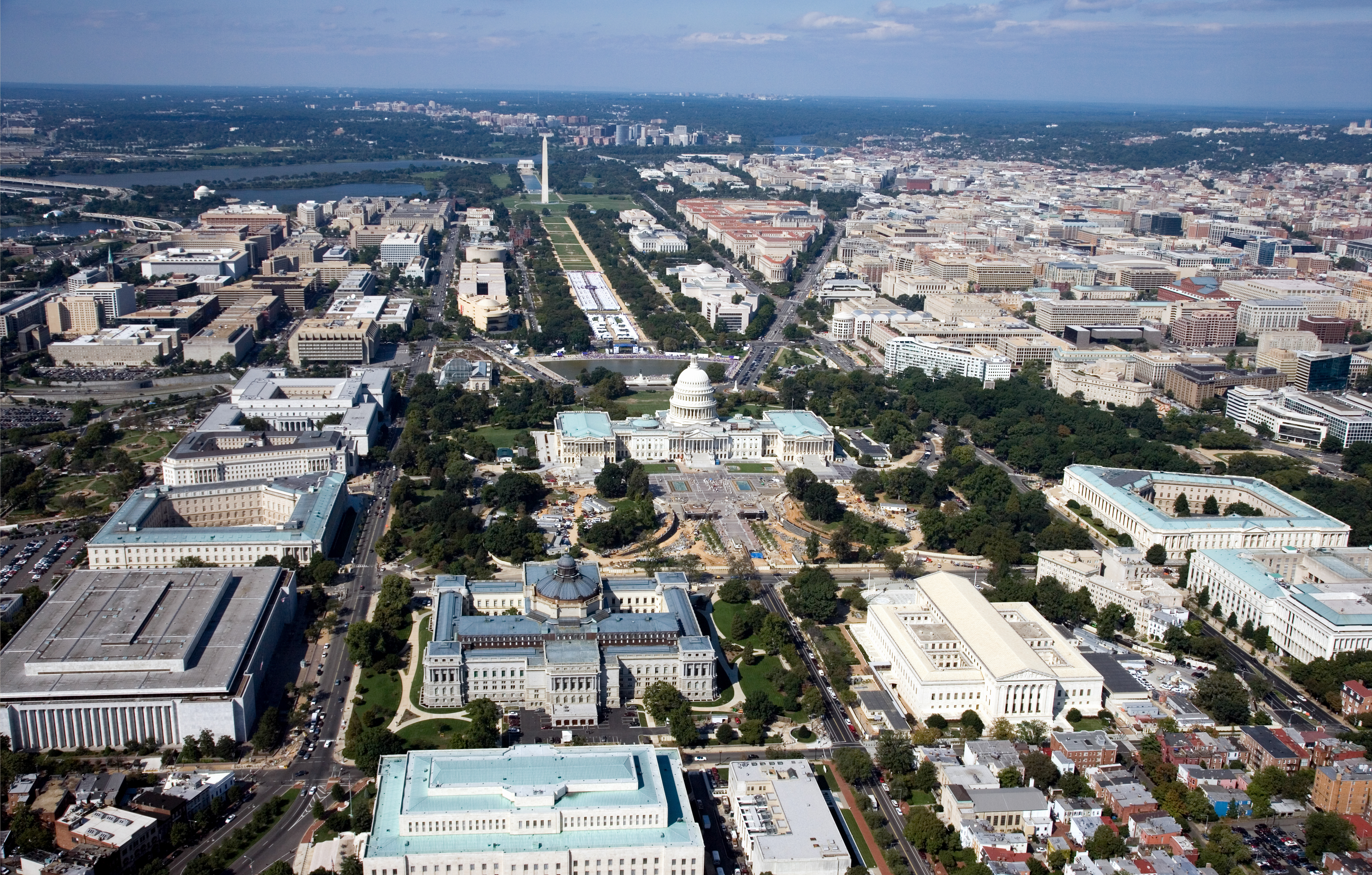
An aerial photo of Washington, D.C. in 2007

The history of Washington, D.C. is tied to its role as the capital of the United States. The site of the District of Columbia along the Potomac River was first selected by President George Washington. The city came under attack during the War of 1812. Upon the government's return to the capital, it had to manage the reconstruction of numerous public buildings, including the White House and the United States Capitol. The McMillan Plan of 1901 helped restore and beautify the downtown core area, including establishing the National Mall, along with numerous monuments and museums.

Relative to other major cities with a high percentage of African Americans, Washington, D.C. has had a significant black population since the city's creation. As a result, Washington became both a center of African American culture and a center of the civil rights movement. Since the city government was run by the U.S. federal government, black and white school teachers were paid at an equal scale as workers for the federal government. It was not until the administration of Woodrow Wilson, a Southern Democrat who had numerous Southerners in his cabinet, that federal offices and workplaces were segregated, starting in 1913. This situation persisted for decades: the city was racially segregated in certain facilities until the 1950s.

Neighborhoods on the eastern periphery of the central city and east of the Anacostia River tend to be disproportionately lower-income. Following World War II, many middle-income whites moved out of the city's central and eastern sections to newer, affordable suburban housing, with commuting eased by highway construction. The assassination of Martin Luther King Jr. in Memphis, Tennessee on April 4, 1968, sparked major riots in chiefly African American neighborhoods east of Rock Creek Park. Large sections of the central city remained blighted for decades. Areas west of the Park, including virtually the entire portion of the District between the Georgetown and Chevy Chase neighborhoods, include some of the nation's most affluent and notable neighborhoods. During the early 20th century, the U Street Corridor served as an important center for African American culture in the city. The Washington Metro opened in 1976. A rising economy and gentrification in the late 1990s and early 2000s led to the revitalization of many downtown neighborhoods.

Article One, Section 8, of the United States Constitution places the District, which is not a state, under the exclusive legislation of Congress. Throughout its history, Washington, D.C. residents have therefore lacked voting representation in Congress. The Twenty-third Amendment to the United States Constitution, ratified in 1961, gave the District three electoral votes, implicitly authorizing it to hold an election for president and vice president. The 1973 District of Columbia Home Rule Act provided the local government more control of affairs, including direct election of the city council and mayor.

== Early settlement ==
Archaeological evidence indicates Native American Indian tribes relocated to the area at least 4,000 years ago, where they settled around the Anacostia River. Early European exploration of the region took place early in the 17th century, including explorations by Captain John Smith in 1608.

At the time, the Patawomeck, loosely affiliated with the Powhatan, and the Doeg lived on the Virginia side of present-day Washington, D.C. and on Theodore Roosevelt Island, and the Piscataway, also known as Conoy tribe of Algonquians, resided on the Maryland side. Native inhabitants within present-day Washington, D.C., included the Nacotchtank, at Anacostia, who were affiliated with the Conoy. Another village was located between Little Falls and Georgetown, and English fur trader Henry Fleet documented a Nacotchtank village called Tohoga on the site of present-day Georgetown.

The first colonial-era landowners in the present-day Washington, D.C. were George Thompson and Thomas Gerrard, who were granted the Blue Plains tract in 1662, along with Saint Elizabeth, and other tracts in Anacostia, Capitol Hill, and other areas down to the Potomac River in the following years. Thompson sold his Capitol Hill properties in 1670, including Duddington Manor, to Thomas Notley. The Duddington property was handed down over the generations to Daniel Carroll of Duddington. As European settlers arrived, they clashed with the Native Americans over grazing rights.

In 1697, the colonial-era Province of Maryland authorized the building of a fort within what is now Washington, D.C. The same year, the Conoy relocated to the west, near what is now The Plains, Virginia, and in 1699 they moved again to Conoy Island near Point of Rocks, Maryland.

Georgetown was established in 1751 when the Maryland General Assembly purchased sixty acres of land for the town from George Gordon and George Beall at the price of £280, while Alexandria, Virginia was founded in 1749.

Situated on the fall line, Georgetown was the farthest point upstream to which oceangoing boats could navigate the Potomac River. The strong flow of the Potomac kept a navigable channel clear year-round, and the daily tidal lift of the Chesapeake Bay raised the Potomac's elevation in its lower reach such that fully laden ocean-going ships could navigate easily, all the way to Chesapeake Bay. Around 1745, Gordon constructed a tobacco inspection house along the Potomac River.

Warehouses, wharves, and other buildings were added, and the settlement rapidly grew. Old Stone House in present-day Georgetown, was built in 1765 and is the oldest standing building in Washington, D.C. Georgetown later grew into a thriving port, facilitating trade and shipments of tobacco and other goods from the colonial-era Province of Maryland.

In 1780, with the economic and population growth in Georgetown, Georgetown University was founded, drawing students from as far away as the West Indies.

== Founding ==
=== Establishment ===
Territorial progression of Washington, D.C.

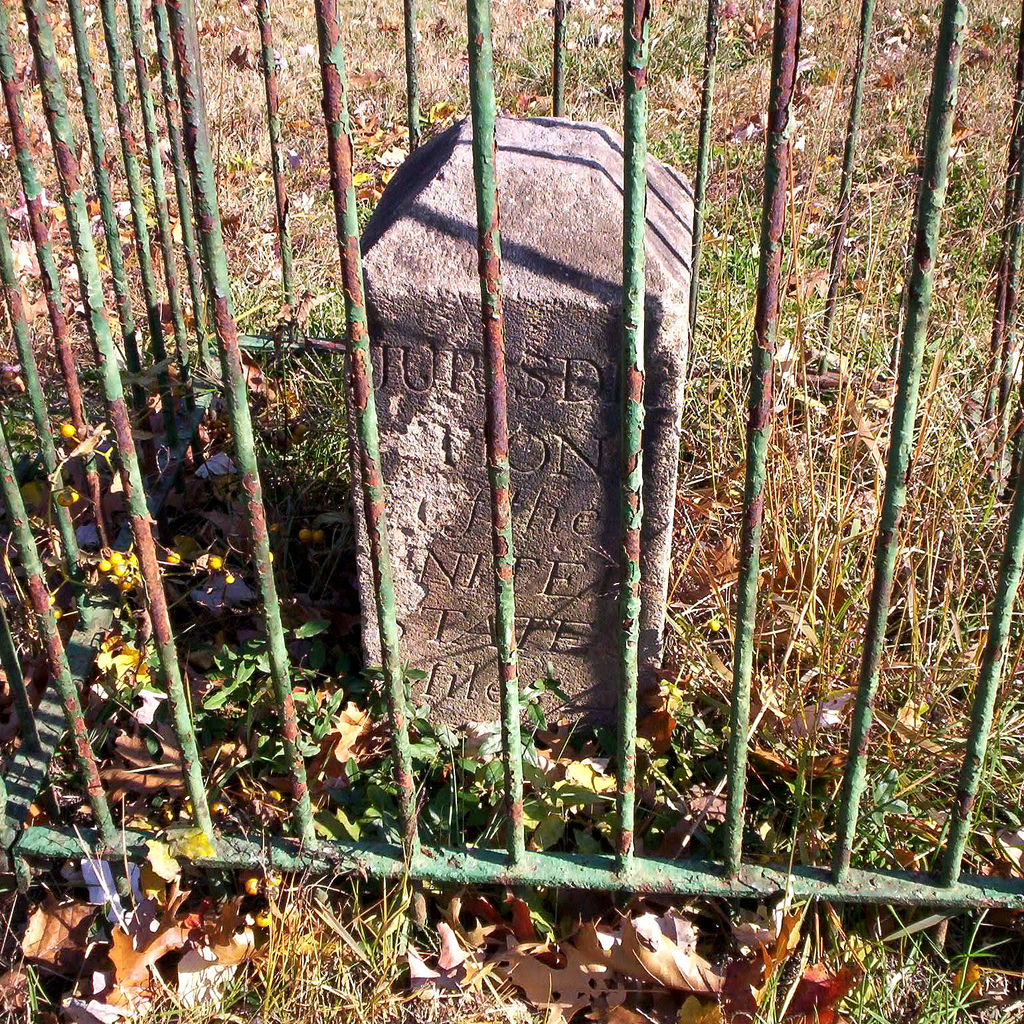
The Northeast Boundary No. 4 marker stone of the original border between the District of Columbia and Prince George's County, Maryland

The United States capital was originally located in Philadelphia, beginning with the First and Second Continental Congress, followed by the Congress of the Confederation upon ratification of the first federal constitution. In June 1783, a mob of angry soldiers converged upon Independence Hall in Philadelphia to demand payment for their service during the American Revolutionary War. Congress requested that John Dickinson, the governor of Pennsylvania, call up the militia to defend Congress from attacks by the protesters.

In what became known as the Pennsylvania Mutiny of 1783, Dickinson sympathized with the protesters and refused to remove them from Philadelphia. As a result, Congress was forced to flee to Princeton, New Jersey, on June 21, 1783.

On October 6, 1783, while still in Princeton, Congress resolved itself into a committee of the whole to consider a place for the permanent residence of Congress. The following day, Elbridge Gerry of Massachusetts motioned "that buildings for the use of Congress be erected on the banks of the Delaware near Trenton or of the Potomac, near Georgetown, provided a suitable district can be procured on one of the rivers as aforesaid, for a federal town". Dickinson's failure to protect the institutions of the national government was discussed at the Philadelphia Convention in 1787 In Article One, Section 8, of the United States Constitution, the delegates granted Congress the power:

To exercise exclusive Legislation in all Cases whatsoever, over such District (not exceeding ten Miles square) as may, by Cession of Particular States, and the Acceptance of Congress, become the Seat of the Government of the United States, and to exercise like Authority over all Places purchased by the Consent of the Legislature of the State in which the Same shall be, for the Erection of Forts, Magazines, Arsenals, dock-Yards and other needful Buildings;

James Madison, writing in Federalist No. 43, also argued that the national capital needed to be distinct from the states, to provide for its own maintenance and safety. The Constitution, however, does not select a specific site for the location of the new District.

Proposals from the legislatures of Maryland, New Jersey, New York, and Virginia all offered territory for the national capital location. Northern states preferred a capital located in one of the nation's prominent cities, unsurprisingly, almost all of which were in the north. Southern states, on the other hand, preferred that the capital be located closer to their agricultural and slave-holding interests. The selection of the area around the Potomac River, which was the boundary between Maryland and Virginia, both slave states, was agreed upon between Madison, Thomas Jefferson, and Alexander Hamilton. Hamilton had a proposal for the new federal government to take over debts accrued by the states during the American Revolutionary War. However, by 1790, Southern states had largely repaid their overseas debts. Hamilton's proposal would require Southern states to assume a share of Northern debt. Jefferson and Madison agreed to this proposal and, in return, secured a Southern location for the federal capital.

On December 23, 1788, the Maryland General Assembly passed an act, allowing it to cede land for the federal district. The Virginia General Assembly followed suit on December 3, 1789. The signing of the federal Residence Act on July 16, 1790, mandated that the site for the permanent seat of government, "not exceeding ten miles square" (100 square miles), be located on the "river Potomack, at some place between the mouths of the Eastern-Branch and Connogochegue". The "Eastern-Branch" is known today as the Anacostia River. The Conococheague Creek empties into the Potomac River upstream near Williamsport and Hagerstown, Maryland. The Residence Act limited to the Maryland side of the Potomac River the location of land that commissioners appointed by the President could acquire for federal use.

The Residence Act authorized President George Washington to select the actual location of the site. However, he wished to include Alexandria, Virginia, within the federal district. To accomplish this, the boundaries of the federal district would need to encompass an area on the Potomac that was downstream of the mouth of the Eastern Branch.

The U.S. Congress amended the Residence Act in 1791 to permit Alexandria's inclusion in the federal district. However, some members of Congress had recognized that Washington and his family owned property in and near Alexandria, which was just seven miles (11 km) upstream from Mount Vernon, Washington's home and plantation. The amendment, therefore, contained a provision that prohibited the "erection of the public buildings otherwise than on the Maryland side of the river Potomac".

The final site was just below the fall line on the Potomac River, the furthest inland point navigable by boats. It included the ports of Georgetown and Alexandria. The process of establishing the federal district, however, faced other challenges in the form of strong objections from landowners such as David Burnes, who owned a large, 650-acre (260 ha) tract of land in the heart of the district. On March 30, 1791, Burns and eighteen other key landowners relented and signed an agreement with Washington, where they would be compensated for any land taken for public use, half of the remaining land would be distributed among the proprietors, and the other half to the public.

Pursuant to the Residence Act, President Washington appointed three commissioners (Thomas Johnson, Daniel Carroll, and David Stuart) in 1791 to supervise the planning, design, and acquisition of property in the federal district and capital city. In September 1791, using the toponym Columbia and the name of the president, the three commissioners agreed to name the federal district as the Territory of Columbia, and the federal city as the City of Washington.

On March 30, 1791, President Washington issued a presidential proclamation that established "Jones's point, the upper cape of Hunting Creek in Virginia" as the starting point for the federal district's boundary survey. The proclamation also described the method by which the survey should determine the district's boundaries. Working under the general supervision of the three commissioners and at the direction of President Washington, Major Andrew Ellicott, assisted by his brothers Benjamin and Joseph Ellicott, Isaac Roberdeau, Isaac Briggs, George Fenwick, and, initially, an African American astronomer, Benjamin Banneker, then proceeded to survey the borders of the Territory of Columbia with Virginia and Maryland during 1791 and 1792.

The survey team enclosed within a square an area containing the full 100 square miles (260 km^{2}) that the Residence Act had authorized. Each side of the square was 10 miles (16 km) long. The axes between the corners of the square ran north–south and east–west. The center of the square is within the grounds of the Organization of American States headquarters west of the Ellipse.

The survey team placed forty sandstone boundary markers at or near every mile point along the sides of the square. Thirty-six of these markers still remain. The south cornerstone is at Jones Point. The west cornerstone is at the west corner of Arlington County, Virginia. The north cornerstone is south of East-West Highway near Silver Spring, Maryland, west of 16th Street. The east cornerstone is east of the intersection of Southern Avenue and Eastern Avenue.

On January 1, 1793, Andrew Ellicott submitted to the commissioners a report that stated that the boundary survey had been completed and that all of the boundary marker stones had been set in place. Ellicott's report described the marker stones and contained a map that showed the boundaries and topographical features of the Territory of Columbia. The map identified the locations within the Territory of the planned City of Washington and its major streets and the location of each boundary marker stone.

=== Plan of the City of Washington ===
The L'Enfant Plan for the city

View of the City of Washington in 1792

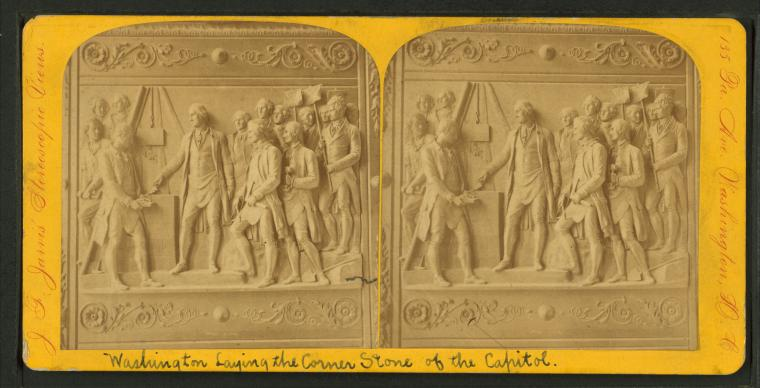
On September 18, 1793, an engraving of George Washington, known as the First Cornerstone, was placed as the corner stone of the United States Capitol.

In early 1791, President George Washington, in preparation for the move of the national capital from Philadelphia, appointed Pierre (Peter) Charles L'Enfant to devise a plan for the new city in an area of land at the center of the federal territory that lay between the northeast shore of the Potomac River and the northwest shore of the Potomac's Eastern Branch. L'Enfant then designed in his "Plan of the city intended for the permanent seat of the government of the United States ... " the city's first layout, a grid centered on the United States Capitol, which would stand at the top of a hill (Jenkins Hill) on a longitude designated as 0,0°. The grid filled an area bounded by the Potomac River, the Eastern Branch (now named the Anacostia River), the base of an escarpment at the Atlantic Seaboard Fall Line along which a street, initially Boundary Street, now Florida Avenue, would later travel, and Rock Creek.

North–south, and east–west streets formed the grid. Wider diagonal "grand avenues" later named after the states of the union crossed the grid. Where these "grand avenues" crossed each other, L'Enfant placed open spaces in circles and plazas that were later named after notable Americans.

L'Enfant's broadest "grand avenue" was a 400-foot-wide (122 m) garden-lined esplanade, which he expected to travel for about 1 mile (1.6 km) along an east–west axis in the center of an area that the National Mall now occupies. The narrower Pennsylvania Avenue connected "Congress house" (the Capitol) with the "President's house" (the White House). In time, Pennsylvania Avenue developed into the capital city's present "grand avenue".

L'Enfant's plan included a system of canals, one of which would travel near the western side of the Capitol at the base of Jenkins Hill. To be filled by the waters of Tiber Creek, also named "Goose Creek", and James Creek, the canal system would traverse the center of the city and entered both the Potomac River and the Eastern Branch.

On June 22, L'Enfant presented his first plan for the federal city to the President. On August 19, he appended a new map to a letter that he sent to the President.

President Washington retained one of L'Enfant's plans, showed it to Congress, and later gave it to the three Commissioners. The survey map may be one that L'Enfant appended to his August 19 letter to the President.

L'Enfant subsequently entered into a number of conflicts with the three commissioners and others involved in the enterprise. During a contentious period in February 1792, Andrew Ellicott, who had been conducting the original boundary survey of the future District of Columbia and the survey of the federal city under the direction of the Commissioners, informed the Commissioners that L'Enfant had not been able to have the city plan engraved and had refused to provide him with the original plan (of which L'Enfant had prepared several versions).

Ellicott, with the aid of his brother, Benjamin Ellicott, then revised the plan, despite L'Enfant's protests. Ellicott's revisions, which included the straightening of the longer avenues and the removal of Square No. 15 from L'Enfant's original plan, created minor changes to the city's layout.

Ellicott stated in his letters that, although he was refused the original plan, he was familiar with L'Enfant's system and had many notes of the surveys that he had made himself. It is, therefore, possible that Ellicott recreated the plan.

Shortly thereafter, Washington dismissed L'Enfant. Ellicott gave the first version of his own plan to James Thakara and John Vallance of Philadelphia, who engraved, printed, and published it. This version, printed in March 1792, was the first Washington city plan that received wide circulation.

After L'Enfant departed, Ellicott continued the city survey in accordance with his revised plan, several larger and more detailed versions of which were also engraved, published and distributed. As a result, Ellicott's revisions became the basis for the capital city's future development.

In 1800, the seat of the federal government was moved to the new city, and on February 27, 1801, the District of Columbia Organic Act of 1801 placed the District under the jurisdiction of the U.S. Congress. The act also organized the unincorporated territory within the District into two counties: the County of Washington on the northeast bank of the Potomac and the County of Alexandria on the southwest bank. On May 3, 1802, the City of Washington was granted a municipal government consisting of a mayor appointed by the President of the United States.

== 19th century ==
=== Economic development ===
The District of Columbia relied on Congress to support capital improvements and economic development initiatives. However, Congress lacked loyalty to the city's residents and was reluctant to provide support. In 1800, one congressman said Washington was "a city in ruins", disappointed at the city's crowded lodgings, dreary appearance, and the lack of amenities. Congress did provide funding for the Washington City Canal in 1809, after earlier private financing efforts were unsuccessful. Construction began in 1810 and the canal opened in late 1815, connecting the Anacostia River with Tiber Creek.

Construction of the Chesapeake and Ohio Canal (C&O) began in Georgetown in 1828. Construction westward through Maryland proceeded slowly. The first section, from Georgetown to Seneca, Maryland, opened in 1831. In 1833 an extension was built from Georgetown eastward, connecting to the City Canal. The C&O reached Cumberland, Maryland in 1850, although by that time it was obsolete as the Baltimore and Ohio Railroad (B&O) had arrived in Cumberland in 1842. The canal had financial problems, and plans for further construction to reach the Ohio River were abandoned.

=== War of 1812 ===
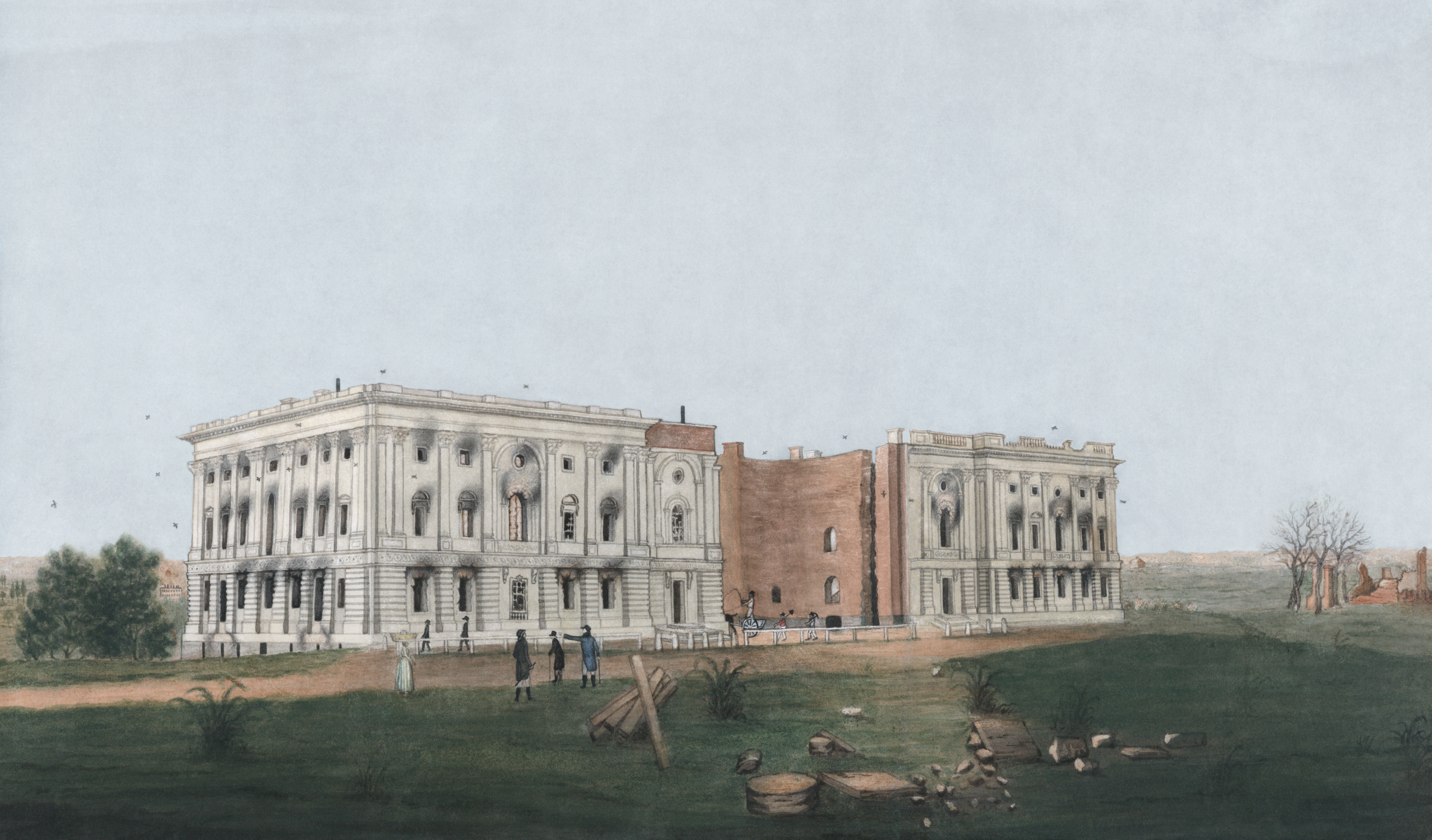
An 1814 watercolor illustration of the United States Capitol after the burning of Washington during the War of 1812

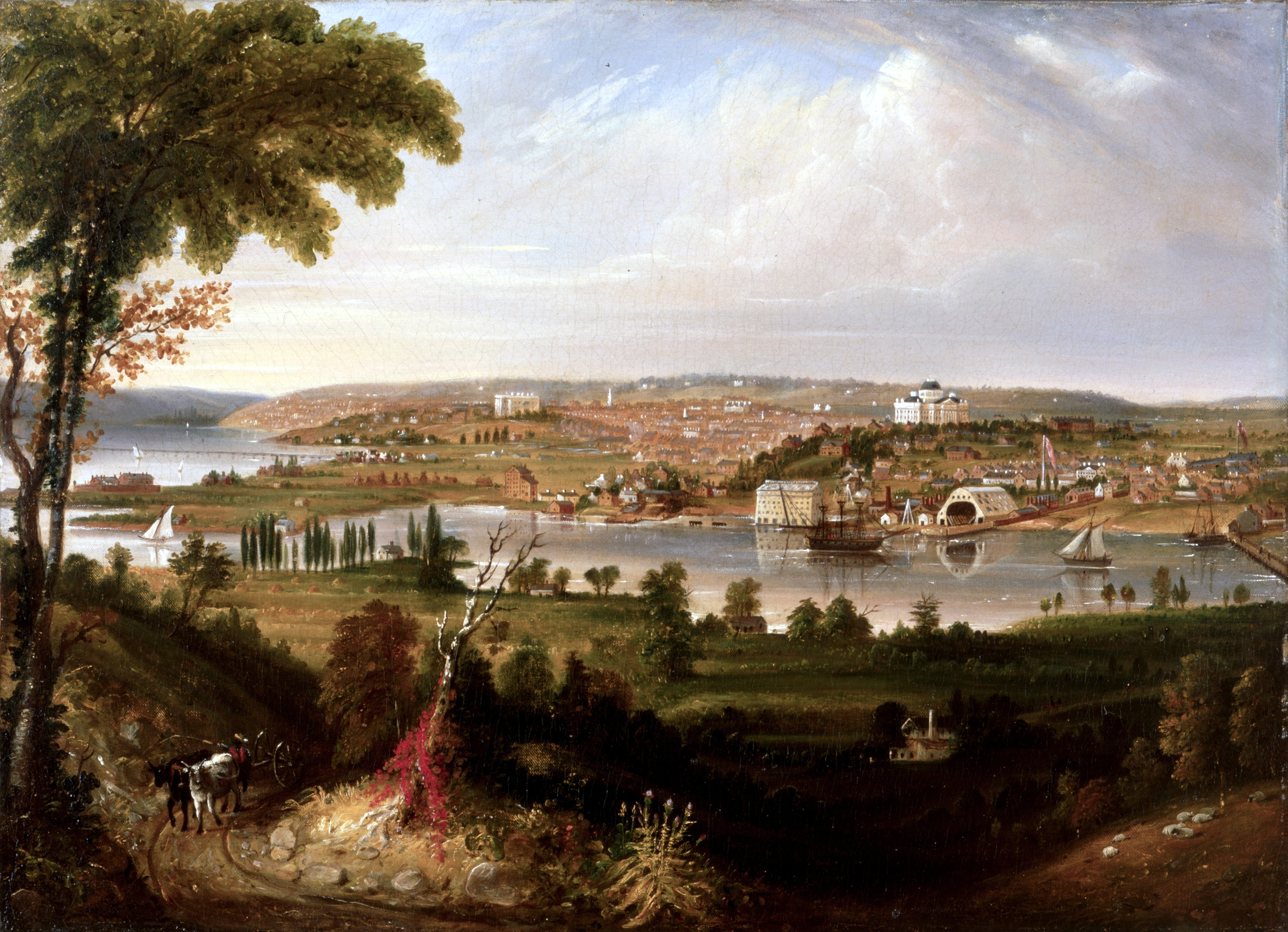
City of Washington from Beyond the Navy Yard, an 1833 portrait by George Cooke in the Oval Office in the White House

During the War of 1812, the British Army conducted an expedition between August 19 and 29, 1814, that took and burned the capital city. In the Battle of Bladensburg on August 24, the British routed an American militia, which had gathered at Bladensburg, Maryland to protect the capital. The militia then abandoned Washington without a fight. President James Madison and the remainder of the U.S. government fled the capital shortly before the British arrived.

The British then entered and burned the capital during the most notably destructive raid of the war. British troops set fire to the capital's most important public buildings, including the Presidential Mansion (the White House), the United States Capitol, the Arsenal, the Navy Yard, the Treasury Building, and the War Office, as well as the north end of the Long Bridge, which crossed the Potomac River into Virginia. The British, however, spared the Patent Office and the Marine Barracks. Dolley Madison, the first lady, or perhaps members of the house staff, rescued the Lansdowne Portrait, a full-length painting of George Washington by Gilbert Stuart, as the British approached the Mansion.

The aftermath of the war kicked off a mild crisis, with many northerners pushing for a relocation of the capitol with a vote brought to the floor of Congress proposing the removal of the government to Philadelphia. It was defeated 83 to 74 votes, and the seat of government remained in Washington, D.C.

=== Railroads arrive in Washington ===
The Baltimore and Ohio Railroad opened a rail line from Baltimore to Washington in 1835. Passenger traffic on the Washington Branch had increased by the 1850s, as the company opened a large station in 1851 on New Jersey Avenue NW, just north of the Capitol. Further railroad development continued after the Civil War, with a new B&O line, the Metropolitan Branch, connecting Washington, D.C. to the west, and the introduction of competition from the Baltimore and Potomac Railroad in the 1870s. In 1907, Washington Union Station opened as the city's central terminal.

=== Retrocession ===
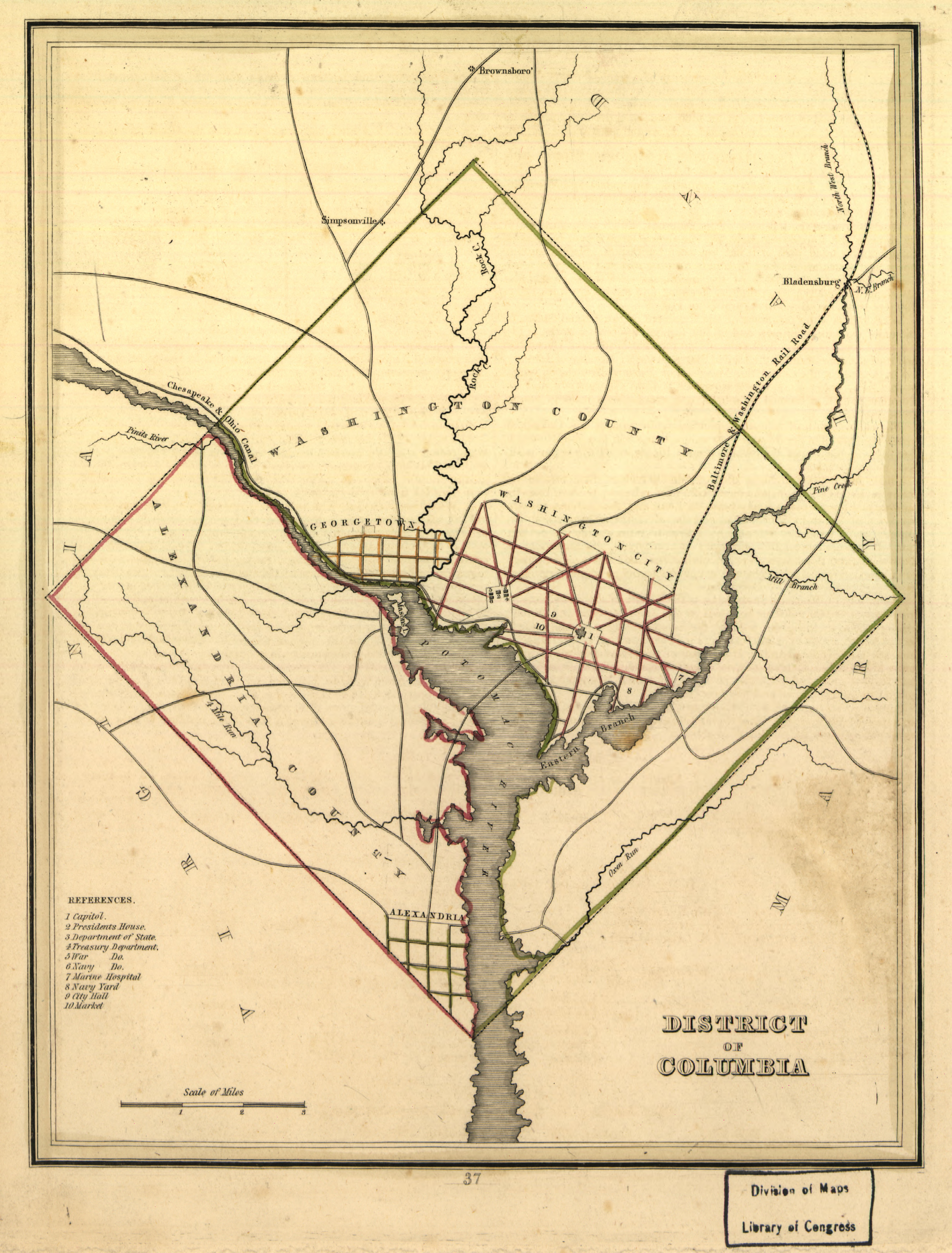
Map of the District of Columbia in 1835, prior to the retrocession

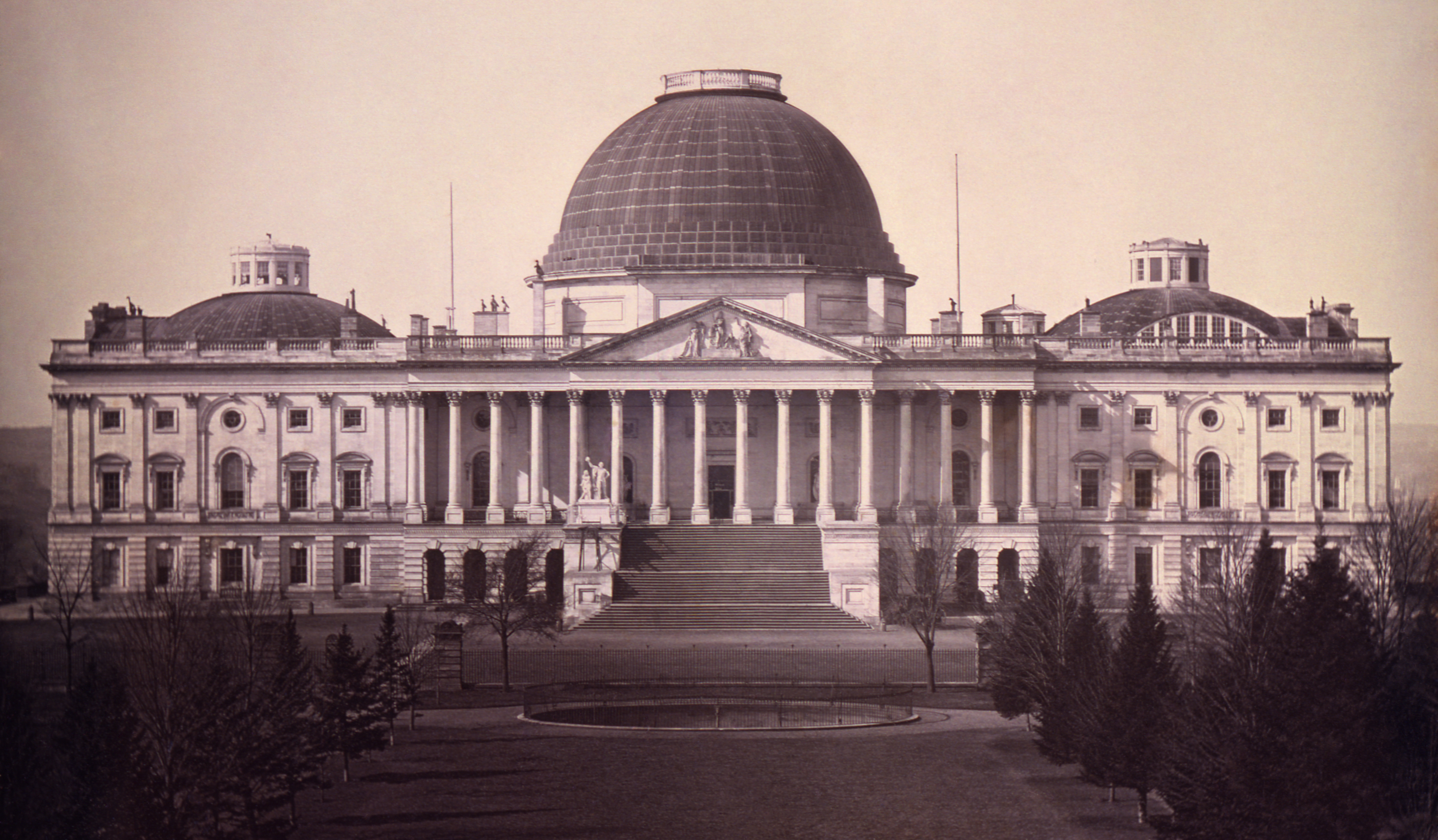
The United States Capitol in 1846, prior to the addition of the current rotunda

Almost immediately after the "Federal City" was laid out north of the Potomac River, some residents south of the Potomac River in Alexandria County, D.C., began petitioning to be returned to Virginia's jurisdiction. Over time, a larger movement grew to separate Alexandria from the District for several reasons:

- Alexandria was a center for slave trading. There was increasing talk of abolition of slavery in the national capital. Alexandria's economy would suffer if slavery were outlawed in the District of Columbia. In 1848, then Congressman Abraham Lincoln submitted a bill to abolish slavery within the District, which failed.
- There was an active abolition movement in Virginia; the pro-slavery faction held a slim majority in the Virginia General Assembly. If Alexandria and Alexandria County were retroceded to Virginia, they would provide two new pro-slavery representatives.
- Alexandria's economy had stagnated as competition with the port of Georgetown, D.C., had begun to favor the north side of the Potomac, where most members of Congress and local federal officials resided.
- The Residence Act prohibited federal offices from locating in Virginia.
- The Alexandria Canal, which connected the C&O Canal to Alexandria, needed repairs, which the federal government was reluctant to fund.

After a referendum, Alexandria County's citizens petitioned Congress and Virginia to return the area to Virginia. By an act of Congress on July 9, 1846, and with the approval of the Virginia General Assembly, the area south of the Potomac (39 square miles or 100 square kilometers) was returned, or "retroceded", to Virginia effective in 1847.

The retroceded land, then known as Alexandria County, includes a portion of the independent city of Alexandria and all of Arlington County. A large portion of the retroceded land near the river was an estate of George Washington Parke Custis, who had supported the retrocession and helped develop the charter in the Virginia General Assembly for the County of Alexandria, Virginia. The estate, then known as Arlington Plantation, was passed on to his daughter, the wife of Robert E. Lee, eventually became Arlington National Cemetery.

=== Civil War era ===
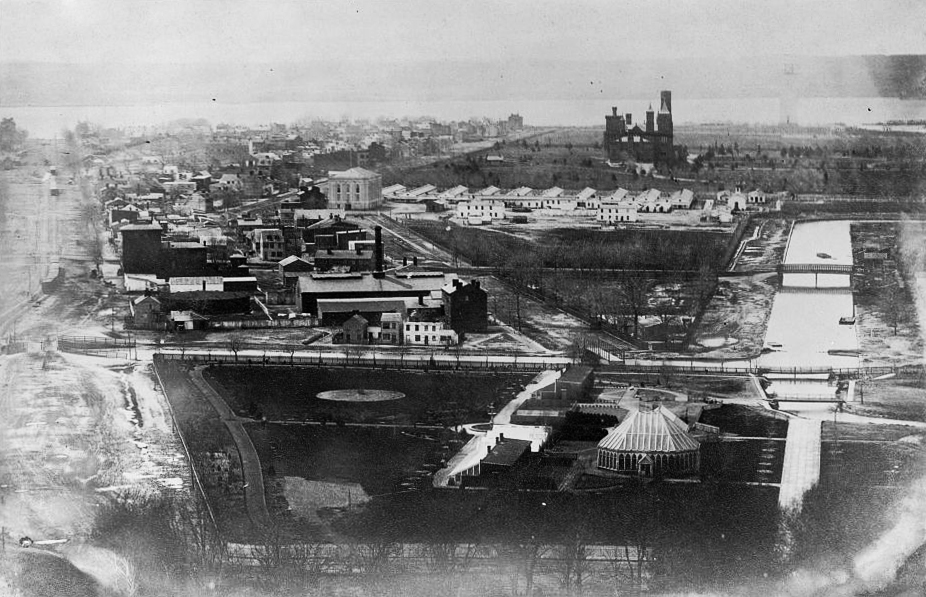
The southern portion of the National Mall in 1863 during the American Civil War

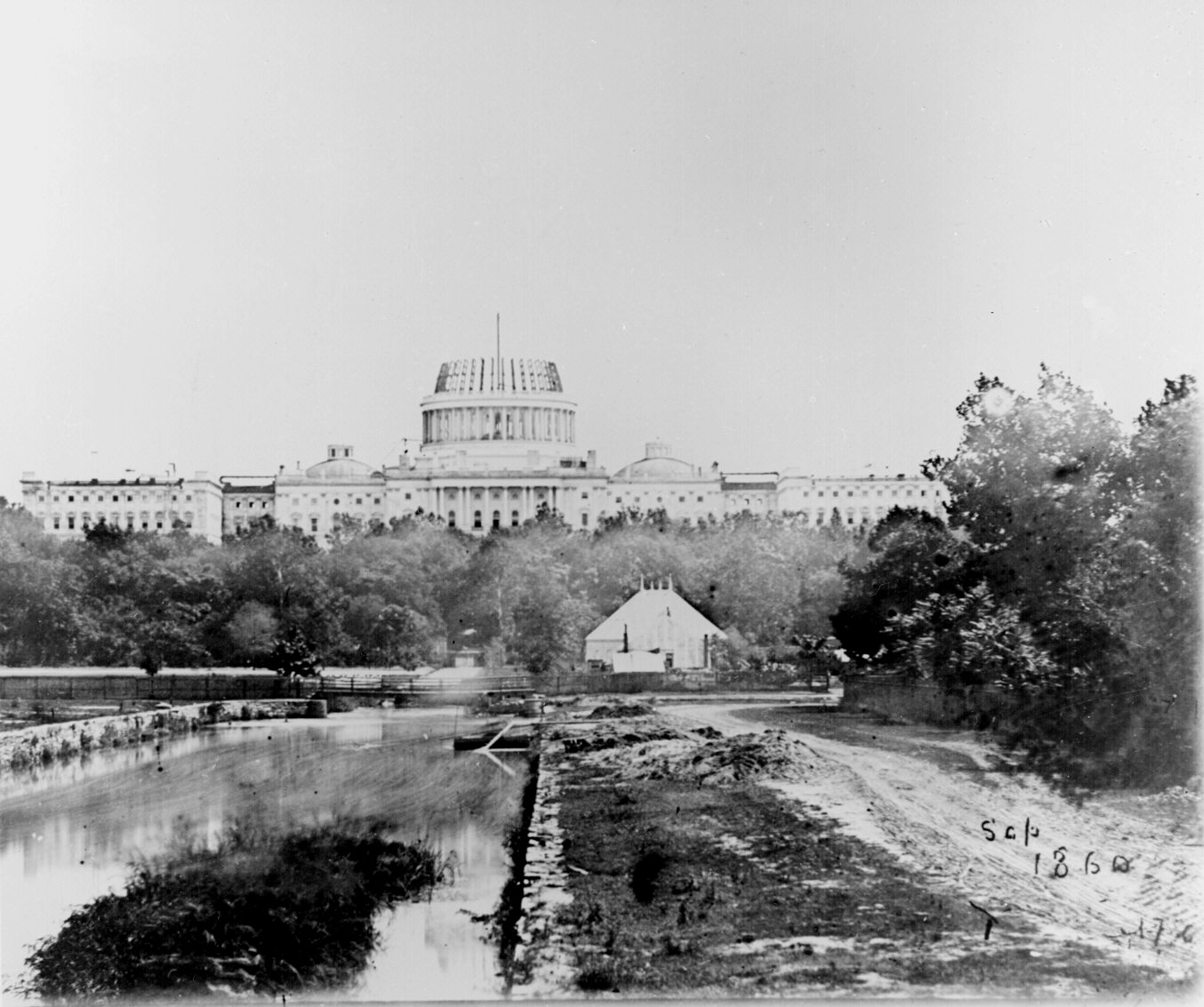
President Abraham Lincoln insisted that construction of the United States Capitol continue during the Civil War.

A portion of the Washington Aqueduct opened in 1859, providing drinking water to city residents and reducing their dependence on well water. The aqueduct built by the United States Army Corps of Engineers opened for full operation in 1864, using the Potomac River as its source.

Washington remained a small city of a few thousand residents, virtually deserted during the summertime, until the outbreak of the American Civil War in 1861. President Abraham Lincoln created the Army of the Potomac to defend the federal capital, and thousands of soldiers came to the area. The significant expansion of the federal government to administer the war—and its legacies, such as veterans' pensions—led to notable growth in the city's population – from 75,000 in 1860 to 132,000 in 1870.

Slavery was abolished throughout the District on April 16, 1862, eight months before Lincoln issued the Emancipation Proclamation, with the passage of the Compensated Emancipation Act. The city became a popular place for freed slaves to congregate.

Throughout the Civil War, the city was defended by a ring of Union Army forts that mostly deterred the Confederate army from attacking. One notable exception was the Battle of Fort Stevens in July 1864, in which Union soldiers repelled troops under the command of Confederate General Jubal A. Early. This battle was only the second time a U.S. president came under enemy fire during wartime when Lincoln visited the fort to observe the fighting; the first was James Madison during the War of 1812. Over 20,000 sick and injured Union soldiers were treated in various permanent and temporary hospitals in the capital.

=== Post-Civil War era ===
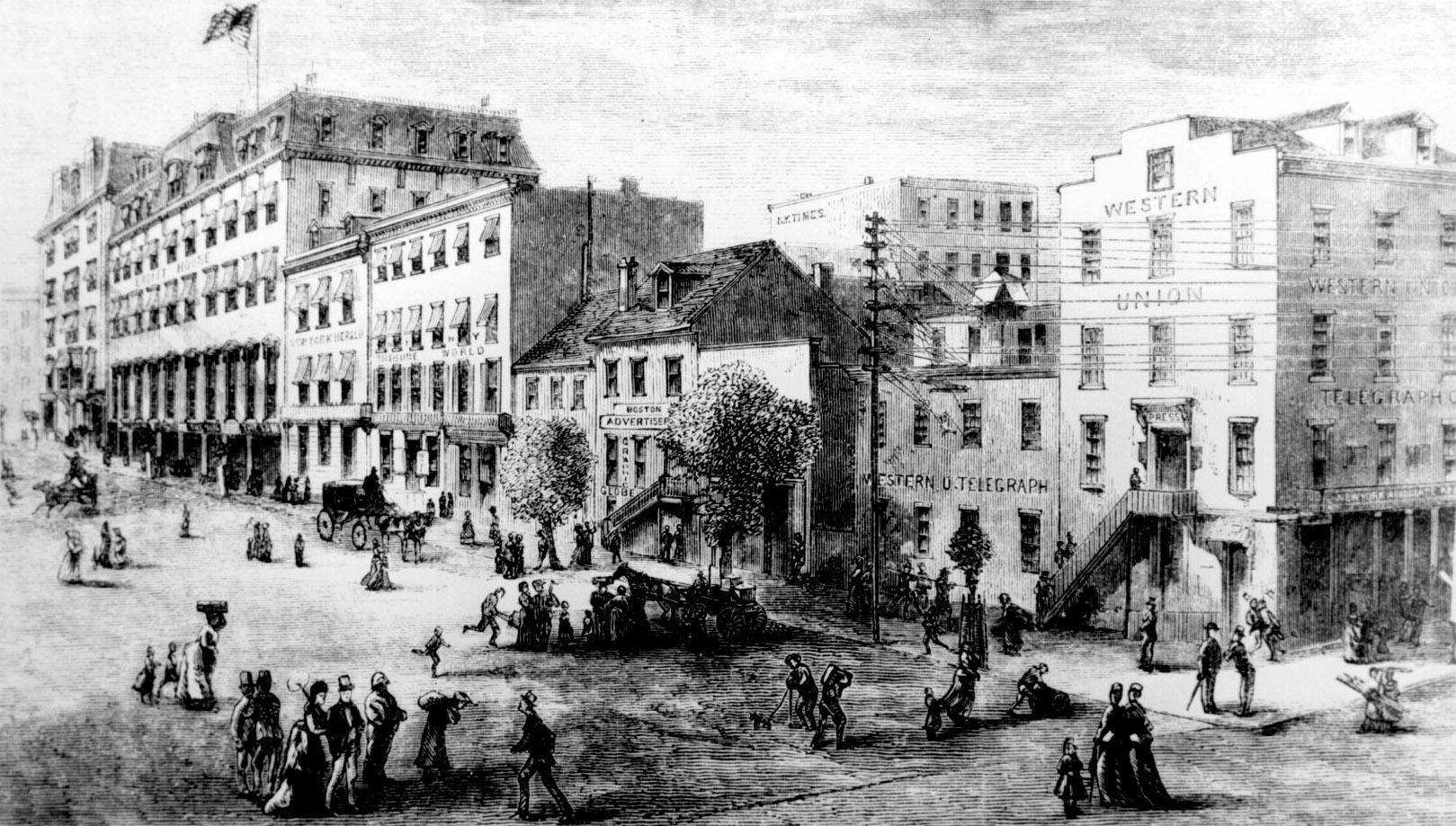
Newspaper Row on Pennsylvania Avenue in 1874

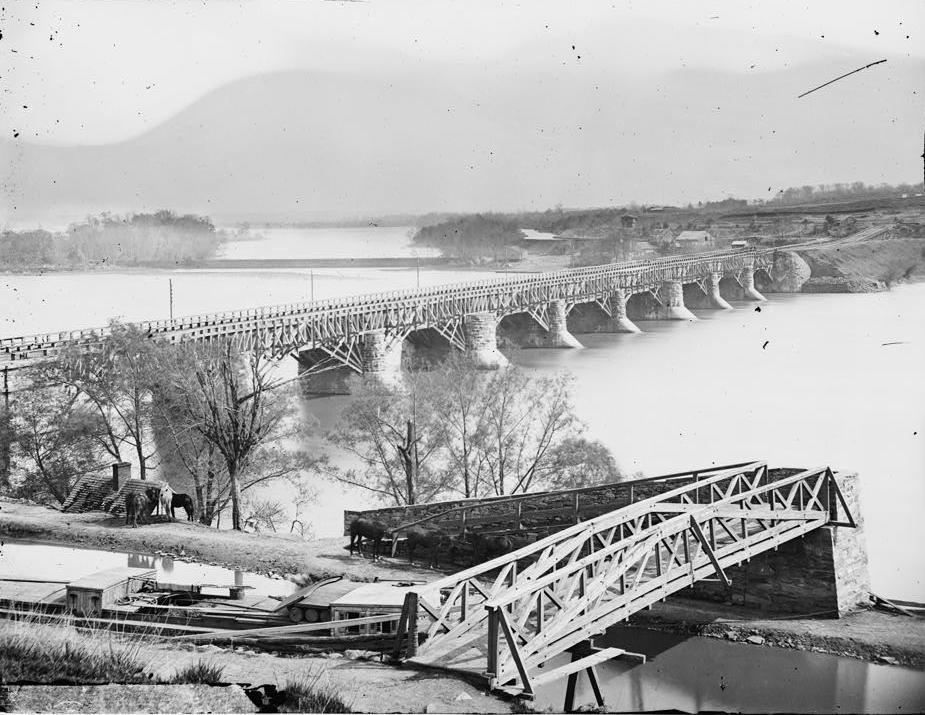
The Aqueduct Bridge crossing the Potomac River, with Northern Virginia in the background and the Chesapeake and Ohio Canal in the foreground

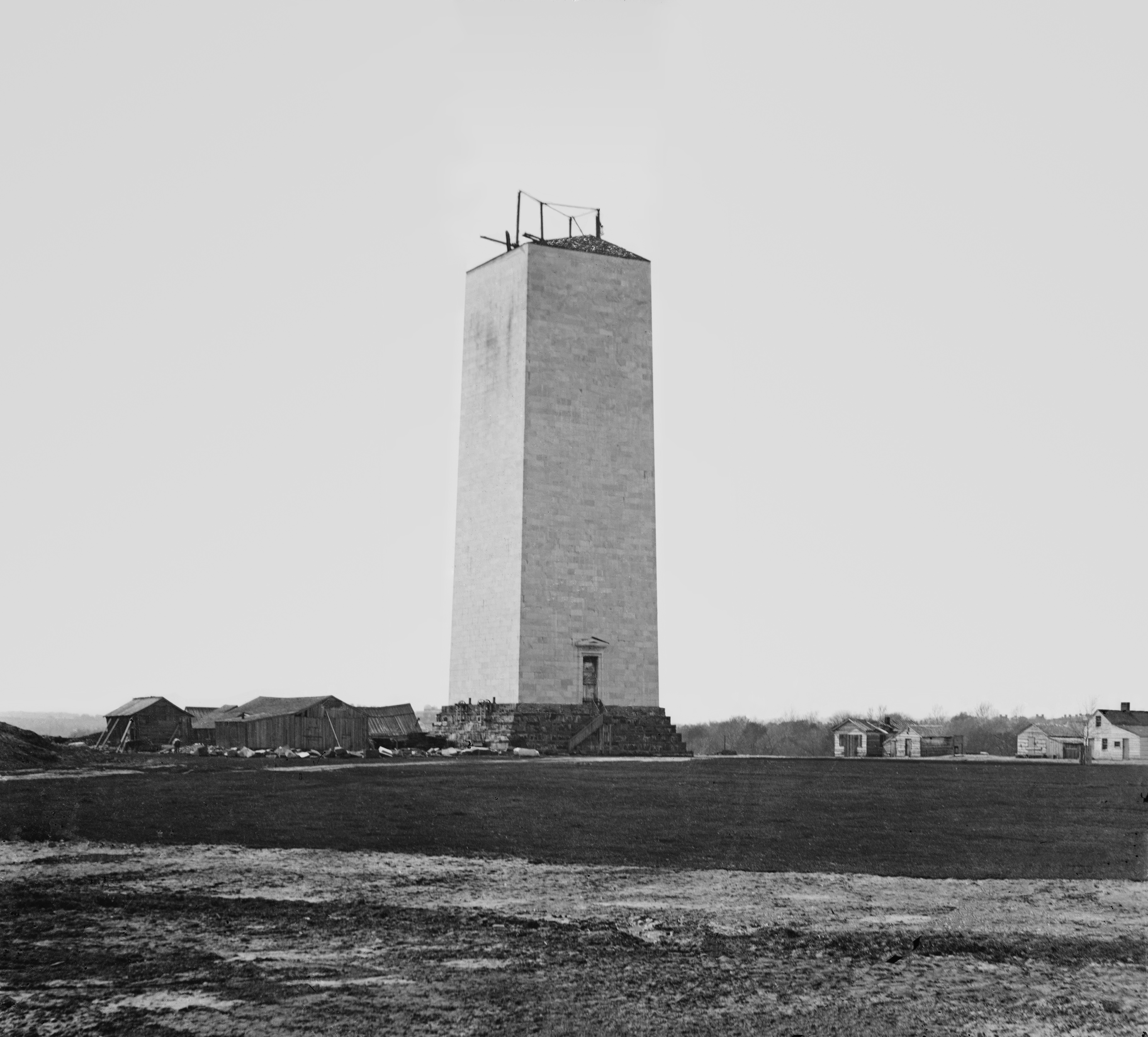
The Washington Monument stood in this unfinished form for 25 years before being completed in 1884. Upon its completion, it was the tallest man-made structure in the world.

On April 14, 1865, just days after the end of the Civil War, Lincoln was shot in Ford's Theatre by John Wilkes Booth during the play Our American Cousin. The next morning, at 7:22 am, President Lincoln died in the Petersen House across the street, the first American president to be assassinated. Following Lincoln's death, then Secretary of War Edwin M. Stanton said, "Now he belongs to the ages."

By 1870, the District's population had grown 75% from the previous census to nearly 132,000 residents. Despite the city's growth, Washington still had dirt roads and lacked basic sanitation. The situation was so bad that some members of Congress suggested moving the capital further west, but President Ulysses S. Grant refused to consider such a proposal.

In response to the poor conditions in the capital, Congress passed the Organic Act of 1871, which revoked the individual charters of the cities of Washington and Georgetown, and created a new territorial government for the whole District of Columbia. The act provided for a governor appointed by the President, a legislative assembly with an upper-house composed of eleven appointed council members and a 22-member house of delegates elected by residents of the District, as well as an appointed Board of Public Works charged with modernizing the city.

President Grant appointed Alexander Robey Shepherd, an influential member of the Board of Public Works, to the post of governor in 1873. Shepherd authorized large-scale municipal projects, which greatly modernized Washington. However, the governor spent three times the money that had been budgeted for capital improvements. He ultimately bankrupted the city. In 1874, Congress abolished the District's territorial government and replaced it with a three-member Board of Commissioners appointed by the President, of which one was a representative from the United States Army Corps of Engineers. The three Commissioners would then elect one of themselves to be president of the commission.

An additional act of Congress in 1878 made the three-member Board of Commissioners the permanent government of the District of Columbia. The act also had the effect of eliminating any remaining local institutions such as the boards on schools, health, and police. The Commissioners would maintain this form of direct rule for nearly a century.

The first motorized streetcars in the District began service in 1888 and spurred growth in areas beyond the City of Washington's original boundaries. In 1888, Congress required that all new developments within the District conform to the layout of the City of Washington. The City of Washington's northern border of Boundary Street was renamed Florida Avenue in 1890, reflecting growth of suburban areas in the County of Washington. The city's streets were extended throughout the District starting in 1893. An additional law passed in 1895 mandated that Washington formally absorb Georgetown, which until then had maintained a nominal separate identity, and renamed its streets. With a consolidated government and the transformation of suburban areas within the District into urban neighborhoods, the entire city eventually took on the name Washington, D.C.

In the early 1880s, the Washington City Canal was covered over. Originally an expansion of Tiber Creek, the canal connected the Capitol with the Potomac, running along the north side of the Mall where Constitution Avenue is today. However, as the nation transitioned over to railroads for its transport, the canal had become nothing more than a stagnant sewer, and so it was removed.

Some reminders of the canal still exist. South of the Capitol, a road named Canal Street connects Independence Avenue, SW, and E Street, SE (although the northernmost section of the street was renamed Washington Avenue to commemorate the state of Washington). A lock keeper's house built in 1835 at the eastern terminal of the C&O Canal (where the C&O emptied into Tiber Creek and the Potomac River) remains at the southwest corner of Constitution Avenue, NW, (formerly B Street, NW) and 17th Street, NW (see: Lockkeeper's House, C & O Canal Extension). The western end of the City Canal emptied into the Potomac and connected with the C&O Canal near the lock keeper's house.

One of the most important Washington architects of this period was the German immigrant Adolf Cluss. From the 1860s to the 1890s, he constructed over 80 public and private buildings throughout the city, including the National Museum, the Agriculture Department, Sumner and Franklin schools.

The Washington Monument, a tribute to George Washington and the world's tallest stone structure, was completed in 1884.

== 20th century ==
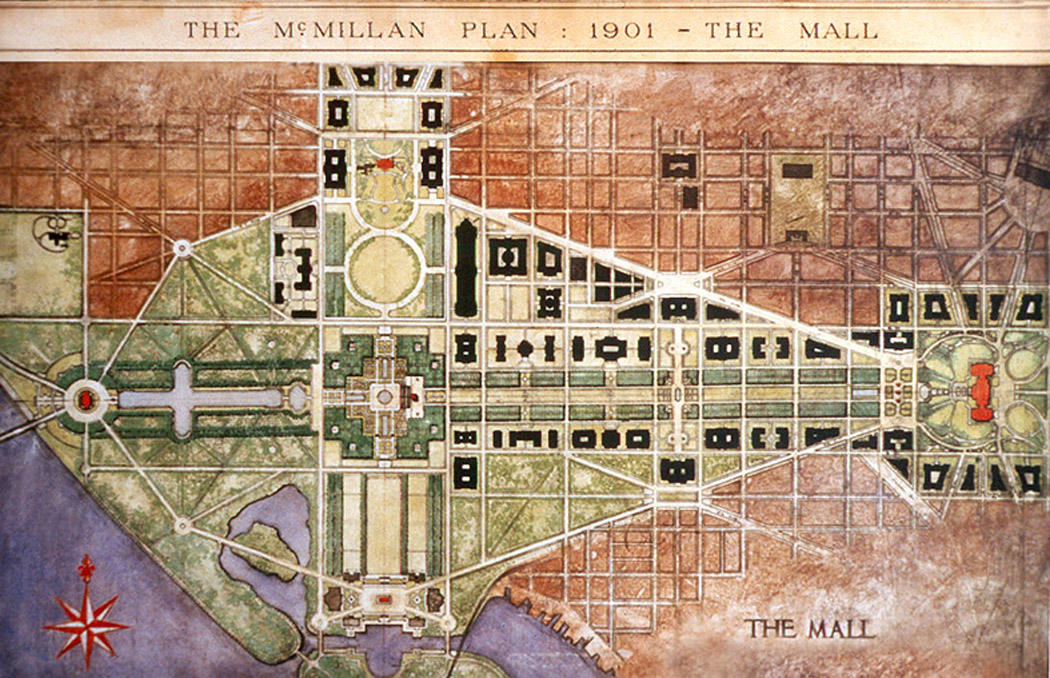
The National Mall, including a central pathway through it, the centerpiece of the 1901 McMillan Plan

The view down Pennsylvania Avenue in 1908

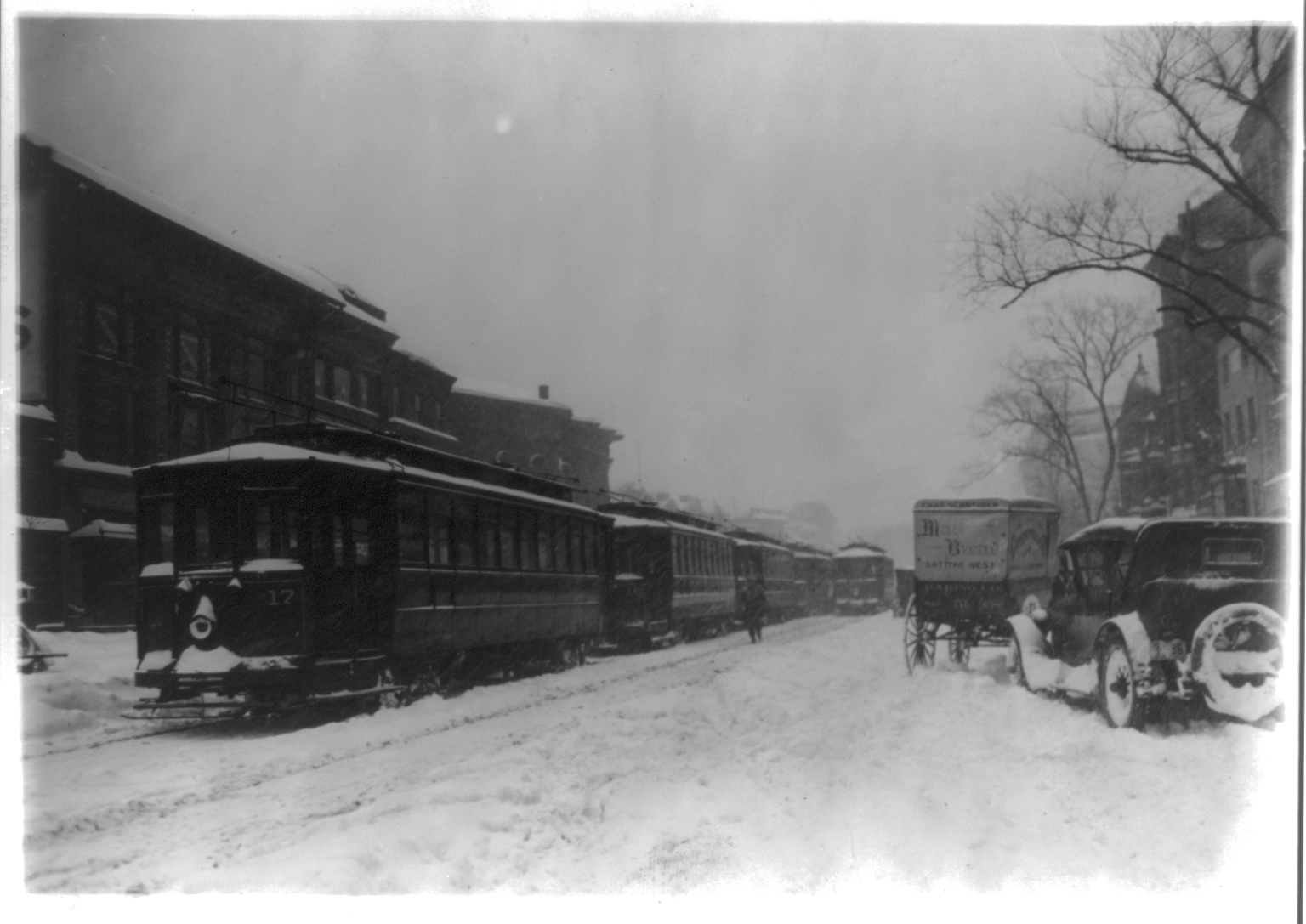
Street cars carrying passengers in January 1922

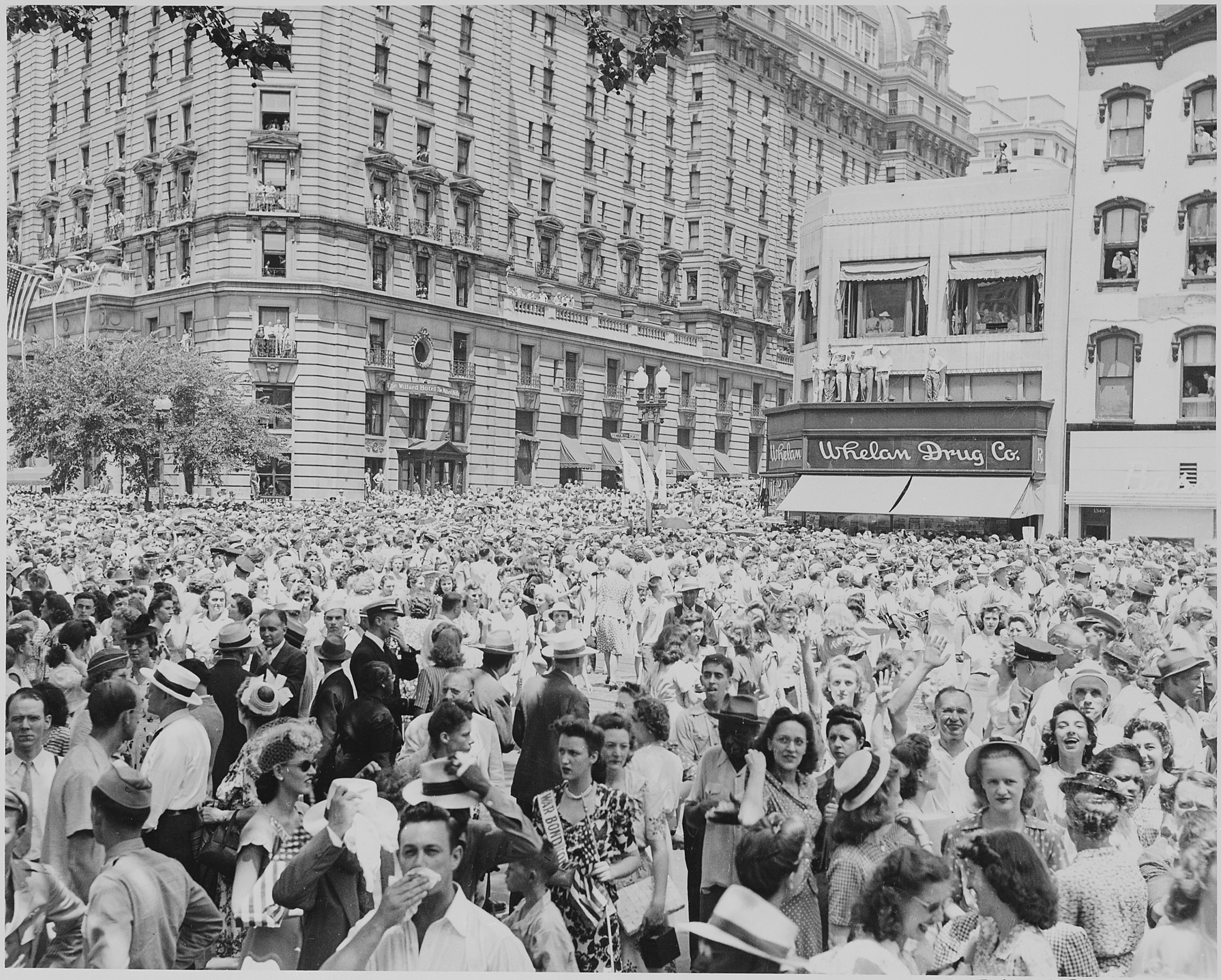
General Dwight D. Eisenhower received a hero's welcome in the city in June 1945 following the Allied victory in World War II

In 1901, the Senate Park Improvement Commission of the District of Columbia, known as the McMillan Commission, which Congress had formed the previous year, formulated the McMillan Plan, an architectural plan for the redevelopment of the National Mall. The commission was inspired by L'Enfant's 1791 plan for the city, which had not been fully realized. The members of the commission also sought to emulate the grandeur of European capitals such as Paris, London, and Rome. They were also strongly influenced by the City Beautiful movement, a Progressive ideology that intended to build civic virtue in the poor through important, monumental architecture. Several of the Commission members, including Daniel Burnham and Frederick Law Olmsted Jr. had in fact participated in the 1893 World Columbian Exposition, which was widely popular and helped to spread interest in the City Beautiful movement.

The McMillan Plan, in many respects, was an early form of urban renewal that removed many of the slums that surrounded the United States Capitol, replacing them with new public monuments and government buildings. The plan proposed a redesign of the National Mall and the construction of the future Burnham-designed Washington Union Station. World War I interrupted the execution of the plan, but construction of the Lincoln Memorial in 1922 largely completed it.

Although the McMillan Plan resulted in the demolition of some slums in the Federal Triangle area, substandard housing was a much larger problem in the city during the early 1900s, with large portions of the population living in so-called "alley dwellings." Progressive efforts eventually led to the creation of the Alley Dwelling Authority in 1934. The agency, led by John Ihlder, was an early example of a public housing agency, and was responsible for demolishing slum housing and building new units that were affordable, modern, and sanitary.

During his first administration, which started in 1913, President Woodrow Wilson introduced segregation into several federal departments, for the first time since 1863. He supported some cabinet appointees in their request to segregate employees and create separate lunchrooms and restrooms. He was highly criticized for this, especially as he had attracted numerous votes from blacks. The policy held for decades.

One quirk of federal rule over the District of Columbia was that the public school teachers were considered federal workers. Although the schools were segregated, black and white teachers were paid on an equal scale. The system attracted highly qualified teachers, especially for the M Street School, later called Dunbar High School, the academic high school for African Americans.

In July 1919, whites, including uniformed U.S. Armed Forces sailors and soldiers, attacked blacks in Washington during Red Summer, when violence broke out in cities across the country. The catalyst in Washington was the rumored arrest of a black man for rape; in four days of mob violence, whites randomly beat black people on the street and pulled others off streetcars for attacks. When police refused to intervene, the black population fought back. Troops tried to restore order as the city closed saloons and theaters, but a summer rainstorm had a more dampening effect. Fifteen people were killed: 10 whites, including two police officers, and five blacks. Fifty people were seriously wounded and another 100 less severely wounded. The NAACP protested to President Woodrow Wilson.

In 1922, Washington, D.C. was hit by its deadliest natural disaster when the Knickerbocker Storm dumped 18 inches (46 cm) of snow, causing the roof to collapse at the Knickerbocker Theater, a silent movie house. Ninety-eight people were killed, including a U.S. Congressman; 133 were injured.

On July 28, 1932, President Herbert Hoover ordered the United States Army to forcibly evict the "Bonus Army" of World War I veterans who gathered in Washington, D.C., to secure promised veterans' benefits early. U.S. troops dispersed the last of the "Bonus Army" the next day.

During the Great Depression of the 1930s, the city's population grew rapidly with the creation of additional federal agencies under the New Deal programs of President Franklin D. Roosevelt, during which most of the Federal Triangle buildings were constructed.

In the late 1930s, the chairman of the House Subcommittee on District Appropriations Ross A. Collins from Mississippi cut spending on local Washington, D.C. funds for welfare and education, saying, "my constituents wouldn't stand for spending money on niggers".

World War II brought further population increases—more than 300,000 between 1940 and 1943—and a significant housing shortage, as existing residents were urged to rent rooms to the influx of Federal staffers who arrived from throughout the country. "It is a terrible place to live", Life magazine wrote in 1943; the city's infrastructure was unable to grow as fast as the population, and residents had to wait in long lines for food, transportation, shopping, entertainment, and almost every other area of life.

During World War II, as many as 200,000 railroad passengers passed through Washington Union Station in a single day. The Pentagon was built in nearby Arlington to efficiently consolidate Federal defense offices under one roof. One of the largest office buildings in the world, it was built rapidly during the early years of the war, partially opening in 1942 and complete in 1943.

=== Civil rights ===
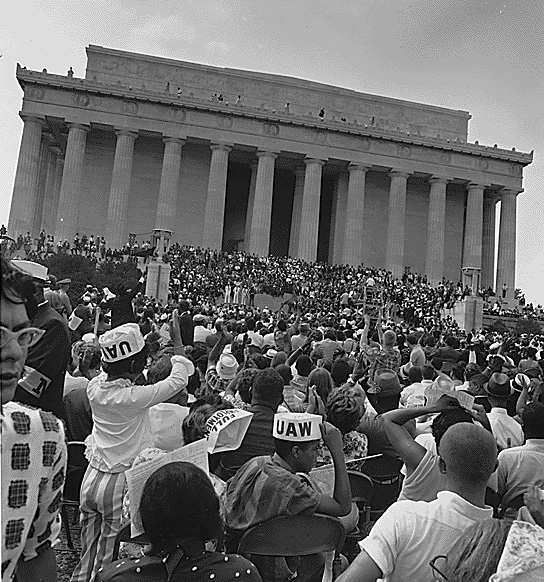
Civil rights marchers during the March on Washington at the Lincoln Memorial on August 28, 1963

The city experienced a brief intensification of racial segregation in 1944 after the appointment of Senator Theodore G. Bilbo, a radical segregationist Southern Democrat from Mississippi, as Chairman of the Senate Committee on the District of Columbia in 1944. Bilbo, who sought to transform the district into a "model city," strengthened segregation in the city's workplaces, parks, and National Airport. President Harry Truman ended de jure racial discrimination in the Armed Forces and federal workplaces in 1948. Parks and recreation facilities in Washington remained segregated by practice until 1954. Public schools were desegregated soon after.

When the city's Board of Education began building the John Philip Sousa Junior High, a group of parents from the Anacostia neighborhood petitioned to have the school admit black and white students. When it was constructed, the board declared that only whites could enroll. The parents sued in a case decided in the landmark Supreme Court ruling Bolling v. Sharpe. Partly due to the District's unique status under the Constitution, the court decided unanimously that all of D.C.'s public schools had to be integrated. In the wake of this and the landmark 1954 Supreme Court case Brown v. Board of Education, the Eisenhower administration decided to make D.C. schools the first to integrate, as an example to the rest of the nation.

In 1957, Washington, D.C. became the first major city in the nation with a majority African-American population. Like many cities, it had received thousands of black people from the South in the Great Migration, starting during World War I and accelerating in the 1940s and 1950s. With the buildup of government and defense industries during World War II, many new residents found jobs. In the postwar years, whites who were better established economically began to move to newer housing in adjoining states in the suburbanization movement that occurred around most major cities. They were aided by the extensive highway construction undertaken by federal and state governments.

On August 28, 1963, Washington, D.C. took a center role in the Civil rights movement with the March on Washington for Jobs and Freedom and Martin Luther King Jr.'s famed "I Have a Dream" speech at the Lincoln Memorial. Following King's assassination on April 4, 1968, in Memphis, Washington was devastated by the riots that broke out in the U Street neighborhood and spread to other black areas, including Columbia Heights. The civil unrest drove many whites and middle-class blacks to move out of the city core. There had already been a steady movement of some residents to suburban locations searching for newer housing and avoiding school integration. In the late 1960s and early 1970s, many businesses left the downtown and inner-city areas, drawn to suburban malls and following residential development. Marks of riots scarred some neighborhoods into the late 1990s.

=== Home rule ===
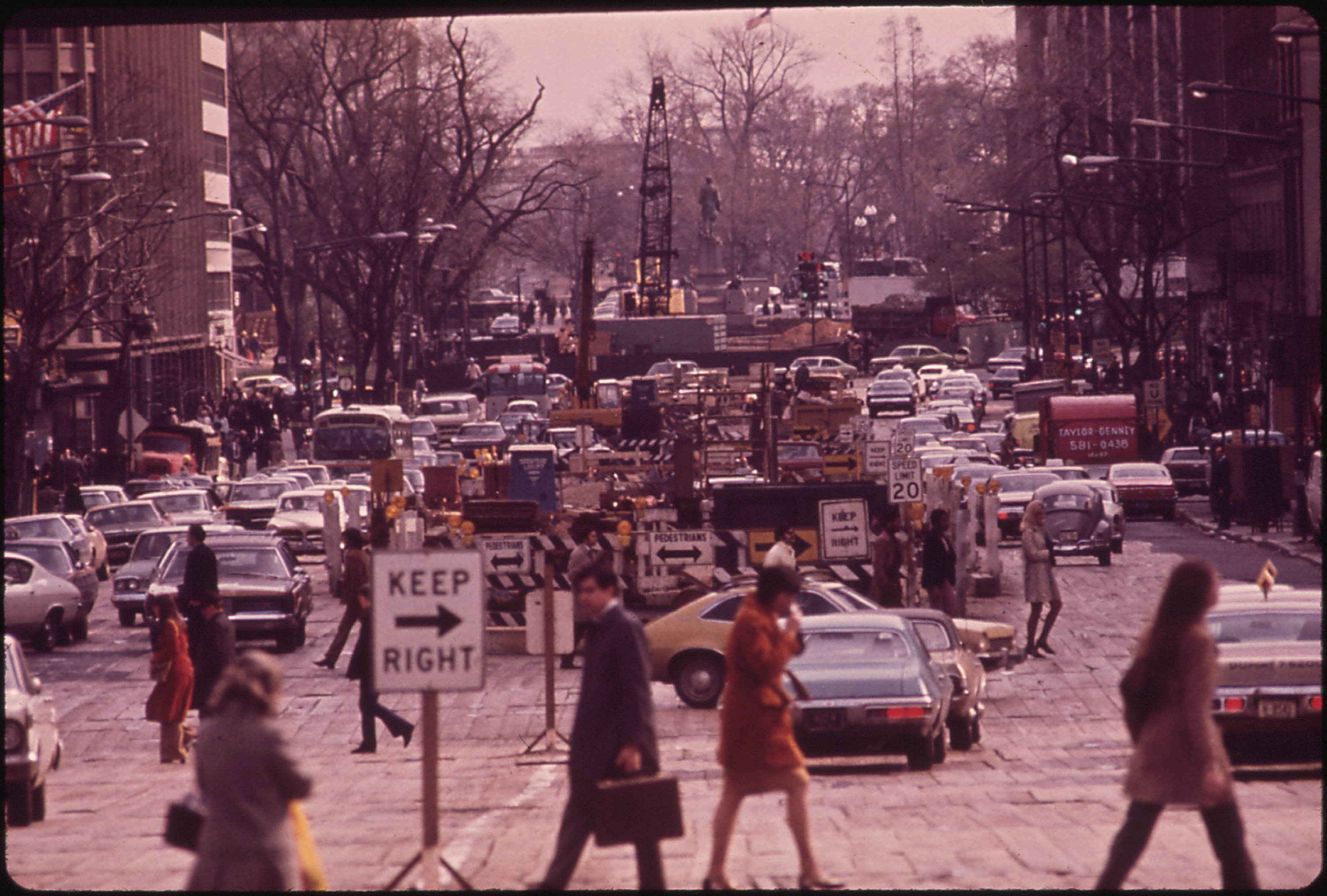
Construction of the Washington Metro on Connecticut Avenue in 1973

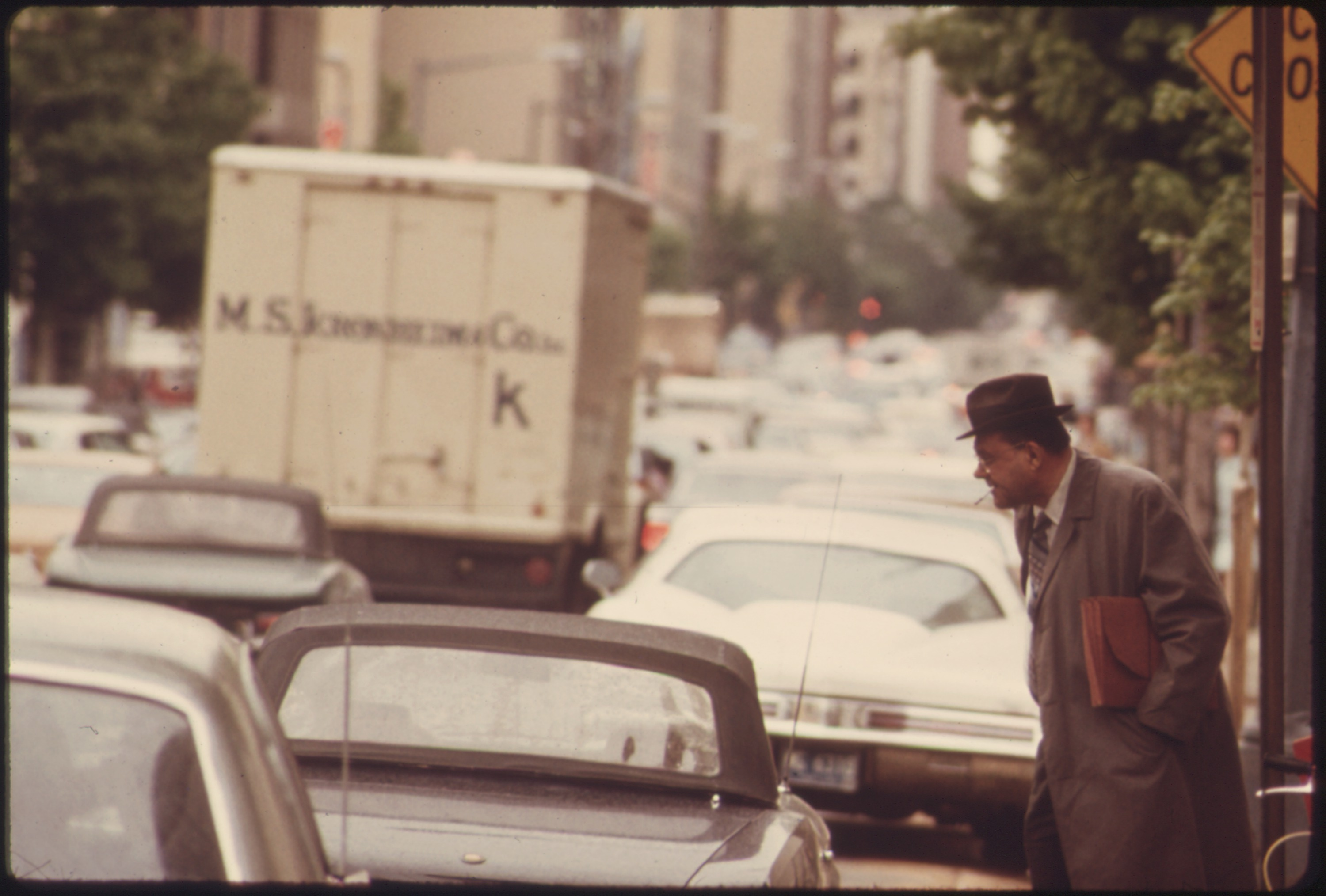
A major bus strike in May 1974 caused huge traffic jams throughout the city

The District elects a delegate to the House of Representatives who has the usual rights of House membership, such as seniority and committee membership, except that the delegate cannot formally vote. The Twenty-third Amendment to the United States Constitution, ratified on March 29, 1961, gives the people a voice in the electoral college of the size of the smallest state (three votes).

In 1973, Congress passed the District of Columbia Home Rule Act, ceding some of its power over the city to a new, directly elected city council and mayor. Walter Washington became the first elected mayor of Washington, D.C.

The first 4.6 miles (7.4 km) of the Washington Metro subway system opened on March 27, 1976, following years of acrimonious battles with Congress over funding and highway construction, including a rejected proposal to build a north-central freeway. The Washington Metropolitan Area Transit Authority was created in 1973 through a merger of several local bus companies. Several new Metro stations such as Friendship Heights, Van Ness, Gallery Place, Columbia Heights, U Street, and Navy Yard – Ballpark eventually became catalysts for commercial development. The John F. Kennedy Center for the Performing Arts opened in 1971. Around the same time, several new museums and historical monuments opened on and around the National Mall.

In 1978 Congress sent the District of Columbia Voting Rights Amendment to the states for ratification. This amendment would have granted the District representation in the House, Senate, and Electoral College as if it were a state. The proposed amendment had a seven-year limit for ratification, and only sixteen states ratified it in this period.

The city's local government, particularly during the mayoralty of Marion Barry, was criticized for mismanagement and waste. Barry defeated incumbent mayor Walter Washington in the 1978 Democratic Party primary. Barry was then elected mayor, serving three successive four-year terms. During his administration in 1989, The Washington Monthly magazine claimed that the District had "the worst city government in America". After being imprisoned for six months on misdemeanor drug charges in 1990, Barry did not run for reelection. In 1991, Sharon Pratt Kelly became the first black woman to lead a major U.S. city.

Barry was elected again in 1994 and by the next year the city had become nearly insolvent. In 1995, Congress created the District of Columbia Financial Control Board to oversee all municipal spending and rehabilitate the city government. Mayor Anthony Williams won election in 1998. His administration oversaw a period of greater prosperity, urban renewal, and budget surpluses. The District regained control over its finances in 2001 and the oversight board's operations were suspended in September of that year.

Williams did not seek reelection in 2006. Councilmember Adrian Fenty defeated Council Chairwoman Linda Cropp in that year's Democratic primary race to succeed Williams as mayor and started his term in 2007. Shortly upon taking office, Fenty won approval from the city council to directly manage and overhaul the city's under-performing public school system. However, Fenty lost a Democratic Party primary to former Council Chair Vincent Gray in August 2010. Mayor Gray won the general election and assumed office in January 2011 with a pledge to bring economic opportunities to more of the city's residents and under-served areas.

== 21st century ==
=== Terrorism and security ===
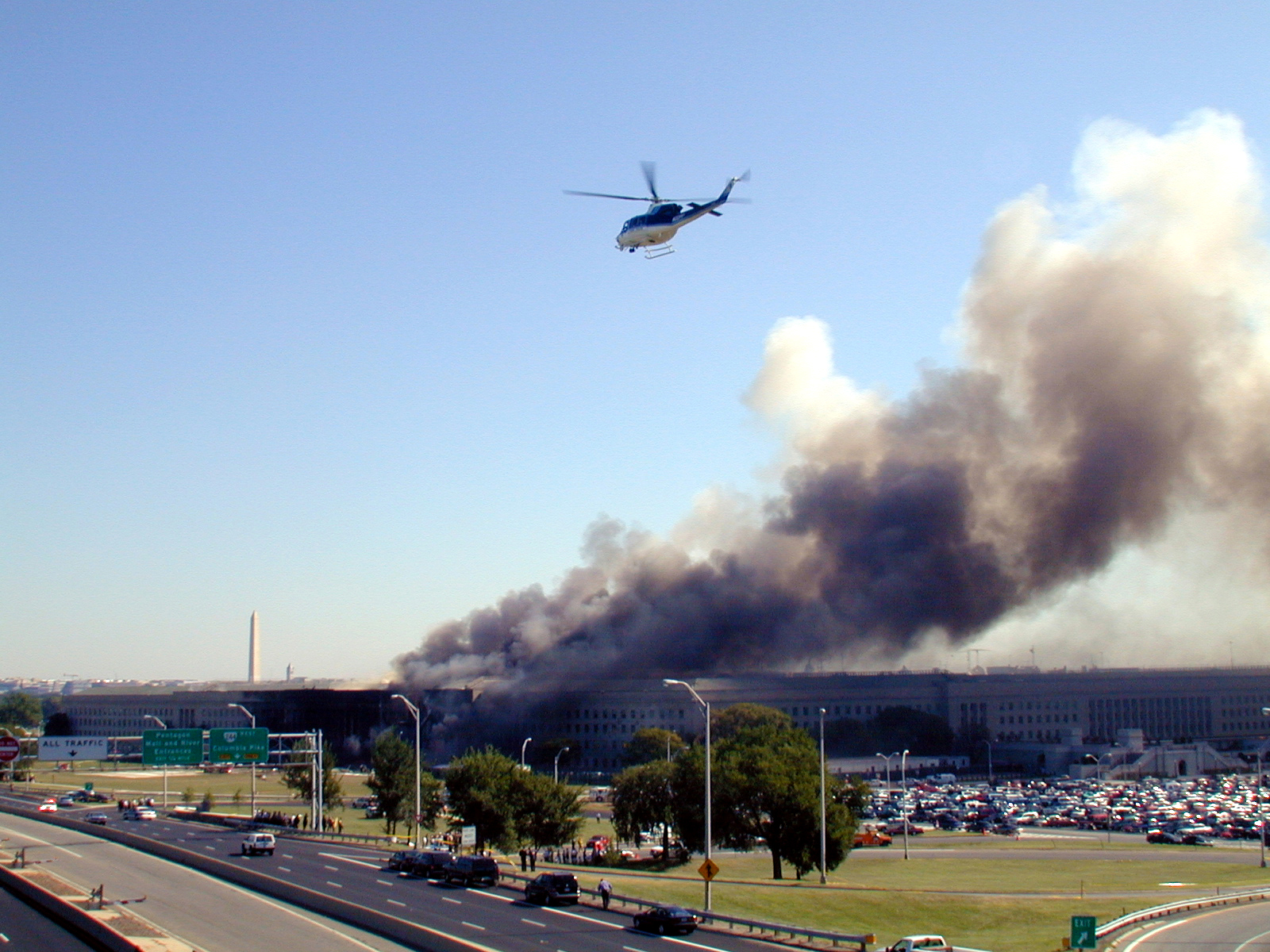
The Pentagon following the September 11 attacks with the Washington Monument visible in the background

The Washington metropolitan area was a main target of the September 11 attacks. American Airlines Flight 77 was hijacked by five Islamist terrorists and flew into the Pentagon in Arlington County, Virginia, just across the Potomac River from Washington, killing 125 people inside the building, as well as 64 on board the airliner, including the five terrorists. United Airlines Flight 93, which was also hijacked and which went down in an open field near Shanksville, Pennsylvania, supposedly intended to target either the White House or United States Capitol.

Since September 11, 2001, several high-profile incidents and security scares have occurred in Washington. In October 2001, anthrax attacks, involving anthrax-contaminated mail sent to numerous members of Congress, infected 31 staff members and killed two U.S. Postal Service employees who handled the contaminated mail at the Brentwood sorting facility. An FBI and DOJ investigation determined the likely culprit of the anthrax attacks to be Bruce Edwards Ivins, a scientist, but he committed suicide in July 2008 before formal charges were filed.

During three weeks of October 2002, fear spread among residents of the Washington area during the Beltway Sniper attacks. Ten apparently random victims were killed, with three others wounded, before John Allen Muhammad and Lee Boyd Malvo were arrested on October 24, 2002.

In 2003 and 2004, a serial arsonist set over 40 fires, mainly in Washington, D.C. and the close-in Maryland suburbs, with one fire killing an older woman. A local man was arrested in the serial arson case in April 2005 and pleaded guilty.

The toxin ricin was found in the mailroom of the White House in November 2003 and in the mailroom of U.S. Senate Majority Leader Bill Frist in February 2004.

After the September 11 attacks, security was increased in Washington. Screening devices for biological agents, metal detectors, and vehicle barriers became more commonplace at office buildings as well as government buildings. After the 2004 Madrid train bombings, local authorities decided to test explosives detectors on the vulnerable Washington Metro subway system.

When U.S. forces in Pakistan raided a house suspected of being a terrorist hideout, they found information several years old about planned attacks on Washington, D.C., New York City, and Newark, New Jersey. It was directed to intelligence officials. On August 1, 2004, the Secretary of Homeland Security put the city on Orange (High) Alert. A few days later, security checkpoints appeared in and around the Capitol Hill and Foggy Bottom neighborhoods, and fences were erected on monuments once freely accessible, such as the United States Capitol. Tours of the White House were limited to those arranged by members of Congress. Screening devices for biological agents, metal detectors, and vehicle barriers became more common at office buildings as well as government buildings and in transportation facilities. This ultra-tight security was referred to as "Fortress Washington"; many people objected to "walling off Washington" based on information several years old. The vehicle inspections set up around the U.S. Capitol were removed in November 2004.

=== Washington Navy Yard shooting ===
On September 16, 2013, the Washington Navy Yard shooting occurred when lone gunman Aaron Alexis fatally shot twelve people and injured three others in a mass shooting at the headquarters of the Naval Sea Systems Command (NAVSEA) inside the Washington Navy Yard in the Southeast quadrant of the city. The attack, which took place in the Navy Yard's Building 197, began around 8:20 am. EDT and ended when Alexis was killed by police around 9:20 am. EDT. It was the second-deadliest mass murder on a U.S. military base, behind only the Fort Hood shooting in November 2009.

=== Statehood movement ===
On November 8, 2016, Washington voters were asked to advise the council to approve or reject a proposal, which included advising the council to petition Congress to admit the District as the 51st State and approve a constitution and boundaries for the new state. The voters of the District of Columbia voted overwhelmingly to advise the council to approve the proposal, with 86% of voters voting to advise approving the proposal. Challenges, including Republican opposition in Congress and constitutional issues, continue to cause problems for the movement.

=== January 6 United States Capitol attack ===
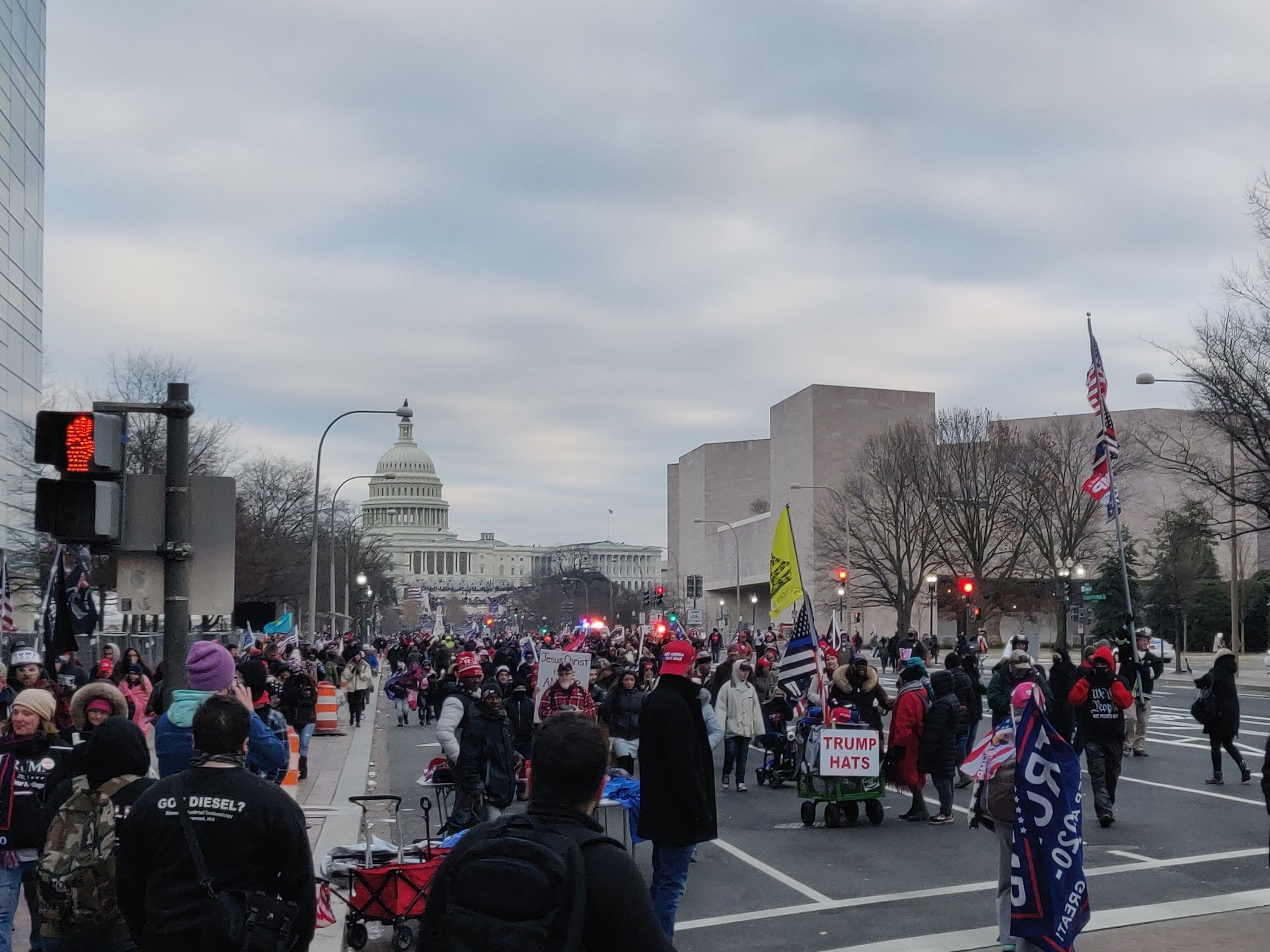
Demonstrators marching down Pennsylvania Avenue towards the United States Capitol on January 6, 2021

In 2021, right-wing demonstrators gathered at a rally in support of President Donald Trump during his alleged attempts to overturn the 2020 United States presidential election attacked the United States Capitol in an effort to prevent Congress from certifying the election's Electoral College results and Trump's rival Joe Biden's victory.

=== 2025 Federal takeover ===
On August 11, 2025, President Donald Trump switched control of the Metropolitan Police Department of the District of Columbia from the city government of Washington, D.C., to the federal government, invoking section 740 of the District of Columbia Home Rule Act. Trump also deployed federal law enforcement agencies and the District of Columbia National Guard in response to "rampant crime" in the city.

== Changing demographics ==
New migration patterns have appeared. Washington has a steadily declining black population, due to many African Americans' leaving the city for suburbs. At the same time, the city's Caucasian and Hispanic populations have steadily increased. Since 2000 there has been a 7.3% decrease in the African-American population, and a 17.8% increase in the white population. In addition, many African Americans are going to the South in a New Great Migration, because of family ties, increased opportunities and lower cost of living.

== See also ==
- Historical outline of the District of Columbia
- List of incidents of political violence in Washington, D.C.
- List of rallies and protest marches in Washington, D.C.
- Reportedly haunted locations in Washington, D.C.
- Timeline of Washington, D.C.
- Architecture of Washington, D.C.
