= Territory of Columbia =

The Territory of Columbia or Columbia Territory may refer to:

- The District of Columbia from its establishment in 1791 until 1801; see History of Washington, D.C. § Establishment
- The proposed name for the Territory of Washington (later the U.S. State of Washington) before its formation in 1853
- A 1860s proposal for a U.S. territory to be formed in the Inland Northwest, parts of what is now eastern Washington, northern Idaho, and western Montana
