= Newspaper Row (Washington, D.C.) =

Street in Washington D.C.

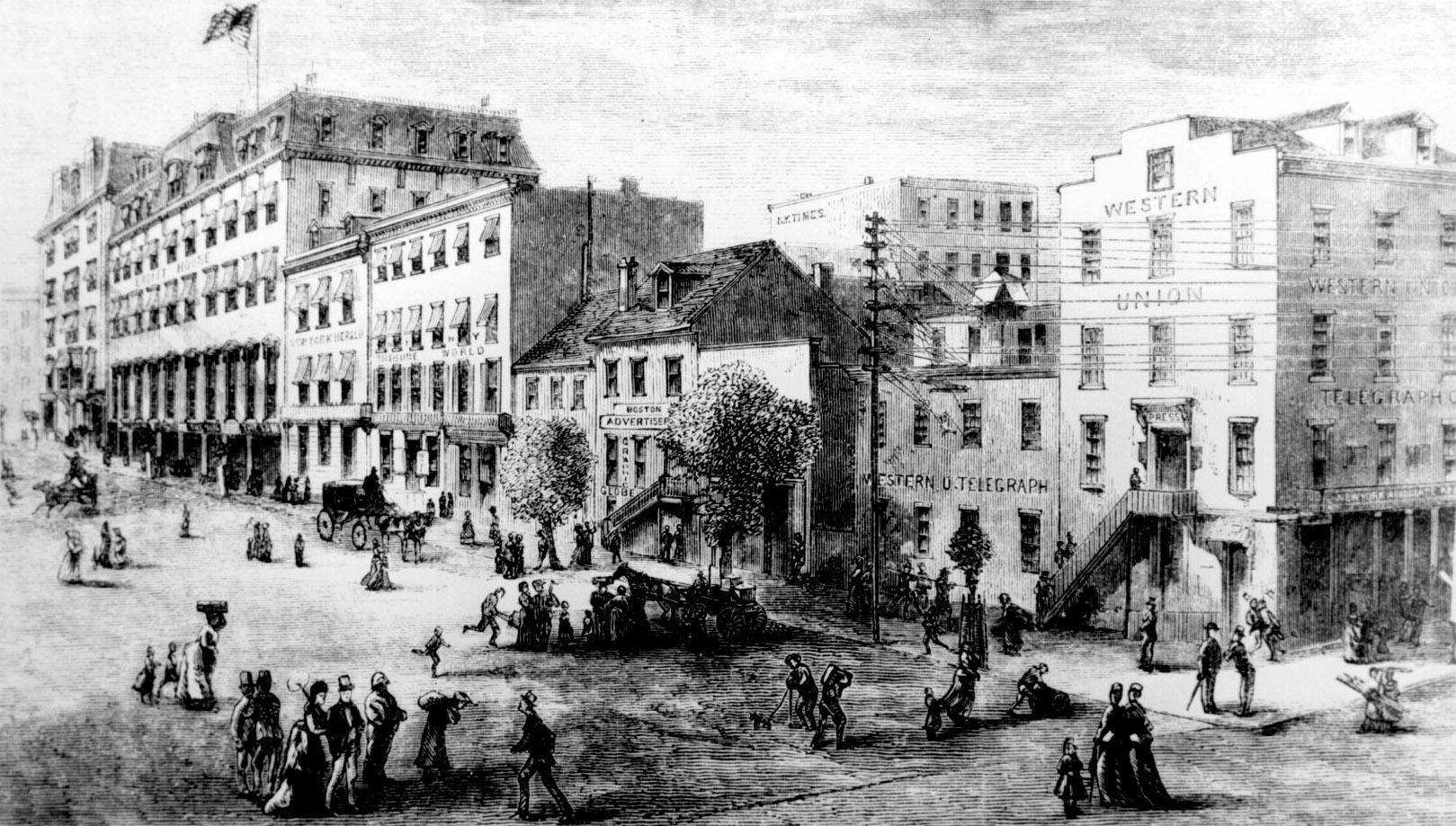
Washington D.C.'s Newspaper Row

Newspaper Row was a district of Washington D.C., on the corner of 14th Street Northwest and Pennsylvania Avenue. Historian Paul Dickinson said the area “was sort of the center of the nation’s news gathering.” The area got its start when Western Union opened a telegraph station in the 1850s. Many newspapers, including The New York Times, New York World, The Boston Advertiser, The New York Tribune, The Baltimore Sun and The Washington Post had offices, or were based there. The National Press Building was built in the district in 1926, to consolidate the departments of the newspapers into one building. When the National Press Building moved, most of the newspapers left the district as well.
