= City of Washington from Beyond the Navy Yard =

1833 painting by George Cooke

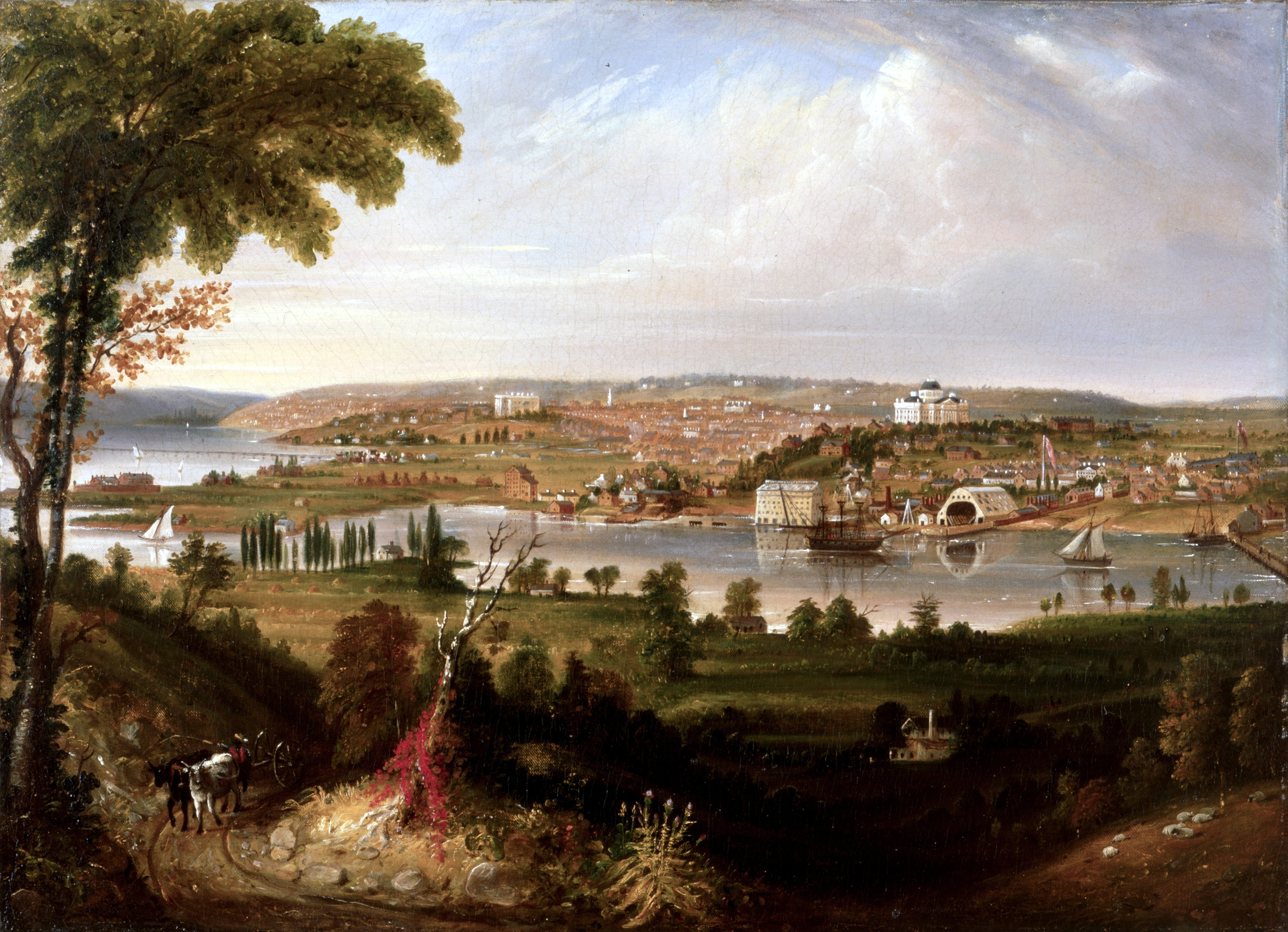

The City of Washington from Beyond the Navy Yard is an 1833 oil painting by the American painter George Cooke.

The painting shows a view of Washington, D.C. from Anacostia, across the Anacostia River. To the right of centre are the United States Capitol atop Capitol Hill, and the Washington Navy Yard, with two dry docks, in front of which is anchored a three-masted sailing vessel. To the left are the Washington Arsenal and White House, depicted larger than life to balance the Capitol building.

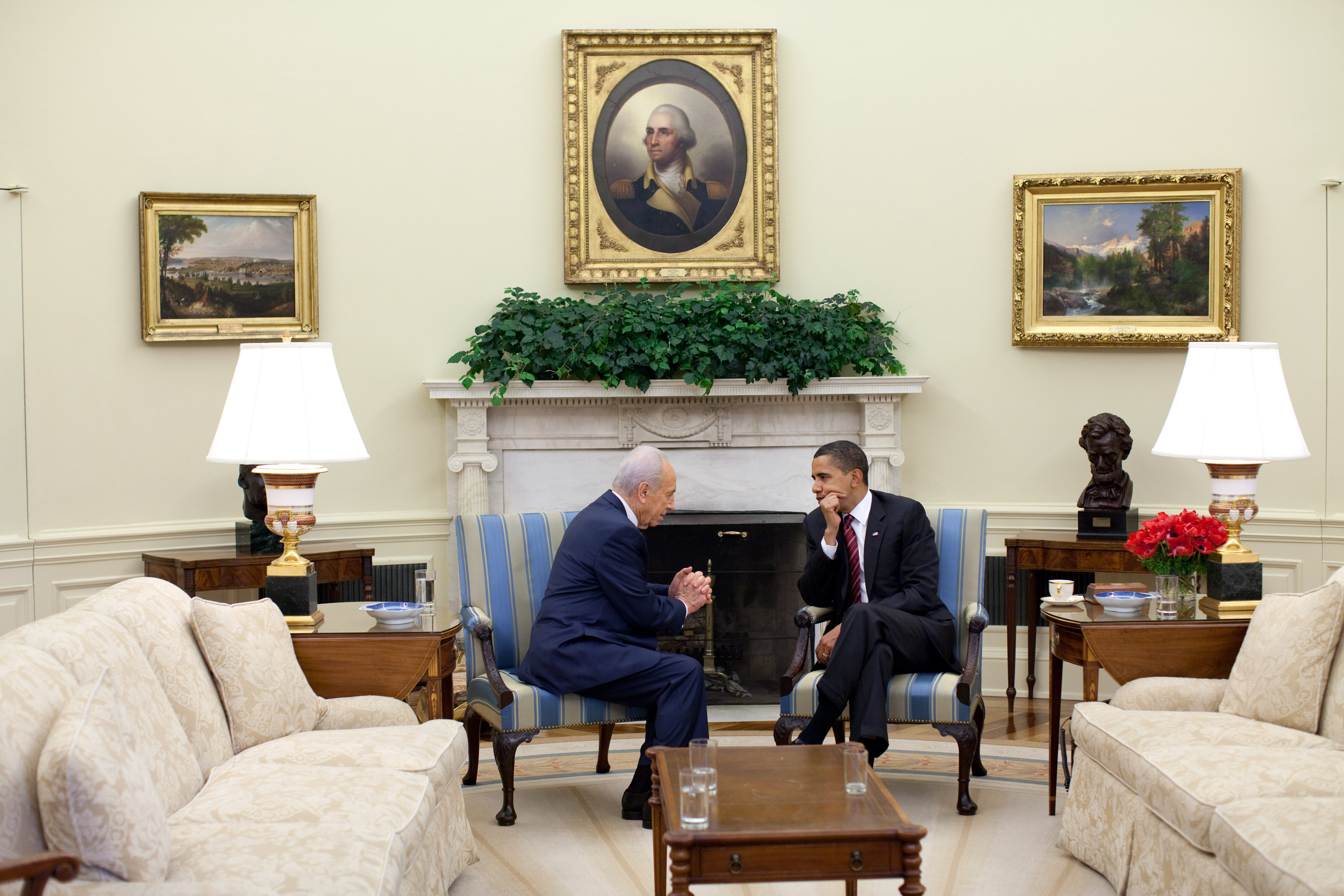
Barack Obama meets Shimon Peres in the Oval Office. Cooke's painting is on display to the left of Peale's Porthole Portrait of George Washington (1795)

The city around and between the main buildings is low rise, with two and three story houses. Further left is the Potomac River, and several smaller vessels are sailing on the two rivers. In the largely agricultural foreground are a few small buildings, a cart, a field with mounds of hay, and some sheep.

Since 1972, the painting has been in the White House collections and has subsequently been displayed in the Oval Office under various administrations. It was displayed under the then-current and the next two administrations—Gerald Ford, Jimmy Carter, and Ronald Reagan. It was removed by George H. W. Bush but returned under Bill Clinton and George W. Bush. The painting remained on view in the Oval Office during the Obama administration.

== See also ==
- Art in the White House
