= Presbyterian Burying Ground =

Cemetery in Washington, D.C, United States

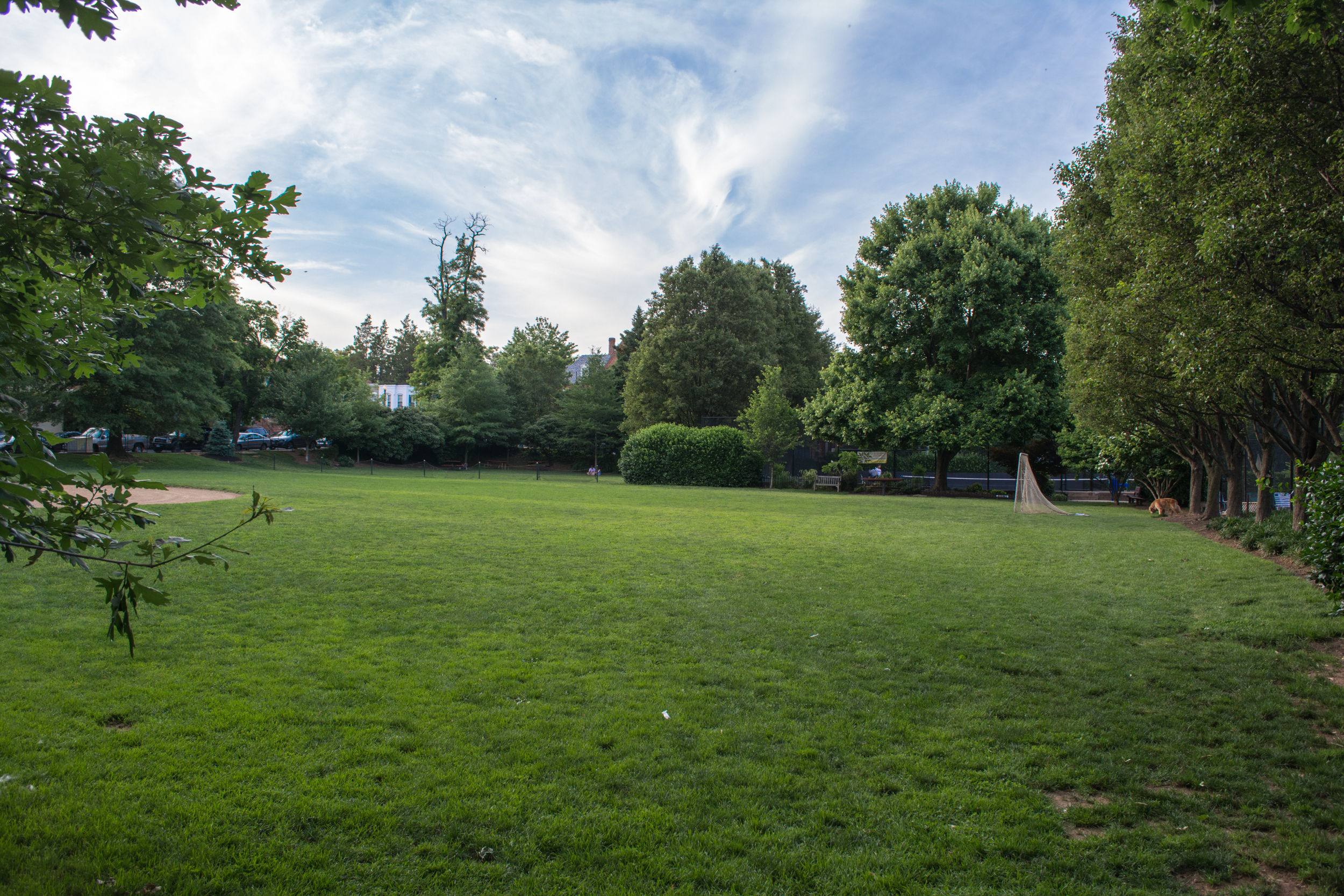
- Presbyterian Burying Ground in 2014
- Interactive map of Presbyterian Burying Ground

Details
- Established: August 22, 1802
- Location: Georgetown, Washington, D.C., U.S.
- Country: United States
- Coordinates: 38.91224°N 77.067077°W
- Type: Closed 1887; demolished August 1909
- Owned by: Georgetown Presbyterian Church
- Size: 400 by 350 feet (120 by 110 m) (3.2 acres (13,000 m^{2}))
- No. of graves: about 2,700

The Presbyterian Burying Ground, also known as the Old Presbyterian Burying Ground, was a historic cemetery which existed between 1802 and 1909 in the Georgetown neighborhood of Washington, D.C., in the United States. It was one of the most prominent cemeteries in the city until the 1860s. Burials there tapered significantly after Oak Hill Cemetery was founded nearby in 1848.

In 1887, the Presbyterian Burying Ground closed to new burials. After an attempt was made in 1891 to demolish the cemetery and use the land for housing, about 500 to 700 bodies were disinterred. The remaining graves fell into extensive disrepair. After a decade of effort, the District of Columbia purchased the cemetery in 1909 and built Volta Park there, leaving nearly 2,000 bodies buried at the site. Occasional human remains and tombstones have been discovered at the park since its construction. A number of figures important in the early history of Georgetown and Washington, D.C., military figures, politicians, merchants, and others were buried at Presbyterian Burying Ground.

== History ==
=== 18th century ===
In 1780, Reverend Stephen Bloomer Balch established the Presbyterian Congregation in Georgetown, now known as Georgetown Presbyterian Church. (Note: Georgetown Presbyterian Church has had several names over the years, including Presbyterian Church of George-Town, Presbyterian Church of Georgetown, Bridge Street Presbyterian Church, West Presbyterian Church, West Side Presbyterian Church, and West Street Presbyterian Church.) The new Presbyterian congregation originally met in a local home, but in 1782 it built its first church home on the southeast corner of 30th and M Streets NW. It was the only Protestant church in the District of Columbia until 1805. The congregation grew swiftly, and the church was enlarged in 1793 and 1802.

=== 19th century ===
A small parish graveyard originally existed alongside the church, but it quickly filled to capacity. (Note: Tombstones and graves in this cemetery remained there at least until 1828, even though Georgetown Presbyterian Church moved to Washington Street at present-day 30th Street NW, and Bridge Street at present-day M Street NW. The graveyard remained where it was, however. The Bridge Street building was moved in 1873 to P Street and 31st Streets NW. Although most of the tombstones at the 30th and M graveyard were moved to Presbysterian Burying Ground in 1873, many of the bodies were not. They were dug up, placed in boxes, and stored in the basement of P Street church. Many of the boxes were opened by children over time, and the bodies desecrated. Some boys even played soccer with skulls in the street.)

The Presbyterian Burying Ground was established by Georgetown Presbyterian Church on August 22, 1802, in an area now bounded by 4th, 5th, Market and Frederick Streets (now Volta Place NW and P, 33rd, and 34th Streets NW). (Note: Pippenger gives the boundary of the cemetery as 33rd, 34th, Q, and R Streets. Street names in Georgetown were changed to conform to the street naming system in use in the Northwest quadrant of Washington, D.C., in 1895. At the time, Q Street NW was one city block north of R Street NW. However, in 1941, Q Street was renamed Volta Place; R Street was renamed Q Street; S Street was renamed Dent Place; T Street was renamed Reservoir Road; and U Street was renamed R Street. Pippenger uses the 1895-to-1940 designation of the street names when referring to the cemetery's boundaries.) Land for both the cemetery and a new Georgetown Presbyterian Church were donated by Dr. Charles Beatty, who provided a building lot of 1,500 square feet (140 m^{2}) on the block. Beatty required that the property be used for either a church or a cemetery, and that the property should revert to Beatty's heirs if not used for either purpose. (Furthermore, the act of Congress of March 28, 1806, under which Georgetown Presbyterian Church was incorporated stipulated that the graveyard could not be used for any other purpose or disposed of.) Dr. Beatty also donated a building lot on the block to the Methodist Episcopal Church, but this land became an annex of cemetery when the Methodists declined to build there. Dr. Beatty soon donated six more lots to Georgetown Presbyterian for use as a cemetery, giving the grounds a little over 3 acres (12,000 m^{2}). The burying ground (the term "cemetery" did not come into use until mid-century) was located in a middle-class neighborhood. On the south side of 4th Street in the southeast corner were the "20 Buildings"—two-story brick rowhouses constructed by Scottish workers who labored on the construction of the United States Capitol.

Presbyterian Burying Ground was laid out simply, similar to most cemeteries of the day. The cemetery had two gravel paths, lined with fir trees, one which bisected the grounds east–west and another which extended from 4th Street north to the center of the block. The main entrance was in the east on Market Street. Black locust trees were planted about the grounds. A winding, somewhat circular path occupied the intersection of the two fir-lined gravel walkways. No other footpaths were laid out, however, and access to most graves, vaults, and mausoleums were via informal dirt ruts in the lawn. Vandals and children were kept out by a high wooden fence.

A church was erected in 1855 on the east side of the property in the middle of the block. Sources differ as to its height (one or two stories) and its adornment (play or Gothic Revival). It contained high-back pews and a high pulpit, and served as Georgetown Presbyterian Church's primary place of worship. After the congregation erected a new church home in 1821, this small brick structure served as the cemetery chapel. (Note: There is some lack of clarity among sources as to where the chapel was located. However, the southwest corner can be ruled out because Georgetown Presbyterian Church considered that "empty land" and in 1896 thought it might build a church there.)

According to the Washington Federalist newspaper, "lots at present will be sold low for cash in order to defray present expenses, but when these are discharged they will rise much higher in price." Interments began almost immediately, due to the low prices the church offered, and the cemetery was instantly popular. Most of the graves were in the northern half of the cemetery, which sloped gently downward to Q Street. Families erected small headstones and, later, large funerary monuments. Some private brick mausoleums were constructed, and the church itself built a burial vault (for those who wanted above-ground burial but without the cost of erecting their own tomb) "near a corner" of the cemetery. The exact location of this "public vault is unknown. The largest mausoleums in the cemetery were erected by the Kincaids, a large and wealthy Georgetown family, and the Kurtzes, a banking and insurance family. The burying ground attracted most of Georgetown's aristocratic families, including the Campbells and Morfeats (families who founded the town) and the Eastburns. By some counts, there were more than 70 above-ground mausoleums. But the Presbyterian Burying Ground was not just for the wealthy. It became the primary cemetery for all Georgetown residents. Many middle-class families built vaults for their loved ones. These were single or double-wide graves, usually lined with brick, into which one or more bodies were interred. The vault had a marble or brick lid, usually raised up off the ground by three or four courses. Many vaults were 3 to 4 feet (0.91 to 1.22 m) high, and surrounded by brick walls 5 to 9 feet (1.5 to 2.7 m) high. At the cemetery's height, there were more than 100 vaults at Presbyterian Burying Ground. (Note: According to reports, vaulted yards still in existence in 1901 ranged in size from 16 square feet (1.5 m^{2}) to 8 square feet (0.74 m^{2}) to 7 square feet (0.65 m^{2}) in size.)

The Presbyterian Burying Ground was, in its prime, considered beautiful and a socially desirable place for interment. The cemetery "was one of the prettiest to be found anywhere", said The Washington Post. In the 1840s and 1850s, it was considered the equal of Oak Hill or Glenwood in terms of its beauty and social standing. "During its day the cemetery was [also] looked upon as the most select in the District." The Reverend Thomas Bloomer Balch said that the cemetery was, from its inception into the 1860s, a symbol of "the pride and wealth and glory of aristocratic Georgetown".

== Operational history of the cemetery ==
Burials began at the cemetery in 1806. (Note: Historian Wesley E. Pippenger disagrees the date of the first burial can be established, as many early records were destroyed in a fire in 1831.) In January 1812, lots in the northwest corner of the cemetery were set aside for the burial of African Americans.

Although Presbyterian Burying Ground was beautiful, it did not retain its popularity for long. In 1807, the 35.75-acre (144,700 m^{2}) Congressional Cemetery was established on the east side of the city on the shores of the Anacostia River. Despite being one of the largest cemeteries in the District of Columbia, Presbyterian Burying Ground quickly came to be seen as too small and crowded to permit the construction of the large funerary monuments favored by Americans in the Victorian era. Large, open Congressional Cemetery, however, provided ample land for memorials. As Congressional Cemetery grew in popularity, the Presbyterian Burying Ground fell into disrepair. By 1847, thickets of weeds and shrubs had taken over the cemetery. The cemetery's large public vault, never adequately sealed, reeked of decay.

A fire at the Balch's home destroyed many of cemetery's burial records in 1831.

Another blow to the Presbyterian Burying Ground occurred in 1848, when 12.5 acres (51,000 m^{2}) Oak Hill Cemetery opened just five blocks to the northwest. This garden cemetery with beautiful landscaping, terraces, spacious grounds, and magnificent chapel—created and financed by the city's richest businessman, William Wilson Corcoran—deeply appealed to the residents of Georgetown and Washington. Over the next several years, Oak Hill became not only the cemetery of choice for new burials, but many families disinterred their loved ones at the Presbyterian Burying Ground and reburied them at Oak Hill. Oak Hill quickly expanded, and by 1867 had more than 25 acres (100,000 m^{2}) of space for burials. Bounded by city streets and existing homes, Presbyterian Burying Ground was limited in size. A large increase in burials at Presbyterian Burying Ground occurred during a cholera epidemic of 1834. Georgetown resident Charles H. Trunnel, who lived during the period, said that the dead were brought to the cemetery in cartloads. The dead arrived in such numbers so quickly that cemetery officials did not keep accurate records as to where corpses were buried. Many bodies were buried in the middle of the streets surrounding the cemetery, because church officials worried about filling the cemetery with cholera victims. Another upsurge in burials occurred during the American Civil War, as they did at all regional cemeteries, but otherwise the number of burials at the cemetery remained fairly constant and low.

The cemetery was only gradually enclosed after 1811. Although the fence was repaired in 1840, by 1849 the fence had almost completely collapsed and the cemetery was in a significant state of disrepair.

A fire at the sexton's home destroyed the cemetery's burial records in 1860.

The cemetery remained in general disrepair during the 1850s. But in 1860, a letter appeared in a local Georgetown newspaper which attacked the state of the graveyard. Fences were down, the gates open, cattle grazed on the property, and many of the funerary monuments and headstones vandalized. Women at Georgetown Presbyterian Church were scandalized. They formed a committee, led by Miss Mary Thomas, and asked that the cemetery be given into their care. The church leaders agreed, and the Thomas committee quickly made major repairs to the fences and walkways. The grounds were cleared of weeds and sod planted where the earth was bare. Until Thomas' death in 1890, the cemetery remained in good repair. The neighborhood surrounding Presbyterian Burying Ground, however, deteriorated after the American Civil War. Once home to upper-middle-class families, by 1891 it was surrounded mostly by homes leased by poor African Americans, and crime, vandalism, public drunkenness, and violence were common in the area.

== Closure and 1891 demolition attempt ==
Sextons' records showed that between 1860 and 1887, more than 1,200 burial plots were sold at Presbyterian Burying Ground. Each plot could hold as many as three people.

The cemetery, however, was in deteriorating condition. A number of bodies were buried in the public burial vault, described as on Market Street adjoining the chapel. But the odor of these decomposing bodies was so strong that the D.C. Board of Public Health declared the vault a nuisance and ordered it closed on April 10, 1874. On January 27, 1876, workmen digging the foundation of a house near the corner of 5th and Market (the northwest corner of the cemetery) discovered between eight and 10 skeletons. These were bodies buried during the 1834 cholera epidemic, and they were reburied further back on the lot.

It is not clear when the last interment was made at Presbyterian Burying Ground. The Washington Post reported it was a six-year-old child, buried in 1886, but D.C. public health records show it may have been a one-year-old child named Charles Frederick Watkins, buried on July 11, 1887. Presbyterian Burying Ground closed to new burials in 1887, at which time it contained an estimated 2,700 bodies. The closure significantly impacted the cemetery's finances. For thirty years, the cemetery had used the income generated by the sale of lots to keep the graveyard in good repair. Excess income, however, was not placed in a trust but rather used for other charitable purposes. The cemetery's sexton died about 1887 as well, and the church—with little incentive to appoint a new one—allowed the ground to once more fall into disrepair.

On August 1, 1891, trustees of the cemetery agreed to close it. The president of the board of trustees, S. Thomas Brown, said that Georgetown Presbyterian Church had no funds for the upkeep of the cemetery. The board agreed to revoke the burial permits of all those who had been buried in the cemetery. The buyers of burials plots thought they held fee simple title to their plots. But the trustees discovered that the cemetery had actually issued revocable permits. To revoke the permits, the trustees needed to publicize the cemetery's closure, and then ensure that unclaimed bodies were "decently interred". The trustees said it would advertise in regional newspapers to ask families to remove their loved ones' remains from the Presbyterian Burying Ground. The deadline for removal of bodies was November 1891, after which all remaining bodies would be disinterred and buried in a mass grave elsewhere.

The District of Columbia's public health officer, Dr. O.M. Hammett, quickly issued authorizations to families to permit disinterments—with most of the reburials, he said, happening at Oak Hill Cemetery. A few other reburials occurred at The Methodist Cemetery in the Tenleytown neighborhood or at Congressional Cemetery. One hundred and fifty permits were issued by October 30, and another 50 by November 7. A local undertaker offered to disinter and rebury any unclaimed body found in the cemetery, if someone purchased a burial plot for the body some place else in the city. The first disinterment was the six-year-old child buried in 1886. J.E. Libbey applied to remove about a dozen bodies from his family's crypt, and Mrs. Jean Gibson asked to remove 10 of her relatives. There was concern, however, because of the cemetery's age. The trustees believed that the majority of those interred at Presbyterian Burying Ground had no living relatives.

Some graves were rediscovered during the disinterments. On October 21, 1891, workers found the grave of Mary Stevens Livingston, wife of Robert R. Livingston (Founding Father, the former U.S. Minister to France, and the former Chancellor of New York [the highest judicial officer in that state]). Other discoveries were about who was not buried at the cemetery. Originally, it was believed that eight to 10 soldiers of the Union Army had been buried at the graveyard during the American Civil War. An anonymous donor pledged to pay for their disinterment, and offered 16 burial plots at Graceland Cemetery. But officials with the Grand Army of the Republic, a Union Army veterans organization, said they examined war-time records and found no evidence that any Union soldiers had been buried there. (The Washington Post claimed in 1896 that the organization exhumed the bodies of all Civil War soldiers buried there.)

Winter weather delayed most of the disinterments, and by spring 1892 at least 200 graves remained to be opened, with about 660 bodies to be removed. In May, undertaker Joseph F. Birch removed 34 pre-Civil War soldiers from the cemetery. Approximately another 120 disinterments occurred by the end of June, and cemetery officials that all removals would be completed in time to meet the fall deadline. A few disinterments occurred in September. By October, however, these had almost all stopped. By the end of the year, no more disinterment orders from living relatives remained to be fulfilled.

The abandoned Presbyterian Burying Ground became something of a tourist destination, with curiosity-seekers coming by every day to see the open graves and scattered tombstones. A portion of the cemetery remained in use, however. The chapel continued to be used by Georgetown Presbyterian Church as a classroom and choir facility for African American children attending the church's segregated "Mission Church". (Note: Georgetown Presbyterian Church erected a new church building in 1821 at Washington Street (now 30th Street NW) and Bridge Street (now M Street NW). The church built a larger structure on West Street (now P Street NW) in 1873, but continued to use the Bridge Street building as a "mission church" for African American worshippers.)

== Post-1891 deterioration ==
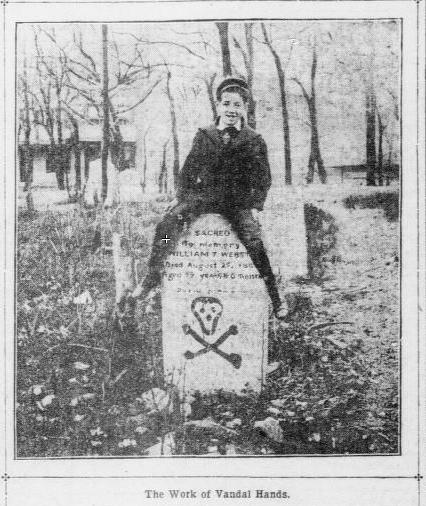
A child plays on a tombstone in the Presbyterian Burying Ground in 1903

Presbyterian Burying Ground deteriorated significantly after the 1891 disinterments. By mid-1893, it had become densely overgrown with grass, weeds, bushes, and sapling trees. Sporadic disinterments continued, but nearly all the former graves were left open rather than filled in, leaving sunken pits all over the area. Some graves had been opened by mistaken and not recovered, while other human remains were scattered over the ground. The entire place reeked of decomposition. On July 8, 1893, the District of Columbia Health Department ordered that no more removals occur for at least three months. It demanded that the cemetery's trustees remove all bodies from open graves and have them interred elsewhere, and that the entire cemetery grounds be disinfected. Twelve months later, the cemetery's wooden outer fence had almost completely fallen to the ground, the weeds and brush were so thick the grounds could not be traversed, and the grounds still reeked of decomposition. Local citizens attempted to contact the trustees to demand that they do something, but they could not be reached.

When the cemetery reopened, disinterments continued to occur sporadically. The Campbells and Morfeats were removed from their respective family vaults in May 1894. Yet, the Washington Evening Star reported that only 200 bodies had been removed from the site, and nearly 2,000 corpses still remained. Three bodies belonging to the Tenney family (a famous Georgetown banking and construction supply family) were removed in January 1895. The tomb of Benjamin Homans was dismantled in August 1895, and his body reinterred elsewhere.

Georgetown Presbyterian Church abandoned upkeep of the cemetery in 1895. The lack of a fence and the despoiled look of the cemetery led to widespread desecrations of the remaining tombs and graves. Poverty-stricken local citizens ripped down mausoleums for their bricks. On November 2, 1895, the large Kincaid family vault was torn apart in the space of just a few hours. Only three smaller mausoleums remained.

In August 1895, human remains were found at the site. Workmen were digging a trench to lay water pipes, and uncovered bones belonging to a large number of human bodies. The remains were reburied deep below the ground in the middle of an adjacent street. The incident angered local residents, who demanded that Congress appropriate funds to buy the cemetery and clear the land. But the heirs of Dr. Charles Beatty (the donor of the cemetery land) claimed that the land much revert to them if not actively used as a church or cemetery. They threatened to sue if the cemetery were sold. In February 1896, Georgetown Presbyterian Church established a "committee on church property" to dispose of the cemetery. The church agreed to advertise Presbyterian Burying Ground's closure once more, and to demand that all remains be claimed by September 1, 1896. The church agreed that all bodies which went unclaimed would be reinterred at another cemetery at church expense. The church said the property would be subdivided into housing lots and sold.

The deterioration of Presbyterian Burying Ground continued into 1896. Local people began using the cemetery as a garbage dump, throwing old wire, pieces of metal, tin cans, carcasses, and household ashes onto the grounds. There were open graves everywhere, and in some cases coffins protruded from the ground. In May 1896, a strong storm blew the roof off the cemetery chapel. Georgetown Presbyterian Church had appointed Andrew Goldsmith sexton of the cemetery, but he was unable to deal with the cemetery's many problems.

On September 5, 1896, the Presbyterian Burying Ground trustees announced that, the removal deadline having passed, all remaining bodies at the cemetery would be disinterred and moved to Beechment Cemetery in Montgomery County, Maryland. But no disinterments occurred. (Note: Beechment Cemetery, or Beechmont Cemetery (spellings vary), was announced on July 6, 1895. Although the cemetery corporation existed until 1899, the cemetery appears never to have been built. This may be one reason why disinterments did not occur at Presbyterian Burying Ground.)

The cemetery further deteriorated in 1897. By April, the high wooden fence on R Street had been torn down by residents of the area, while the fence on 34th Street had fallen in places. In the past year, looters had town down the brick walls surrounding all the vaults, and removed the brick courses supporting vault lids. (Bricks from cemetery mausoleums and vaults, The Washington Post reported, were used as building materials in nearly all the nearby homes.) Almost all the marble vault lids were shattered, and vandals had toppled or broken funerary monuments, tossed pieces into open graves, and thrown headstones around. Of the cemetery's large mausoleums, only the Eastburn structure remained standing. Since almost none of the graves opened for disinterments had been filled in, large holes existed all over the cemetery. Local residents filled them with trash, animal carcasses, and ashes. Children using the cemetery as a playground had trampled grave mounds so that it was no longer possible to distinguish graves from lawn.

By the fall of 1898, conditions at Presbyterian Burying Ground had no improved. Georgetown Presbyterian Church no longer had a sexton appointed to oversee the grounds, and a rank odor was coming out of many of the open graves. In September 1898, at the behest of Georgetown residents, the City Commissioners of the District of Columbia introduced legislation to make it a crime to allow property to become a public nuisance. Whether the legislation passed or not is unclear, but little was done to rectify the problems at the cemetery.

On December 9, 1898, a road crew working on a street adjacent to Presbyterian Burying Ground unearthed four skeletons. The Washington Post reported that these were likely victims of the 1834 cholera epidemic. Since the street had been regraded, many of these bodies were now very close to the surface.

== 1909 demolition ==
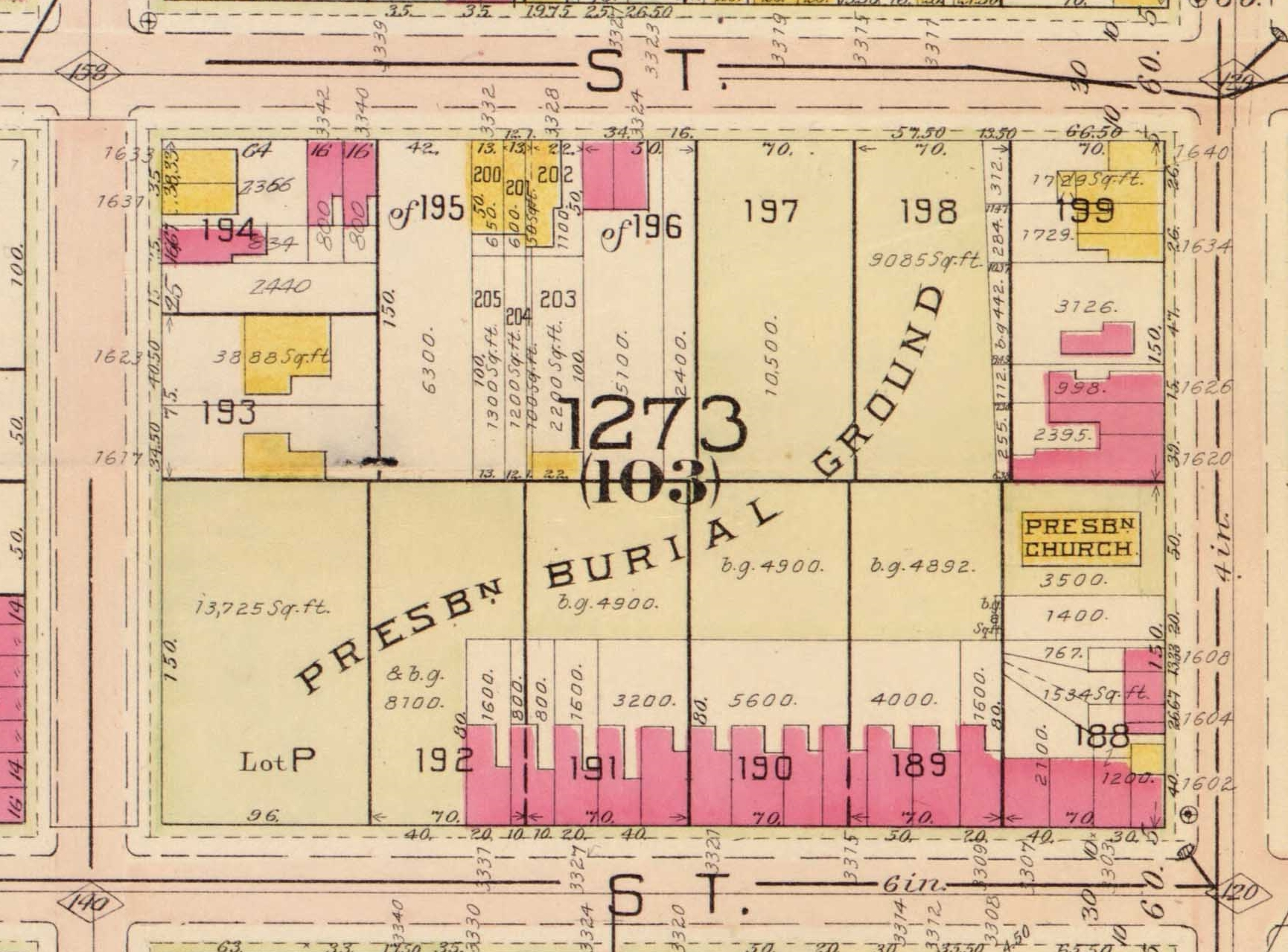
Map of the Presbyterian Burying Ground in 1903.

Beginning in 1899, a second attempt was made to demolish Presbyterian Burying Ground and turn the land into usable space. This process took a decade, but was eventually successful.

The second demolition effort began in March 1899, when parishioners at Georgetown Presbyterian Church indicated they would be willing to turn title to the land over to someone else provided the church received funds in return. By May, the Georgetown Citizens Association (GCA) was working on a plan to achieve the graveyard's closure. Members of the GCA attempted to meet with the cemetery trustees to work out a deal, but the negotiations were quickly terminated. The Washington Evening Star reported that church members were suddenly "sentimental" about the cemetery and did not wish to part with it, although later it was learned that a local realtor had attempted to purchase the land instead and that this sudden interest made parishioners reluctant to sell.

Unable to purchase the cemetery outright, the GCA began working on a plan to have Congress pass legislation condemning the land and turning it over to the District of Columbia for some public use. On May 7, 1899, a GCA subcommittee formed to handle cemetery issues issued a report requesting that Presbyterian Burying Ground be turned into a public playground, and that the City Commissioners be prevailed upon to push this legislation in Congress.

But despite the GCA's efforts, no action was taken on this legislative initiative. Georgetown Presybeterian Church sold the chapel to the West Washington Methodist Episcopal Church South (an all-black congregation) in 1901. (Note: The church changed its name to Calvary Methodist Episcopal Church, and then sold the chapel again to St. John's Episcopal Church in 1912. St. John's sold it to a private owner in 1925, and it was converted into a residence.) The cemetery's condition in 1901 was very poor. More than 100 vaults had been broken open, all the mausoleums had been looted of their brick and torn down, and headstones scattered widely. Only about 500 to 700 of the 2,700 people buried there had been removed, (Note: The Birch undertaking firm alone removed about 300 bodies.) and half of all burials could not be located because the markers were gone. Some relatives secured a disinterment permit, only to discover that the grave of their loved ones could not be identified. Those who remained belonged to both wealthy and poor families. A great number of remains had been unearthed, and bone fragments lay on the surface of the cemetery.

Although The Washington Post reported in May 1901 that a settlement with the Beatty heirs was expected soon, no settlement was forthcoming. In April 1903, the GCA formed a committee to again investigate the possibility of obtaining a condemnation law from Congress. These efforts were spearheaded by the Reverend Zed H. Copp, a nationally known Presbyterian author and evangelist. Copp determined that Georgetown Presbyterian Church members were willing to part with the cemetery provided that the bodies were reinterred elsewhere, and that church members preferred to have the land condemned rather than sold. To win the support of the City Commissioners for the legislative effort, the GCA submitted a 2,000-signature petition asking the city to condemn the land and have it turned into a public park. To bolster their case, several citizens of Georgetown formally complained to the Metropolitan Police Department, asserting that the cemetery was not only unsightly but that it had become a garbage dump and that the numerous bodies there were creating health problems. A city investigation concluded that unburied bodies were not problem, but agreed that local residents were using the cemetery for trash disposal. The investigation also noted that most of the vaults were in a state of collapse; numerous memorials and headstones had been broken, vandalized, or fallen over; and that the cemetery was heavily overgrown. The city commissioners agreed to contact Georgetown Presbyterian Church to urge them to maintain the property, but little else could be done. Although the City Commissioners gave the GCA a hearing in April, the following months the commissioners expressed concern that if the cemetery were removed, title to the land would revert to the Beatty heirs. The heirs, however, were demanding a large sum of money for the land, and the GCA urged the city to pursue condemnation.

Although negotiations continued between 1903 and 1907, the Beattys continued to object to any sale of the land. Three generations of Beattys were still buried at Presbyterian Burying Ground, and the family wanted the land back. In 1906, Congress appropriated $75,000 for playgrounds in the District of Columbia. After making the expenditures required by Congress, $30,000 remained which the City Commissioners agreed to spend in acquiring Presbyterian Burying Ground for a municipal playground. In May 1907, Allen W. Mallery, agent for the church, agreed to sell the cemetery to the city, but the Beatty family objected and the sale cancelled. For reasons which are not clear, the sale was consummated on June 20, 1907, for $27,969.25. The city, however, required the church to provide clear title and title insurance, and to clear the property of all bodies. The city was forced to spend $14,000 of the $30,000, however, leaving just $16,000 to pay the church. The 15 Beatty heirs continued to object to the sale, however, and the City Commissioners asked the city's legal counsel to investigate the Beattys' claim.

The city's legal counsel determined in October 1907 that the Beattys had a proper claim on the Presbyterian Burying Ground. So the city began condemnation proceedings, and that same month Georgetown Presbyterian Church began removing trees and tombstones from the property. (The underbrush by now was 4 to 5 feet (1.2 to 1.5 m) high.) The Beattys opposed the condemnation proceedings. Their attorney, William H. Monogue, claimed in November that the church had conducted no search for graves, had destroyed monuments and memorials, and had scattered human remains. He also claimed bones had been carted off-site to hide evidence of their desecration. Monogue further alleged that in grading the cemetery, the church had destroyed grave-mounds and obliterated any evidence of burials. The City Commissioners held a meeting to discuss Monogue's accusations, but determined that most of them were inaccurate. Undertaker Isaac Birch, however, estimated that at least undertaker Burch said at least 300 bodies still remained on the cemetery's northern half. Mallery denied that any remains had been scattered during grading, but did admit that some graves had been uncovered. One grave was found and opened, but no bones remained in the coffin. A vault was discovered, and when opened two skulls were found. The relatives were contacted, and a permit secured from the city to disinter the skulls and release them to the family. The vault of Valentine Reintzell, former Master Mason of Potomac Lodge No. 5 and head of Grand Lodge of District of Columbia, was rediscovered by workmen and his remains disinterred. The grave of Joseph Carleton, an officer in the American Revolutionary War, was also rediscovered and his remains removed.

Charles Beatty and 11 other Beatty family heirs sued Georgetown Presbyterian Church on November 24, 1907, to prevent the sale of the cemetery. The suit was heard by Ashley M. Gould, sitting as Associate Justice in Equity Court No. 2 of the Supreme Court of the District of Columba on January 20, 1908.

The outcome of Charles A. Beatty et al. vs. Trustees of the Presbyterian Congregation of Georgetown is not known. It is unclear whether the Beatty heirs won their suit, whether the city won its condemnation effort, or whether the heirs lost their suit and the church sold the property. (Note: Historians Paul Sluby, Sr. and Stanton L. Wormley do not mention the lawsuit. They claim that the city purchased the land from the church trustees, but provide no documentation of this claim.) However, on September 29, 1908, the City Commissioners recommended the purchase of the Presbyterian Burying Ground for $32,000. Some time in late June or early July 1909, the sale finally was consummated for $30,000. The city paid $20,000, while private donations came up with the remaining $10,000.

During preparation of the area for conversion to a playground, 30 more bodies were uncovered. These were sent to an undertaker for cremation and burial. But more than 2,000 corpses remained buried at the site. Noted D.C. historian John Proctor Clagett claimed in 1942 that most of the bodies near 34th Street NW had probably all been removed, but the central, southern, and southeastern portions remained untouched. The total cost of the Georgetown Municipal Playground (now named Volta Park) was $35,000, of which $30,000 was needed for the land and $5,000 for equipment. The new playground opened on October 30, 1909, and proved immediately popular.

== Post-conversion issues ==
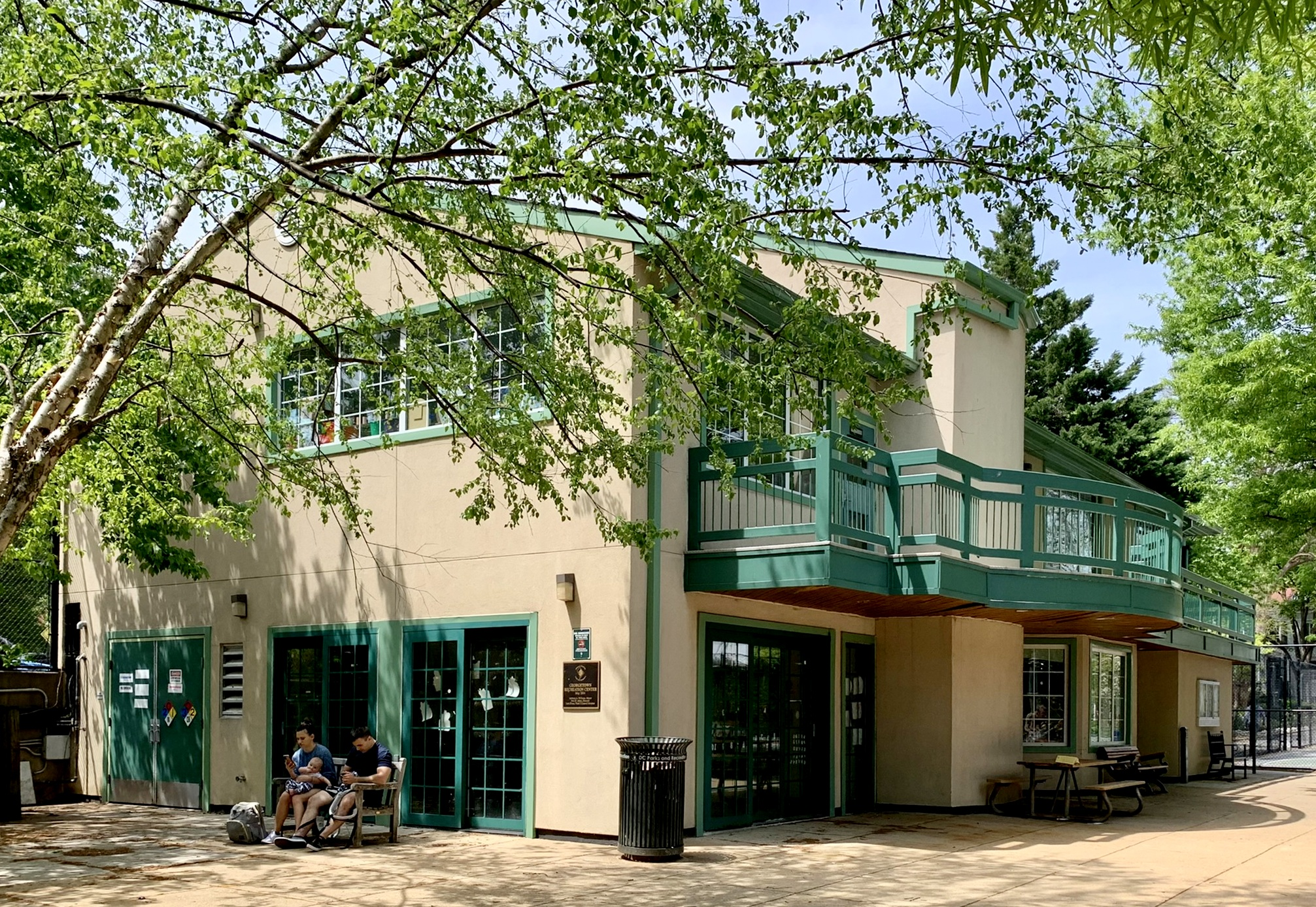
The Georgetown Recreation Center is located on the burial ground.

With so many bodies still lying in the earth at Volta Park, it is not uncommon for additional remains or for funerary monuments to be uncovered. About 1920, the Eden family living at 3311 Q Street NW uncovered nine bodies buried in the dirt floor of their basement. The family reburied them in the local street (at the time, a dirt road). Workmen digging a ditch for new fresh water lines uncovered human remains at the playground in September 1942. The bones were placed into boxes and interred at Blue Plains, a pauper's burial ground maintained by the city. About 1944, workmen digging a trench to lay sewer pipes across the southern part of the park exposed a brick burial vault. A large number of bones were removed from the vault, and taken away. Local residents often found tombstones or pieces of funerary monuments in the park. Carl Ernst, whose home was located at 1522 33rd Street NW, found numerous headstones in the 1930s and 1940s, some dating as far back as 1790. The Washington Post reported in 1949 that he embedded them in a cement wall on his property. In the early 1950s, workmen at the park unearthed the skeleton of a girl with long red hair and still wearing her funeral dress.

In 1957, diggers constructing a basement near the corner of 33rd and Q Streets NW unearthed six headstones. Not realizing their importance, they broke them up and disposed of them. Nonetheless, at the same time, some local boys found an intact small brown tombstone in the park close to where the men were digging. The tombstone, inscribed "E. S. 1825", was donated to the Historical Society of Washington, D.C.

In March 1958, the Daughters of the American Revolution (DAR) placed a commemorative marker in Volta Park to recognize those American Revolutionary War soldiers whose remains had never been disinterred from Presbyterian Burying Ground. While at least 13 Revolutionary War soldiers had been buried in the cemetery, historian Selden M. Ely said that six had never been disinterred. That same year, workers constructing an addition to 3317 Q Street NW found a skull while excavating the foundations. The family buried the remains in their back yard.

Remains continued to be found nearly a century after the cemetery was demolished. In 2005, workers rebuilding the foundation of a home at 3319 Q Street NW found a jawbone with most of the teeth intact, a few joints, and some ribs buried behind boards in the foundation wall. The remains turned over to city authorities. In September 2012, workers regrading a driveway between 3333 and 3329 Q Street NW uncovered a wooden coffin and intact skeleton. Forensic scientists from the Smithsonian Institution said the bones were likely those of a 35-year-old adult male. Archeologists from the D.C. Historic Preservation Office determined that the bones belonged to those of a 25-to-35-year-old African-American man. Additional archeological digging in the property's back yard uncovered several more "cemetery shafts". The archeologists discovered pine boxes containing the remains of four African-Americans.

== Notable interments ==
Many of Georgetown's most influential families had mausoleums at Presbyterian Burying Ground. These included the Beatty, Elliott, Hepburn, Holtzman, Mackey, Magruder, McPherson, Melvin, Murray, Peters, Reed, and Zevely families. Several ministers important in the founding and early settlement of Georgetown were also buried there, as was the man to kill the last Native American in the area. Of particular note, an unidentified Imperial Russian ambassador to the United States buried two of his infant children in the center of the cemetery beneath a marble pyramid. (There is no record of their having been disinterred prior to the cemetery's destruction.)

- John Adlum (1759-1836), father of American viticulture (disinterred c.1852 and reburied at Oak Hill Cemetery)
- Stephen Bloomer Balch (1747-1833), minister and founding preacher, Georgetown Presbyterian Church (originally interred at Georgetown Presbyterian Church at 30th and M Streets NW; disinterred and reburied at Presbyterian Burying Ground in spring 1873; disinterred and reburied on June 18, 1874, at Oak Hill Cemetery)
- John Barnes (1730-1826), founder of the Georgetown Industrial School (a poorhouse) and a major philanthropist (grave never identified, not disinterred)
- George Beall (1729-1807), colonel in the U.S. Army and prominent Georgetown landowner (no record of disinterment)
- Thomas Beall (1748-1819), prominent Georgetown landowner (no record of disinterment)
- Charles Beatty (1762-1838), physician and donor of the land for Presbyterian Burying Ground (no record of disinterment)
- Joseph Carleton (?-1812), U.S. Army paymaster in the American Revolutionary War and Georgetown merchant (disinterred November 1907 and reburied at Arlington National Cemetery)
- Thomas Corcoran (1754-1830), mayor of Georgetown in 1796, 1808–1810, and 1812 (likely buried at Presbyterian Burying Ground; disinterred circa 1850 and reburied at Oak Hill Cemetery)
- John Cox (1775-1849), mayor of Georgetown from 1823 to 1845 (no record of disinterment)
- Francis Dodge (1809-1881), first major importer in Georgetown and collector of tax duties at the Port of Georgetown for 20 years (no record of disinterment)
- Uriah Forrest (1746-1805), American Revolutionary War soldier; Member, U.S. House of Representatives; and mayor of Georgetown from 1792 to 1793 (date of disinterment not known, reburied at Oak Hill Cemetery)
- James Gillespie (1747-1805), American Revolutionary War soldier and Member, U.S. House of Representatives (disinterred April 1892 and reburied at Congressional Cemetery)
- John Haydock (1780-1807), chief stonecutter during the construction of the United States Capitol (headstone found, but no record of disinterment)
- Cecelia Ashton Stuart Hedgman (c.1812-1870), wife of noted Georgetown businessman John G. Hedgman (disinterred in May 1894, reburial location not known)
- David Hepburn (?-1805), prominent Georgetown landowner and noted early American horticulturalist (no record of disinterment)
- Benjamin Homans (1826-?), senior clerk in the United States Department of War and founder, Columbian Gazette (disinterred August 1895, reburial site not known)
- James House (?-1834), Brevet Brigadier General in the U.S. Army during the American Revolutionary War (disinterred 1902 and reburied at Arlington National Cemetery)
- J.P.C. de Krafft (1756-1804), German baron, American Revolutionary War soldier, and cartographer of the District of Columbia (disinterred with his wife in May 1892 and reburied at Congressional Cemetery)
- John Kurtz (1822-1877), Georgetown council member; president, Farmers' and Mechanics' National Bank and Potomac Insurance Company (disinterred August 1893, reburial site not known)
- Alexander Macomb (1782–1841), Commanding General of the U.S. Army from 1828 to 1841 (disinterred in 1850, and reburied at Congressional Cemetery)
- Thomas Mason (?-1813), brigadier general in the U.S. Army during the American Revolutionary War (disinterred 1902 and reburied at Arlington National Cemetery)
- James Mitchell (?-1862), captain of Potomac River boats Columbia and Osceola (disinterred along with his wife, daughter, son, and daughter-in-law in July 1892 and reburied in Oak Hill Cemetery)
- Robert Peter (1726-1806), first mayor of Georgetown from 1790 to 1791 (no record of disinterment)
- Daniel Reintzel (1755-1828), mayor of Georgetown from 1796 to 1797, from 1799 to 1804, and from 1806 to 1807 (disinterred in November 1907 and reburied November 1907 in the Masonic Circle at Glenwood Cemetery) (Note: The Evening Star newspaper claimed he was reburied at Prospect Hill Cemetery, but this is incorrect.)
- Valentine Reintzell (1761-1817), Master Mason present at the laying of the cornerstone of the United States Capitol (disinterred in November 1907 and reburied November 1907 at Glenwood Cemetery)
- Clotworthy Stephenson (?-1820), American Revolutionary War soldier and builder of several original houses on F Street NW
- Caleb Swan (?-1809), U.S. Army paymaster in the American Revolutionary War (disinterred 1902 and reburied at Arlington National Cemetery)
- John Threlkeld (1757-1830), mayor of Georgetown from 1793 to 1794 (no record of disinterment)
- William Theobald Wolfe Tone (1791-1828), soldier and son of Irish patriot Wolfe Tone (disinterred September 1891 and reburied first at Mount Olivet Cemetery and then Green-Wood Cemetery)
- William Waters (1766-1859), American Revolutionary War soldier and Georgetown magistrate (no record of disinterment)

== Bibliography ==
- Bailey, Chris H. (2000). The Stulls of "Millsborough": A Genealogical History of John Stull "The Miller", Pioneer of Western Maryland. New Hartford, Conn.: C.H. Bailey.
- Balch, Thomas Willing (1899). The Brooke Family of Whitchurch, Hampshire, England; Together With an Account of Acting-Governor Robert Brooke of Maryland and Colonel Ninian Beall of Maryland and Some of Their Descendants. Philadelphia: Press of Allen, Lane & Scott. p. 57. "Thomas Beall Georgetown died."
- Bryan, Wilhelmus Bogart (1914). A History of the National Capital: From Its Foundation Through the Period of the Adoption of the Organic Act. New York: Macmillan.
- Callis, Maud Proctor (March 1959). "Sixteen Revolutionary War Heroes and Patriots Honored by District Daughters". D.A.R. Magazine: 231–232, 346.
- Clark, Allen C. (1912). "Rev. Stephen Bloomer Balch, a Pioneer Preacher of Georgetown". Records of the Columbia Historical Society, Washington, D.C.: 73–95.
- Decker, Karl; McSween, Angus (1892). Historic Arlington: A History of the National Cemetery From Its establishment to the Present Time. Washington, D.C.: Decker and McSween Pub. Co. p. 94. "General James House Arlington."
- District of Columbia (1941). District of Columbia Code Annotated: 1940 Edition. Washington, D.C.: U.S. Government Printing Office.
- Ely, Selden M. (1918). "The District of Columbia in the American Revolution and Patriots of the Revolutionary Period Who Are Interred in the District or in Arlington". Records of the Columbia Historical Society, Washington, D.C.: 129–154.
- "Founders From the Western Shore of Maryland". Maryland Medical Journal: 93–96. July 1, 1899.
- Gahn, Bessie Wilmarth (1938). "Major John Adlum of Rock Creek". Records of the Columbia Historical Society, Washington, D.C.: 127–139.
- Herringshaw, Thomas William (1914). Herringshaw's National Library of American Biography. Vol. 3. Chicago: American Publishers' Association.
- Hurley, William Neal (1997). The Fulks Families. Bowie, Md.: Heritage Books. ISBN 078840699X.
- Jackson, Richard P. (1878). The Chronicles of Georgetown, D.C., From 1751-1878. Washington, D.C.: R.O. Polkinhorn. p. 269. "Corcoran 1847 Georgetown."
- Lesko, Kathleen M.; Babb, Valerie Melissa; Gibbs, Carroll R. (1991). Black Georgetown Remembered: A History of Its Black Community From the Founding of "The Town of George" in 1751 to the Present Day. Washington, D.C.: Georgetown University Press. ISBN 0878405267.
- Maryland Bureau of Industrial Statistics (1899). Annual Report of the Bureau of Industrial Statistics of Maryland. Baltimore, Md.: Bureau of Industrial Statistics.
- Mitchell, Mary (1986). Chronicles of Georgetown life, 1865-1900. Cabin John, Md.: Seven Locks Press. ISBN 0932020402.
- Nevin, Alfred (1884). Encyclopaedia of the Presbyterian Church in the United States of America: Including the Northern and Southern Assemblies. Philadelphia: Presbyterian Encyclopaedia Pub. Co. p. 251. "Georgetown Presbyterian Church 1782."
- Pippenger, Wesley E. (2004). Dead People On the Move!. Westminster, Md.: Willow Bend Books. ISBN 0788431943.
- Proctor, John Clagett; Black, Frank P.; Williams, E. Melvin (1930). Washington, Past and Present: A History. New York: Lewis Historical Pub. Co.
- Sluby, Paul E. Sr.; Wormley, Stanton L. (1990). Presbyterian Cemetery Records (Georgetown), Washington, D.C., 1805-1897. Washington, D.C.: Columbian Harmony Society.
