= Thomas Bloomer Balch =

American politician

Thomas Bloomer Balch was a Presbyterian pastor during the American Civil War. Thomas was born to Stephen Bloomer Balch and Elizabeth (Beall) Balch on February 28, 1793, at Georgetown, District of Columbia. Thomas Balch was a graduate of the College of New Jersey in 1813 and Princeton Theological Seminary in 1817, where he was a member of the American Whig Society. Hampden-Sydney College conferred an honorary DD on him in 1860. Baltimore Presbytery ordained Thomas on October 31, 1816. For several years he assisted his father in the church at Georgetown. He accepted a call to Snow Hill, Rehoboth and Pitts Creek, Maryland, on July 19, 1820. Snow Hill is the oldest Presbyterian Church in America. While serving there, he married Susan Carter, daughter of Charles Carter of Shirley Plantation.

Balch was listed as a missionary in Fairfax County, Virginia, from 1829 to 1836. His brother-in-law, Septimus Tuston, had been a regular preacher at Greenwich, Virginia, between 1825 and 1842. This connection may have led to Thomas becoming the stated supply at Warrenton and Greenwich, Virginia 1836-38, and again 1874-78. He supplied in Prince William and Nokesville.

Just after he accepted the call to the churches in Maryland, Thomas Balch married Susan Carter of Fairfax, Virginia, the daughter of Charles Beal Carter, an uncle of General Robert E. Lee. When Thomas and Susan moved to Prince William and Fauquier Counties, they bought a place between Auburn and Greenwich. He called the property Ringwood. He along with Jane Alexander Milligan ran a boarding school for girls there. Part of the structure was later remodeled. Thomas and his wife were direct observers of the American Civil War and interacted with both Confederate and Federal troops. Thomas Balch wrote of their personal experiences in My Manse During the War. Balch frequently wrote for the Southern Literary Messenger, The Christian World, and published in Christianity and Literature.

== Death ==
Thomas Balch died on February 14, 1878, in Prince William County, Virginia, at his home, Ringwood. His wife, Susan, had died the year before, and they are buried in the Presbyterian Cemetery at Greenwich Church Their daughter, Ann Carter Ashton, died shortly after her father, on Feb. 27, 1878. William Wilson Corcoran, who had been a friend of Thomas since childhood, later provided a monument for the couple at their burial place.

== Writings ==
- My Manse During the War provided by the University of North Carolina, Chapel Hill (My Manse During the War)
- The Ringwood Discourses - Various Sermons via books.google.com
- Ringwood Manse (a collection of related poems by Balch, collected by a suitor to his daughter, Julia) via archive.org
