= Stephen Bloomer Balch =

American minister (1747–1833)

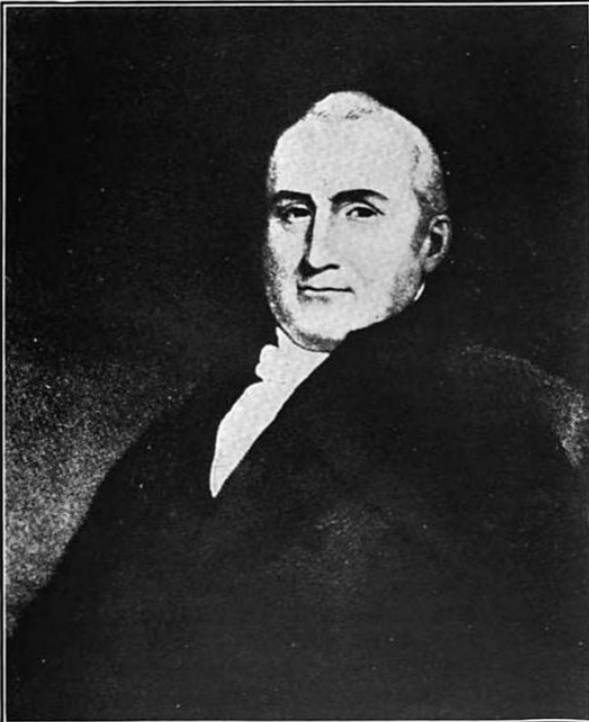
- Peale in an engraving by John Sartain
- Born: April 5, 1747; Province of Maryland, British America
- Died: September 7, 1833 (aged 86); Washington, D.C., U.S.
- Burial place: Oak Hill Cemetery; Washington, D.C., U.S.
- Education: College of New Jersey
- Spouses: Elizabeth Beall (m. 1781; died 1827) Elizabeth King (m. 1828; died 1828) Jane Parrott (m. 1830)
- Children: 11
- Religion: Presbyterian
- Ordained: 1779
- Offices held: Principal of Lower Marlborough Academy, Calvert County, MD; Headmaster of the Columbia Academy, Georgetown, D.C.

Stephen Bloomer Balch (April 5, 1747 – September 7, 1833) was a Presbyterian minister and educator in Georgetown, which is now part of Washington, D.C. In 1780, Balch established Georgetown Presbyterian Church, which was the second church in Georgetown. He also served as headmaster of the Columbian Academy in Georgetown.

== Early life and education ==
Balch was born on April 5, 1747, on his father James Balch's holding, "Bond's Hope", on the north side of Deer Creek in Baltimore County in present-day Harford County, Maryland. He attended the College of New Jersey, later renamed Princeton University, where his classmates included Aaron Burr and William Bradford. He earned a Bachelor of Arts degree in 1774.

== Career ==
After graduating from the College of New Jersey, Balch became principal of the Lower Marlborough Academy in Calvert County, Maryland. Balch also served in the American Revolutionary War.

In 1779, Balch was ordained as minister by the Presbyterian church. After that, he arrived in Georgetown, where he preached at Georgetown Lutheran Church. In 1780, he began preaching out of a small house used as a school during the week near Bridge Street, which is present-day M Street. Balch also became headmaster of the Columbian Academy in Georgetown, which is where George Washington sent his nephews.

A building was constructed for the church on Bridge Street at Washington Street, on present-day 30th Street, in 1782. The church expanded in 1793 and again in 1801, but the size was still insufficient. A new structure was built in 1821, and the church later relocated to P Street the 1870s. Many notable residents of Washington and Georgetown attended the church. Balch preached to a large crowd after the death of George Washington on December 12, 1799.

== Personal life ==
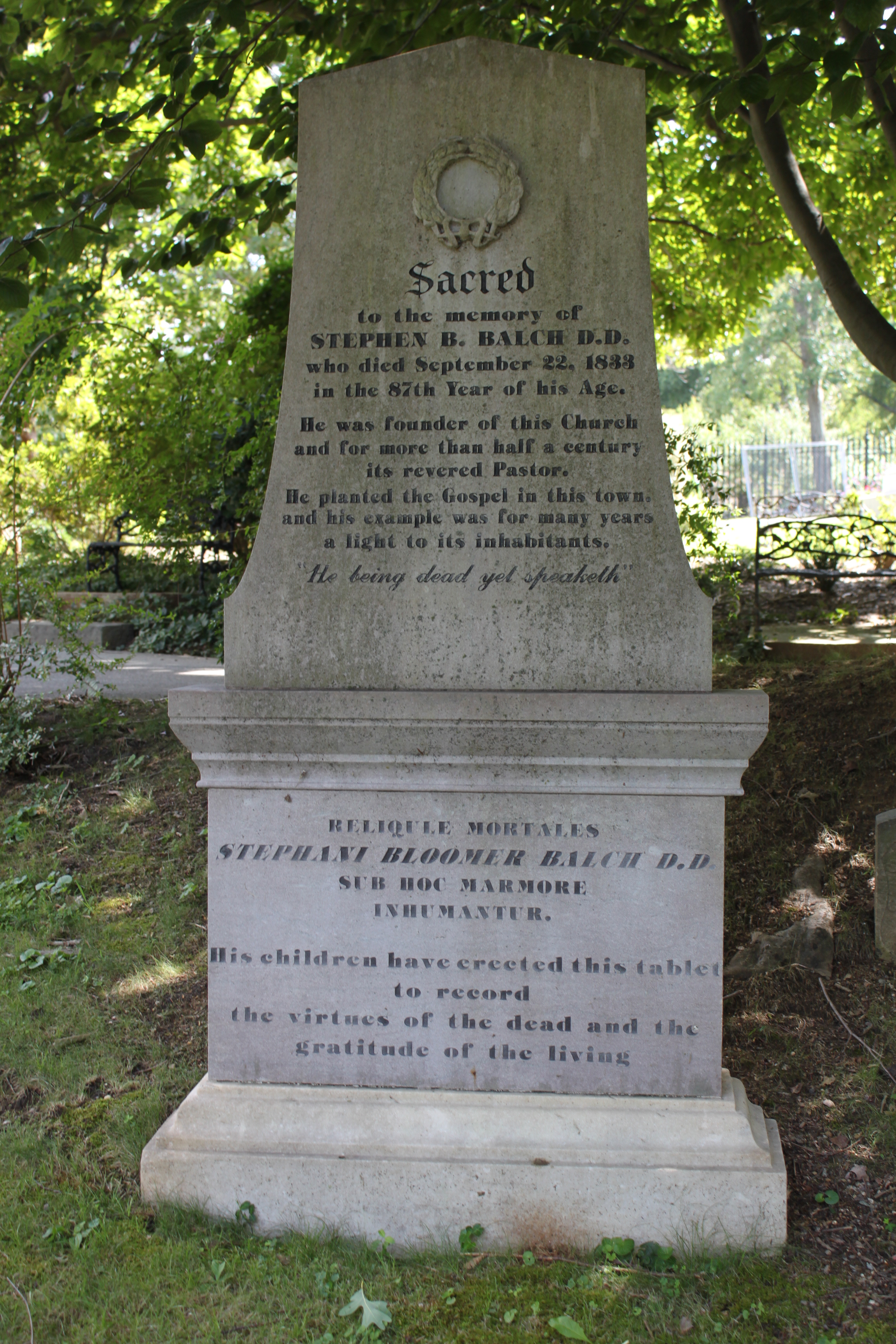
Balch's at Oak Hill Cemetery in Washington, D.C.

In 1781, Balch married Elizabeth Beall, who was the daughter of George Beall. Balch had a home built in 1783 on Duck Lane (now 33rd Street). Balch also owned an island in the Potomac River, as well as a 10-acre (40,000 m^{2}) farm outside of Washington. He spent the later years of his life living at 3302 N Street.

The Balches had eleven children including Harriet Balch (married 1st James Reid Wilson, and 2nd Gen. Alexander Macomb), Alfred Balch (Princeton, 1805), Lewis Penn Witherspoon Balch (Princeton, 1806), George Ninian Beall Balch, the Reverend Thomas Bloomer Balch (Princeton, 1813), Anne Eleanora Balch (married Capt. James Campbell Wilson), Elizabeth Maria Balch (married Rev. Septimus Tustin), Jane Whann Balch (married Rev. William Williamson) and Hezekiah James (died young) and Franklin (died young).

His wife died in 1827, and a year later at age 82 he married Elizabeth King, who survived the ceremony only 18 days. In 1830, he married a widow, Mrs. Jane Parrott. Balch remained the pastor of Georgetown Presbyterian Church until his death.

== Death ==
Balch died on September 7, 1833, in Washington, D.C. He was originally interred in the narthex of Georgetown Presbyterian Church at 30th and M Streets NW beneath a small pyramidal marble stone. In spring 1873, his remains were disinterred and reburied at Presbyterian Burying Ground, the church's cemetery. They were disinterred again and reburied at nearby Oak Hill Cemetery on June 18, 1874.
