= John Threlkeld =

Mayor of Georgetown, District of Columbia, United States

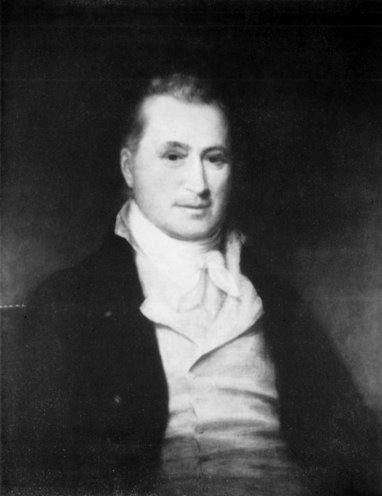
- Portrait of Threlkeld, ca. 1795

Mayor of Georgetown, Maryland
- In office January 7, 1793 – January 6, 1794
- Preceded by: Uriah Forrest
- Succeeded by: Pedro Casenave

Personal details
- Born: 1757 British America
- Died: 1830 (aged 73) Washington, D.C., U.S.
- Resting place: Presbyterian Burying Ground
- Spouse: Elizabeth Ridgely
- Children: 2

John Threlkeld (1757–1830) was an American politician, farmer, and landowner who served as an alderman and mayor of Georgetown, Maryland and a member of the Maryland House of Delegates.

== Early life and family ==
John Threlkeld was born in 1757, the son of Henry Threlkeld and Mary Brown Hopkins, and the grandson of Dr. Gustavus Brown, a lifelong friend of George Washington, physician, and founder of the hospital of the Continental Army. Threlkeld was the great-nephew of Thomas Stone, a signatory of the Declaration of Independence.

Threlkeld was raised in a household of "culture and refinement" and was described as a scholar of Latin, geography, and topography.

As a young adult, Threlkeld was one of the active members of a committee of correspondence during the American Revolutionary War. Threlkeld married Elizabeth Ridgely in 1787 and had two daughters, Mary and Jane.

== Career ==
=== Landowner and farmer ===
Threlkeld was a prominent landowner and farmer in Virginia and Maryland. He owned considerable land holdings and was an early adopter of the rental property business. By the mid-1780s, he owned land along the Potomac River and in much of the area of what is now known as Glover Park and Wesley Heights, which was used for pastures and orchards. Threlkeld and his father's consolidated land holdings in excess of 1,000 acres were referred to as "Alliance."

Threlkeld raised Merino sheep and English cattle on the land and grew apples, mulberry, and peach apricots. In 1797, George Washington purchased English cattle and a bull from Threlkeld. Threlkeld was associated with another U.S. president, Thomas Jefferson, and exchanged cuttings of fruit trees and other plant specimens with him during his presidency. Jefferson received mulberry and peach apricot cuttings from Threlkeld in 1809. Jefferson considered Threlkeld a close friend and they frequently corresponded for several years.

In 1809, Threlkeld was one of the founders of the Columbian Agricultural Society for the Promotion of Rural and Domestic Economy.

Threlkeld used slave labor and owned at least fifty enslaved persons during his adult life, the vast majority of whom had been inherited from his grandfather. Threlkeld is recorded as having freed a small amount of his enslaved workers through manumission.

=== Public service ===
Threlkeld was heavily involved in political affairs in Georgetown. When Georgetown was incorporated in 1789, he served as one of its first aldermen. In the same year, Threlkeld sold a portion of his land to Bishop John Carroll in 1789 which became Georgetown College.

He was elected Mayor of Georgetown in 1793, serving one term. During the same period, Threlkeld represented Montgomery County in the Maryland House of Delegates (1792 and 1793 sessions).

After serving as mayor, Threlkeld was a member of the Levy Court, which governed the areas of the District of Columbia outside of Georgetown and Washington proper, known at the time as Washington County, D.C. On March 2, 1801, two days before his last day in office, outgoing President John Adams nominated Threlkeld as a justice of the peace for Washington County, but the nomination sent to the United States Senate expired after Adams' presidency ended. In 1807, Threlkeld received a recess appointment from President Jefferson as a Justice of the Peace for Washington County. In the same year, Threlkeld wrote to President Jefferson promoting the appointment of his friend William D. Beall for an appointment to the Marshals Office for the District of Columbia.

=== Other activities ===
In 1802, the Washington Jockey Club sought a new site for the track that lay the rear of what is now the site of Decatur House at H Street and Jackson Place, crossing Seventeenth Street and Pennsylvania Avenue to Twentieth Street-today the Eisenhower Executive Office Building. Threlkeld, along with John Tayloe III, John Peter Van Ness, Charles Carnan Ridgely, Dr. William Thornton, G. W. P. Custis, and George Calvert of Riversdale, initiated moving the contests to Meridian Hill, south of Columbia Road between Fourteenth and Sixteenth Streets, and conducted the races at the Holmstead Farm's one-mile oval track.

For several years, Threlkeld was a director of the Bank of Columbia. The 1826 closure of the bank led to a "calamitous" period of severe financial and personal hardship for Threlkeld and his family. After the closure of the bank, Threlkeld was forced to auction hundreds of acres of property and land holdings to satisfy his debts. He also sold his remaining twenty-five enslaved workers during this period. During the same year, Threlkeld's wife and daughter both died. His daughter was only sixteen years of age.

== Death ==
Threlkeld died in 1830 at the age of 73 and is buried at Presbyterian Burying Ground.

== Legacy ==
Threlkeld's son-in-law John Cox served as mayor of Georgetown from 1823 to 1845. His grandson was Major Richard Smith Cox, a Confederate paymaster on the staff of General George Washington Custis Lee.

The property owned and developed by Threlkeld encompassed what now includes Georgetown University, Washington International School, Foxhall Village, and Burleith.

The "Threlkeld School" was a Georgetown-area public school constructed in 1868 that was named after Threlkeld.
