= George Gordon (merchant) =

Scottish merchant in America

George Gordon was a Scottish merchant and wealthy landowner who owned the 300-acre (1.2 km^{2}) Gordon's Rock Creek Plantation on land that eventually became part of Washington, D.C. In the 1740s, Gordon built an inspection house for tobacco on the plantation.

Knave's Disappointment, part of his landholdings, was surveyed in 1752 as a possible site for George Town (now Georgetown). Maryland offered Gordon two lots in the town, along with the "price of condemnation" (remuneration). Gordon accepted two lots (number 48 and 52). Maryland paid a total of 280 pounds to acquire the land from Gordon, along with land owned by George Beall.
