= Greenwich, Virginia =

Greenwich
- Unincorporated community
- Location within the state of Virginia Greenwich (Virginia) Greenwich (the United States)
- Coordinates: 38°44′57″N 77°38′53″W
- Country: United States
- State: Virginia
- County: Prince William
- Elevation: 360 ft (110 m)
- Time zone: UTC−5 (Eastern (EST))
  - Summer (DST): UTC−4 (EDT)
- ZIP codes: 20181

Greenwich is an hamlet in Prince William County, in the U.S. state of Virginia.

== American Revolution ==
In January 1779, captured British and Hessian troops were led through Greenwich on their way to prisoner of war camps located near Charlottesville. On June 5, 1781, General Anthony Wayne brought his brigade of the Pennsylvania Line over the same route on his way to support Lafayette in the final campaign of the Revolutionary War.

== Civil War ==
Although several engagements occurred nearby, Greenwich escaped unscathed, in part because of the creative actions of resident Charles Green, an Englishman. Green flew the British flag over his Carpenter's Gothic Home, The Lawn, built in 1855 (burned 1924). Three years later, he donated land for Greenwich Presbyterian Church. During the war, when Union troops threatened to appropriate it for a hospital, Green claimed it was neutral British property for use only as a church. The Federals relented and left it untouched.

Both Union and Confederate forces passed by here several times in 1862-63. On August 27, 1862, just before the Second Battle of Manassas, Federal divisions under Gens. Jesse Reno and Isaac Stevens, as well as Col. Orlando Poe's brigade, bivouacked here. They marched to Manassas Junction the next day in pursuit of Confederate Gen. Thomas J. Stonewall Jackson's force.

Federal cavalry chased Maj. John S. Mosby's rangers through Greenwich on May 30, 1863, after he raided Catlett Station. Mosby made a stand two miles west with a lightweight mountain howitzer but lost the cannon and several rangers including Bradford Smith Hoskins, a former British officer. Hoskins, carried to The Lawn, died of his wounds and was buried in the church cemetery.

Confederate Gens. A.P. Hill and Richard S. Ewell led their corps through Greenwich on October 14, 1863, pursuing the Union army as it withdrew toward the defenses of Washington. Because Hill occupied the direct road to Bristoe Station, Ewell diverted his column to a farm road he knew well, past his childhood home, Stony Lonesome. Hill's attack on the Union rear at the station resulted in a bloody Confederate defeat.

== Greenwich Church ==
The Greenwich Presbyterian Church and Cemetery was established around 1833 on land gifted from Charles Green, owner of an adjacent estate known as The Lawn. The adjacent cemetery has over 500 headstones and includes the graves of several American Civil War soldiers, including Captain Bradford Smith Hoskins, a colorful Englishman who rode with Colonel John S. Mosby.

== Greenwich in modern times ==
Greenwich is a residential community with only two public places. Mayhugh's Grocery is a general store offering a variety of food items plus CITGO gasoline pumps. The other public place is the Greenwich Presbyterian Church. Both are located at the intersection of Vint Hill Road (VA Route 215) and Greenwich Road (VA Route 603).
