= Greenwich Presbyterian Church and Cemetery =

Historic site in Virginia, US

- U.S. National Register of Historic Places
- Virginia Landmarks Register
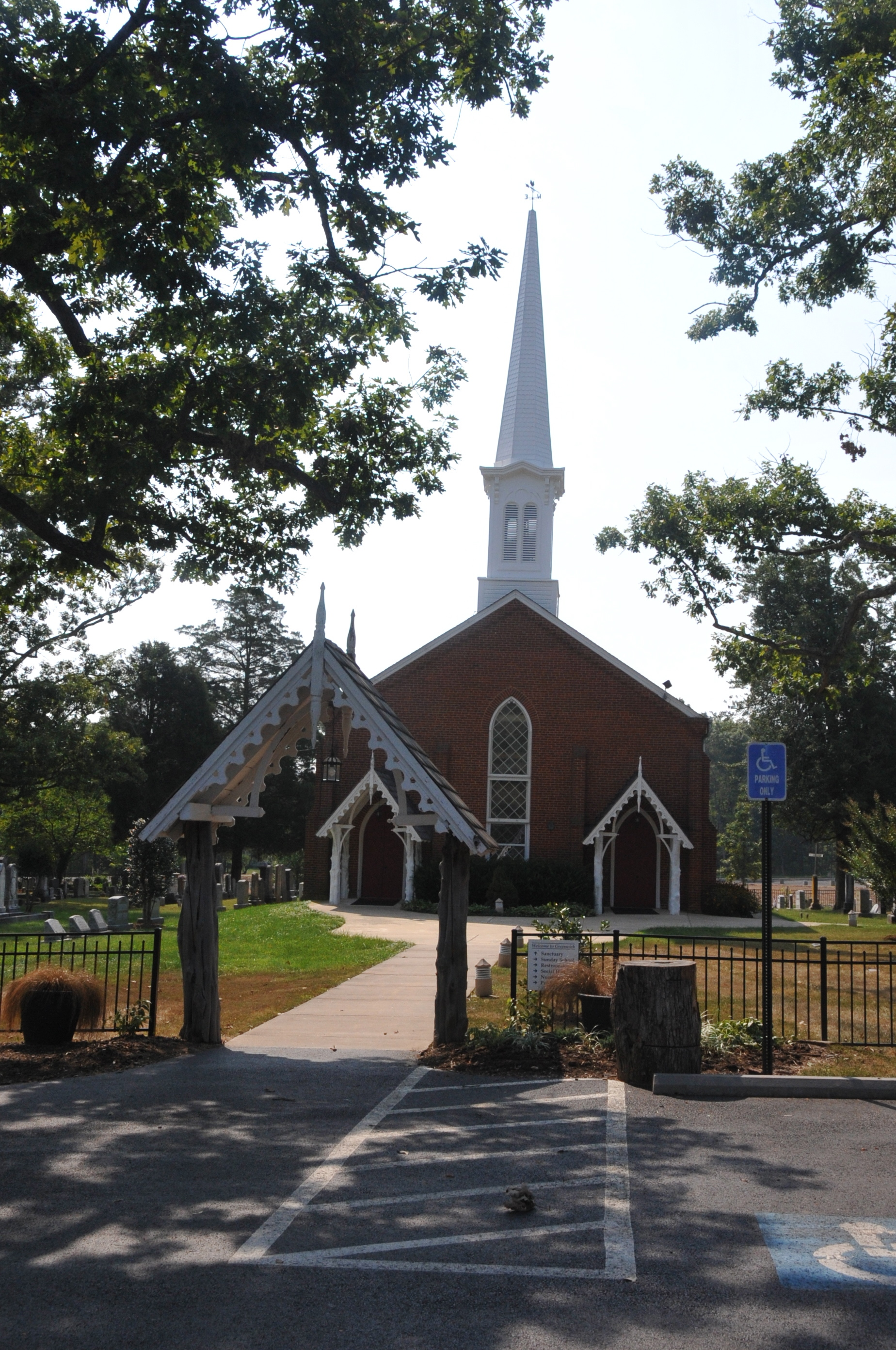

- Location within Northern Virginia Location within Virginia Location within the United States
- Location: 9510 Burwell Rd., Greenwich, Virginia
- Coordinates: 38°44′54″N 77°38′53″W
- Area: 7.6 acres (3.1 ha)
- Built: 1859
- Architectural style: Gothic Revival
- MPS: Civil War Properties in Prince William County MPS
- NRHP reference No.: 89001065
- VLR No.: 076-0175

Significant dates
- Added to NRHP: August 18, 1989
- Designated VLR: December 13, 1988

Greenwich Presbyterian Church and Cemetery is a historic Presbyterian church and cemetery located at 9510 Burwell Road in Greenwich, Prince William County, Virginia. It was started in 1859, and is a one-story, gable-roofed brick church building in the Gothic Revival style. It features two pointed-arched front doors, decorative buttresses on the side walls, and large, pointed, arched windows on the front and side walls. It has a wooden church tower with a louvred belfry and a shingle-covered spire topped by a weathervane. The adjacent cemetery has at least 100 headstones and includes the graves of several American Civil War soldiers, including Captain Bradford Smith Hoskins, a colorful Englishman who rode with Colonel John S. Mosby.

It was added to the National Register of Historic Places in 1989.
