= George Beall =

American businessman (1729–1807)

Coat of Arms of George Beall

George Beall, Jr. (February 26, 1729 – October 15, 1807) was a wealthy landowner in Maryland and Georgetown in what is now Washington, D.C. He was the son of George Beall, Sr. (1695-1780) and Elizabeth Brooke (1699-1748), daughter of Col. Thomas Brooke (c. 1659-1730/31). Beall was the grandson of Col. Ninian Beall (1625-1717) and Ruth Moore (1651-1712). George Beall married Elizabeth Magruder.

George's grandfather, Ninian Beall, among other political and military service, was a member of the Grand Committee of Twenty at the Protestant Associators' Convention of 1689-1692, the executive council of the colony during the absence of control by the Calvert Family.

Beall's Levels and Rock of Dumbarton, part of his landholdings, were surveyed in 1752 as a possible site for George Town (now Georgetown). Maryland offered Beall two lots in the town, along with the "price of condemnation" (remuneration). Beall protested the proceedings, though ended up accepting two lots. Maryland paid a total of 280 pounds to acquire the land from Beall, along with land owned by George Gordon.

Beall died on October 15, 1807, and was originally buried in a family plot alongside their home on N Street (at 31st Street). Around 1870, he was moved to the Presbyterian Burying Ground, (now Volta Park) in Georgetown. His remains were moved to Oak Hill Cemetery in July 1871 to an unmarked grave on Reno Hill, Lot 754.

== Bibliography ==
- Balch, Thomas Willing (1899). The Brooke Family of Whitchurch, Hampshire, England; Together With an Account of Acting-Governor Robert Brooke of Maryland and Colonel Ninian Beall of Maryland and Some of Their Descendants. Philadelphia: Press of Allen, Lane & Scott. p. 57. "Thomas Beall Georgetown died."
