= Immaculate Conception Cathedral, Managua =

Managua Cathedral
- The Metropolitan Cathedral of the Immaculate Conception of Mary; Catedral Metropolitana de la Inmaculada Concepción de María
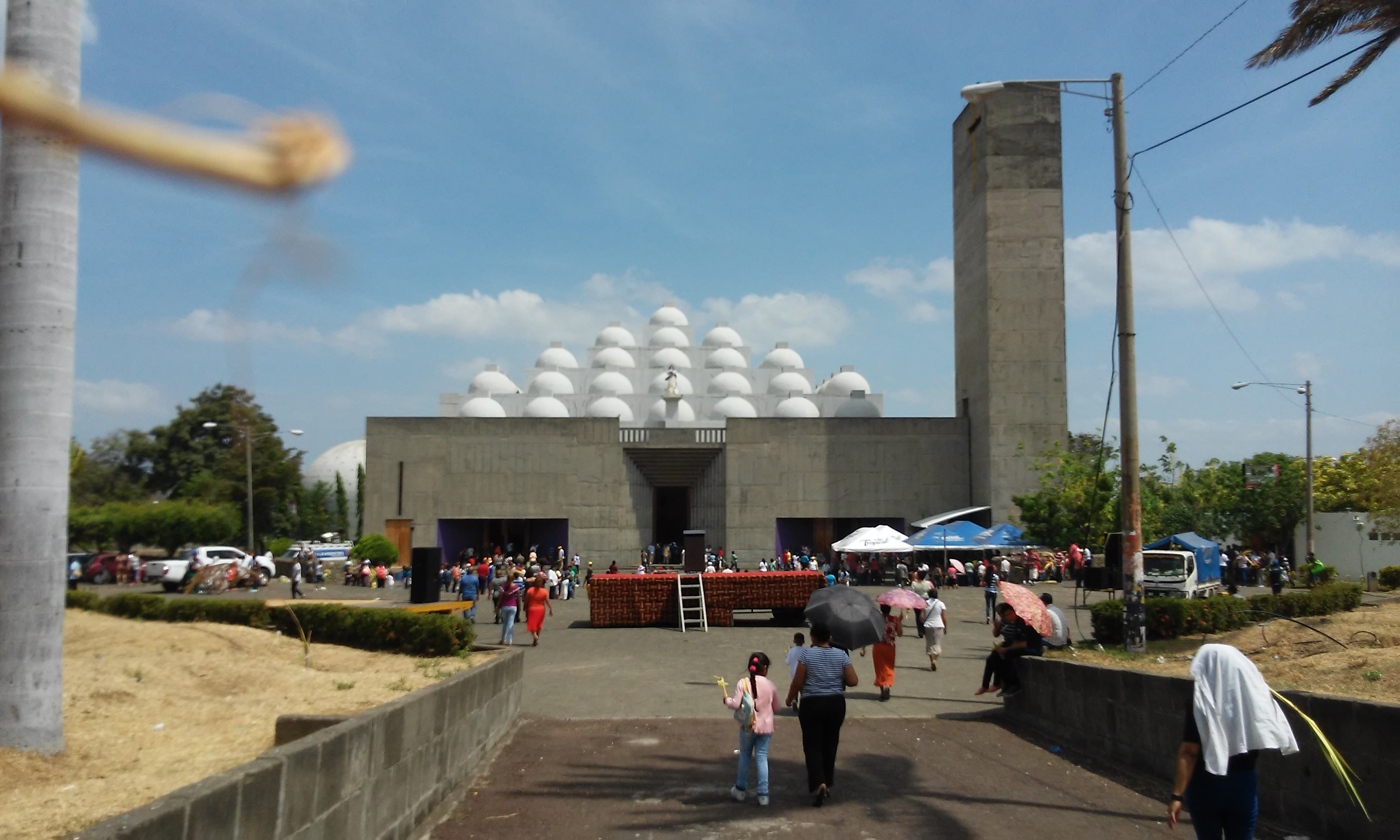
- The main façade of the cathedral on Palm Sunday in 2017.

- Location in Nicaragua
- 12.132687°N 86.265853°W
- Location: Managua
- Country: Nicaragua
- Denomination: Catholic Church
- Website: Managua Cathedral Website

History
- Status: Cathedral
- Founded: 1991
- Founder: Cardinal Miguel Obando y Bravo S.D.B.
- Dedication: Immaculate Conception of the Blessed Virgin Mary
- Consecrated: September 4, 1993

Architecture
- Functional status: Active
- Architect: Ricardo Legorreta
- Architectural type: Cathedral
- Style: Eclectic, Romanesque and Arabic
- Completed: August, 1993 (present Cathedral)
- Construction cost: USD 4.5 Million

Administration
- Province: Ecclesiastical Province of Nicaragua
- Archdiocese: Roman Catholic Archdiocese of Managua

Clergy
- Archbishop: Leopoldo José Cardinal Brenes
- Rector: Pbro. Luis Alberto Herrera
- Vicar: Pbro. Silvio Josué Romero Pbro. Mario Guevara Pbro. Rodolfo López

The Metropolitan Cathedral of the Immaculate Conception of Mary (Spanish: Catedral Metropolitana de la Inmaculada Concepción de María), referred to as the New Cathedral (La Nueva Catedral), is located in Managua, Nicaragua. It was dedicated to the Immaculate Conception of the Virgin Mary.

== History ==
The cathedral was built in 1991 to serve as a replacement for the Old Cathedral of Managua or St. James' Cathedral (Catedral de Santiago). The old cathedral was damaged and thought to be unrestoreable after a 1972 earthquake that destroyed 90% of the city.

The new cathedral was designed by the Mexican architect Ricardo Legorreta. Construction began around August 1991, and the cathedral was inaugurated on September 4, 1993. The cost of the newly built cathedral was estimated at $4.5 million. The new cathedral has generated much controversy, particularly about its architectural style and finance. The costs were covered partially thanks to the help of American Tom Monaghan, owner of Domino's Pizza. Locals refer to it as La Chichona on account of the plethora of cupolas adorning it which resemble many chichas (Nicaraguan spanish: slang for "breasts").

A fire started by a Molotov cocktail damaged an image of Sangre de Cristo y el Santísimo in the cathedral on July 31, 2020. Neither of the two people in the cathedral at the time were injured.

== See also ==
- Managua
- Religion in Nicaragua
