= Diocese of Juigalpa =

Roman Catholic diocese in Nicaragua

Coordinates: 12.1064°N 85.3645°W

Diocese of Juigalpa Dioecesis Iuigalpensis
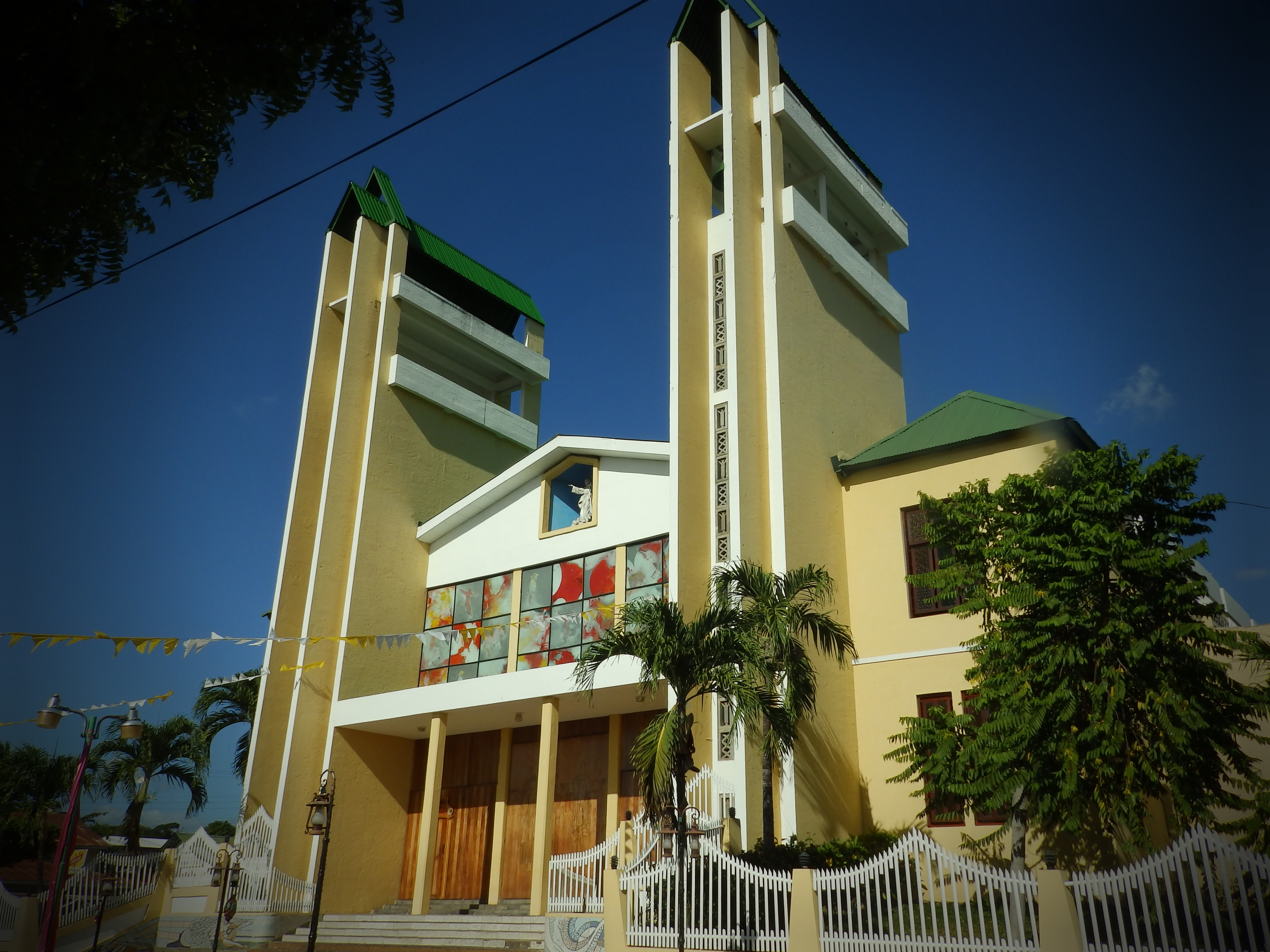
- Juigalpa Catedral in 2015

Location
- Country: Nicaragua
- Ecclesiastical province: Province of Managua
- Metropolitan: Leopoldo José Brenes Solórzano

Statistics
- Area: 14,022 km^{2} (5,414 sq mi)
- Population: Total; Catholics: (as of 2022); 386,000; 321,000 (83.2%)
- Parishes: 29

Information
- Denomination: Roman Catholic
- Rite: Roman Rite
- Established: 21 July 1962 (63 years ago)
- Cathedral: Cathedral of Our Lady of the Assumption

Current leadership
- Pope: Leo XIV
- Bishop: Marcial Humberto Guzmán Saballo

Map
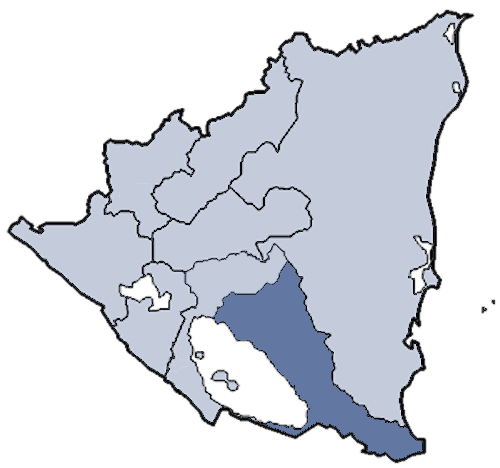

The Roman Catholic Diocese of Juigalpa (erected 21 July 1962, as the Territorial Prelature of Juigalpa) is a suffragan of the Archdiocese of Managua. It was elevated on 30 April 1991.

== Ordinaries ==
- Julián Luis Barni Spotti, O.F.M. (1962–1970), appointed Bishop of Matagalpa
- Pablo Antonio Vega Mantilla (1970–1993)
- Bernardo Hombach Lütkermeier (1995–2003), appointed Bishop of Granada
- Sócrates René Sándigo Jiron (2004–2019), appointed Bishop of León en Nicaragua
- Marcial Humberto Guzmán Saballo (2020–)

== See also ==
- Catholic Church in Nicaragua
