= Rubén López =

Rubén López may refer to:

- Rubén López Sabariego (1917–1961), Cuban bus driver who mysteriously disappeared and died
- Rubén López Ardón (born 1934), Nicaraguan Roman Catholic bishop
- Rubén López (footballer, born 1979), Spanish footballer
- Rubén López (gymnast) (born 1990), Spanish gymnast
- Rubén López (footballer, born 2004), Spanish footballer
