= Hombach =

Hombach may refer to:

- Bernhard Hombach (born 1933), German-born Nicaraguan Roman Catholic bishop
- Bodo Hombach (born 1952), German politician, member of the SPD
- Hombach (Ochtum), a river of Lower Saxony, Germany, tributary of the Ochtum
- Hombach (Westerbach), a river of Bavaria, Germany, tributary of the Westerbach
- Schmelzbach, other name Hombach, a river of North Rhine-Westphalia, Germany, tributary of the Sieg
