= Diocese of Jinotega =

Roman Catholic diocese in Nicaragua

Coordinates: 13.0919°N 86.0027°W

Diocese of Jinotega Dioecesis Xinotegana
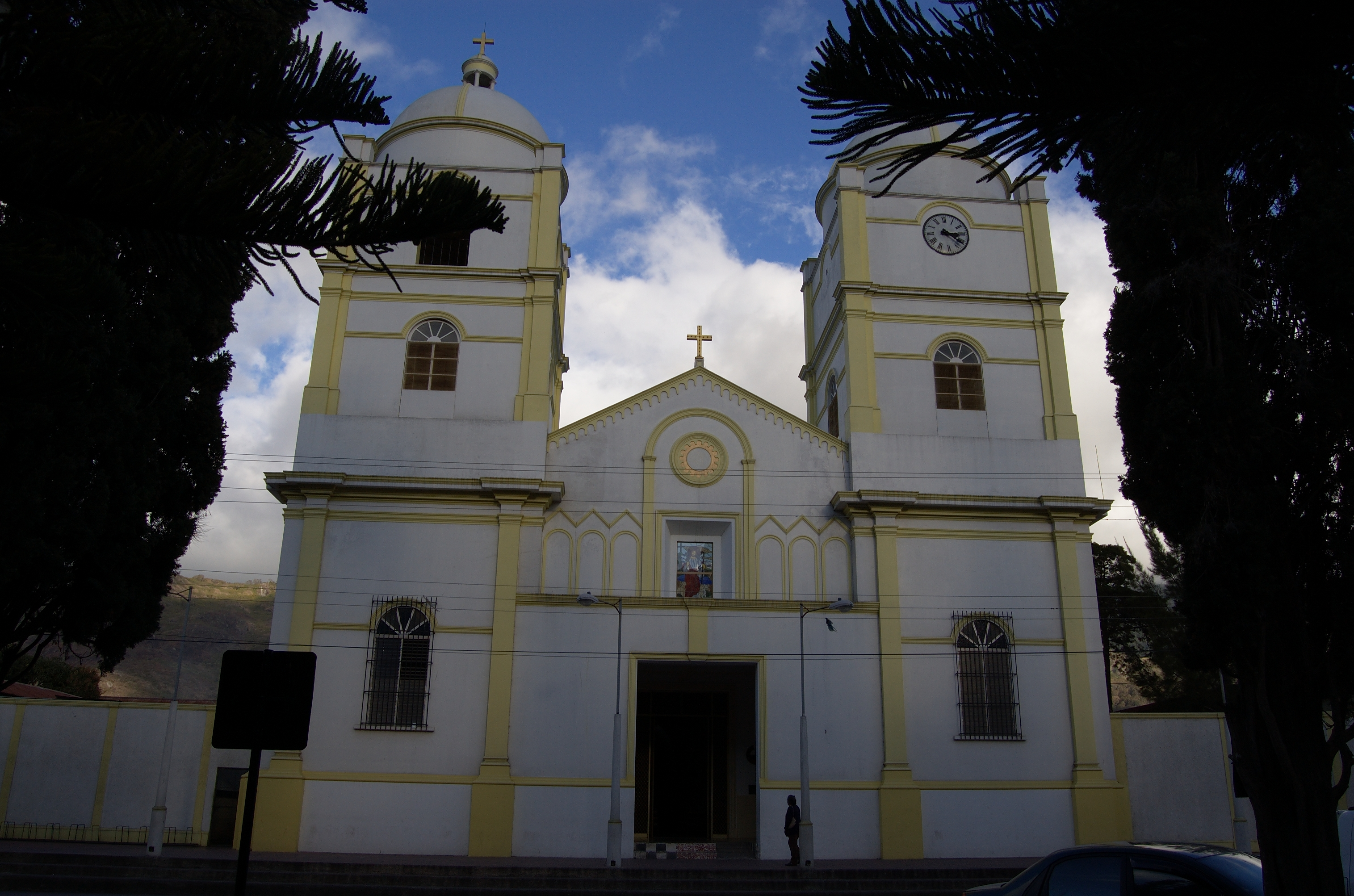
- The Cathedral of St. John Baptist

Location
- Country: Nicaragua
- Ecclesiastical province: Province of Managua
- Metropolitan: Leopoldo José Brenes Solórzano

Statistics
- Area: 9,755 km^{2} (3,766 sq mi)
- Population: Total; Catholics: (as of 2022); 482,000; 326,230 (67.7%)
- Parishes: 36

Information
- Denomination: Roman Catholic
- Rite: Roman Rite
- Established: 18 June 1982 (43 years ago)
- Cathedral: St. John Cathedral

Current leadership
- Pope: Leo XIV
- Bishop: Carlos Enrique Herrera Gutiérrez, O.F.M.

Map
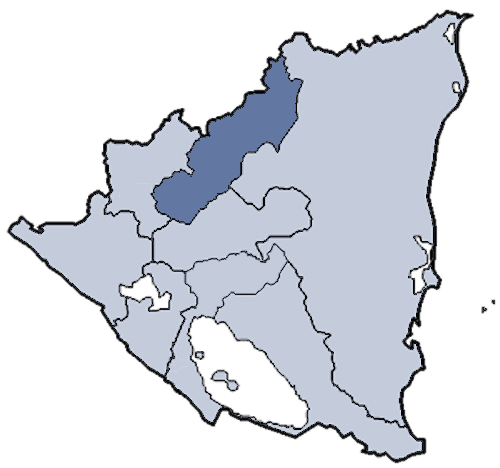

The Roman Catholic Diocese of Jinotega (erected 18 June 1982, as the Territorial Prelature of Jinotega) is a suffragan of the Archdiocese of Managua. It was elevated on 30 April 1991.

== Ordinaries ==
- Pedro Lisímaco de Jesús Vílchez Vílchez (1982–2005)
- Carlos Enrique Herrera Gutiérrez, O.F.M. (2005– )

== See also ==
- Catholic Church in Nicaragua
