= Episcopal Conference of Nicaragua =

Assembly of Catholic bishops

The Episcopal Conference of Nicaragua (Spanish: Conferencia Episcopal de Nicaragua, CEN) is the episcopate of Nicaragua. The CEN is a member of the Latin American Episcopal Conference and the Central Episcopal Secretariate of America (CESA).

In 2024, the Nicaraguan government exiled the current president of the Episcopal Conference.

== Bishops ==
List of presidents of the Bishops' Conference:

- 1963-1968: Vicente Alejandro González y Robleto, archbishop of Managua
- 1968-1969: Isidro Augusto Oviedo y Reyes, bishop of León en Nicaragua
- 1969-1971: Donaldo Núñez Chavez, auxiliary bishop of Managua
- 1971-1975: Miguel Obando y Bravo, archbishop of Managua
- 1975-1979: Manuel Salazar y Espinoza, Bishop of León en Nicaragua
- 1979-1983: Miguel Obando y Bravo, archbishop of Managua
- 1983-1985: Pablo Antonio Vega Mantilla, Bishop of Juigalpa
- 1985-1989: Miguel Obando y Bravo, archbishop of Managua
- 1989-1991: Albert Salvador Schlaefer Berg, Vicar Apostolic of Bluefields
- 1991-1993: César Bosco Vivas Robelo, bishop of León en Nicaragua
- 1993-1997: Miguel Obando y Bravo, archbishop of Managua
- 1997-1999: César Bosco Vivas Robelo, bishop of León en Nicaragua
- 1999-2005: Miguel Obando y Bravo, archbishop of Managua
- 2005: César Bosco Vivas Robelo, bishop of León en Nicaragua
- 2005-2011: Leopoldo José Brenes Solórzano, archbishop of Managua
- 2011 - ... Rene Sócrates Sándigo Jirón, bishop of Juigalpa

== See also ==
- Catholic Church in Nicaragua
