= Abelardo Mata =

Nicaraguan Roman Catholic bishop (born 1946)

His Excellency, The Most Reverend Juan Abelardo Mata Guevara S.D.B.
- Bishop Emeritus of Estelí
- Church: Roman Catholic Church
- Archdiocese: Managua
- Diocese: Estelí
- Appointed: 6 March 1990
- Term ended: 6 July 2021
- Predecessor: Rubén López Ardón
- Successor: Rolando José Álvarez Lagos
- Previous posts: Titular Bishop of Coeliana and Auxiliary Bishop of Managua (1988–1990)

Orders
- Ordination: 15 August 1976
- Consecration: 19 March 1988 by Miguel Obando Bravo

Personal details
- Born: 23 June 1946 (age 80) Managua, Nicaragua
- Education: Pontifical Biblical Institute
- Motto: Omnia omnibus factus
- Coat of arms

Juan Abelardo Mata Guevara, S.D.B. (born 23 June 1946) is a Nicaraguan Roman Catholic prelate who served as Bishop of Estelí from 1990 until his retirement in 2021. Previously, he was auxiliary bishop of the Archdiocese of Managua and titular bishop of Coeliana since 1988 until 1990.

== Early life ==
Mata Guevara was born in Managua and entered the Salesians of Don Bosco in 1965, making his religious profession the following year, on 8 December 1966. He studied theology in Guatemala and biblical studies in Rome, at the Pontifical Biblical Institute, before being ordained a priest on 15 August 1976. He later served in pastoral, educational and formation ministries within the Salesian congregation.

== Episcopal ministry ==
On 13 February 1988, Pope John Paul II appointed Mata Guevara auxiliary bishop of Managua and titular bishop of Coeliana. He received episcopal consecration on 19 March 1988 from Cardinal Miguel Obando Bravo. On 6 March 1990 he was appointed Bishop of Estelí.

During his episcopate he served in several offices of the Episcopal Conference of Nicaragua, including secretary general and vice president.

== Public activity ==
In 2013 Mata Guevara criticized Law 779 on violence against women, arguing that parts of the legislation undermined family unity, remarks that generated public controversy.

During the 2018 Nicaraguan protests he became one of the country's most outspoken Catholic bishops. On 15 July 2018, the vehicle in which he was travelling was attacked by armed Pro-Ortega paramilitaries, although he was unharmed.

Pope Francis accepted his resignation on 6 July 2021 after he reached the canonical retirement age.

In 2026, media outlets reported that Mata Guevara had been placed under house arrest amid the Nicaraguan government's continuing restrictions on members of the Catholic Church.
