= St. John Cathedral, Jinotega =

St. John Cathedral
- Catedral de San Juan
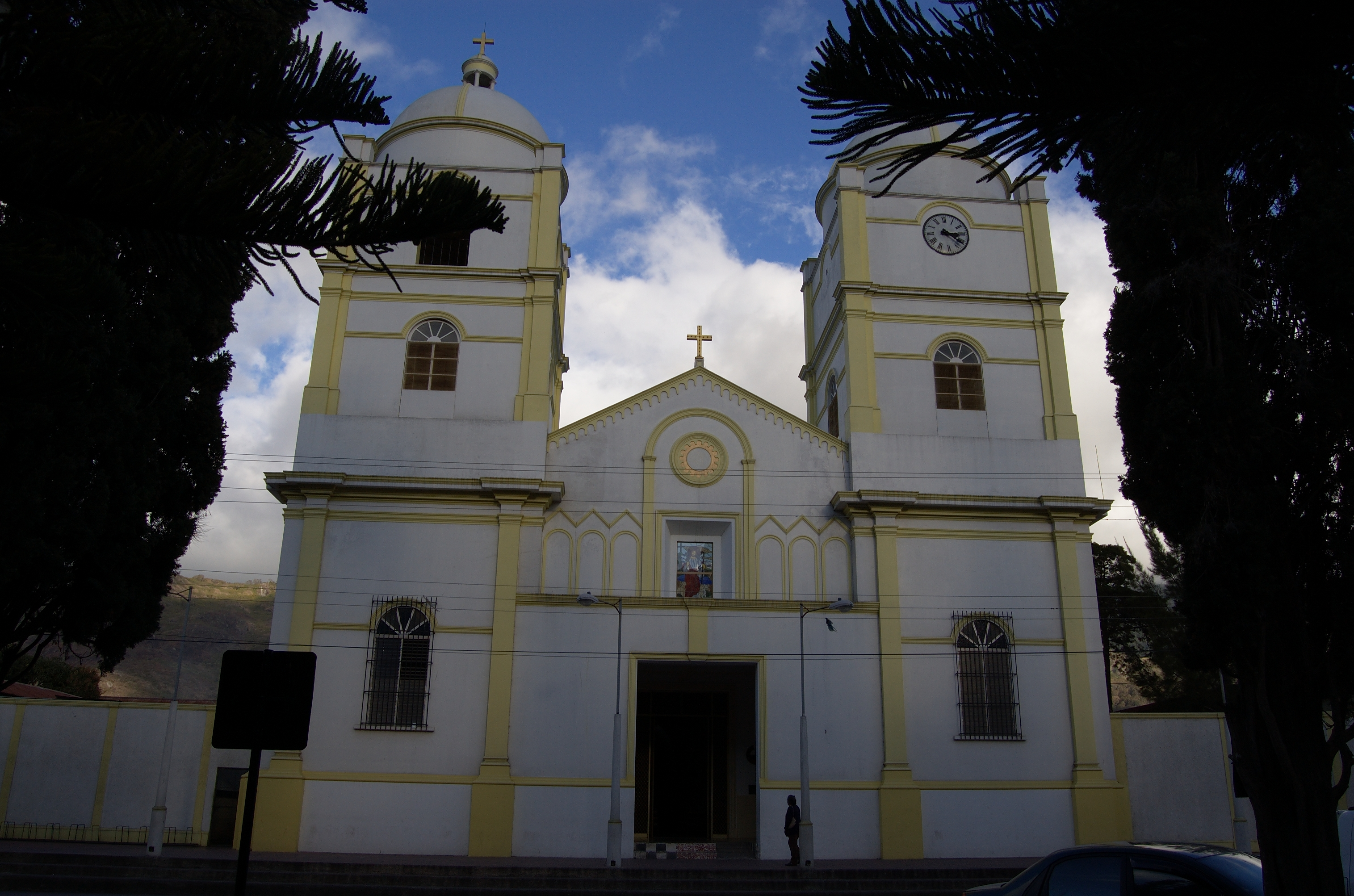
- St. John Cathedral
- 13.0919°N 86.0024°W
- Location: Jinotega
- Country: Nicaragua
- Denomination: Roman Catholic Church

Administration
- Diocese: Roman Catholic Diocese of Jinotega

The Cathedral of Saint John (Spanish: Catedral de San Juan) or simply Jinotega Cathedral, located in central Jinotega, Nicaragua, is the seat of the Roman Catholic Diocese of Jinotega.

A small straw structure was installed in 1752, and the first church was built in its original form in 1805. It was rebuilt in 1882 and again between 1952 and 1958. In 2008 it was reported that the church was in need of a renovation.

It was designated the cathedral with the erection of the Diocese of Jinotega (Dioecesis Xinoteganus) in 1991, through the bull "Quod Praelatura Xinotegana" of Pope John Paul II.

It is under the pastoral responsibility of Bishop Carlos Enrique Herrera Gutiérrez.

== See also ==
- Catholic Church in Nicaragua
