= Diocese of Ziqua =

Roman Catholic titular see

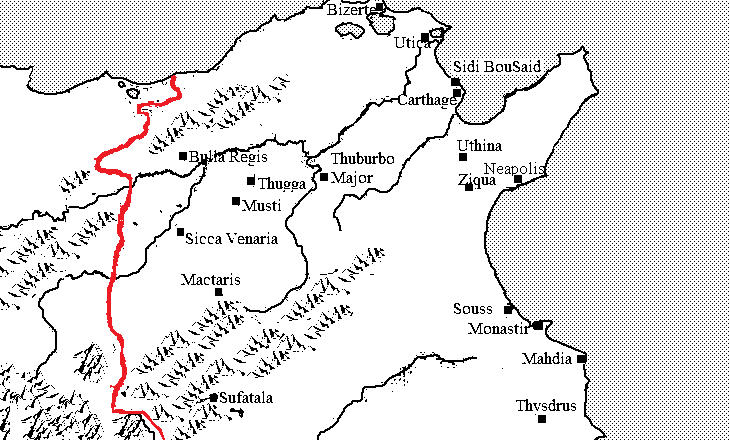
Map of Roman Africa Proconsularae.

Diocese of Ziqua is a titular see of the Roman Catholic Church in North Africa.

Ziqua was an ancient Roman town of classical antiquity, in Roman North Africa, during the Roman Empire.

It was on the road from the port at Neopolis to Thabbora in the hinterland, and is today identified with ruins at Henchir-Belaiet in Tunisia, and has given its name to the town of Zaghouan nearby.

The ancient town was located at 36.393555, 10.1390015 and flourished from 330 BC – AD 640, with the Muslim conquest of the Maghreb. The town was the cathedra of a bishopric. which survives today as a titular bishopric of the Catholic province of Proconsolare; with Silvio José Báez Ortega of Nicaragua as the current bishop.

The diocese was nominally restored in 1933 as Latin Titular bishopric of Zica (Latin = Curiate Italian) / Zicen(sis) (Latin adjective).

It has had the following incumbents, of the fitting Episcopal (lowest) rank, with an archiepiscopal exception:

- Titular Archbishop: Marius-Félix-Antoine Maziers (1966.01.24 – 1968.02.05) as Coadjutor Archbishop of Bordeaux (France) (1966.01.24 – 1968.02.05); next Metropolitan Archbishop of Bordeaux (France) (1968.02.05 – retired 1989.05.31), died 2008; previously Titular Bishop of Augustopolis in Phrygia (1959.12.17 – 1966.01.24) as Auxiliary Bishop of Archdiocese of Lyon (France) (1959.12.17 – 1966.01.24)
- Christopher Mwoleka (1969.03.06 – 1969.06.26) as Auxiliary Bishop of Diocese of Rulenge (Tanzania) (1969.03.06 – succession 1969.06.26); next Bishop of Rulenge (1969.06.26 – 1996.11.08), died 2002
- Joachim Mbadu Kikhela Kupika (1975.01.30 – 1975.11.22) as Coadjutor Bishop of Boma (Congo-Kinshasa) (1975.01.30 – 1975.11.22); next Bishop of Boma (1975.11.22 – retired 2001.05.21), emeritate as Titular Bishop of Belesasa (2001.05.21 – ...)
- Francisco Capiral San Diego (1983.06.06 – 1995.07.12)
- Luigi Locati (1995.12.15 – 2005.07.14)
- Silvio José Báez Ortega, OCD (2009.04.09 – ...) as Auxiliary Bishop of Archdiocese of Managua (Nicaragua) (2009.04.09 – ...)
