= Robelo =

Robelo is a surname. Notable people with the surname include:

- Alfonso Robelo (born 1939), Nicaraguan businessman
- César Bosco Vivas Robelo (1941–2020), Nicaraguan bishop
