= Diocese of Estelí =

Roman Catholic diocese in Nicaragua

Coordinates: 13.0930°N 86.3557°W

Diocese of Esteli Dioecesis Esteliensis
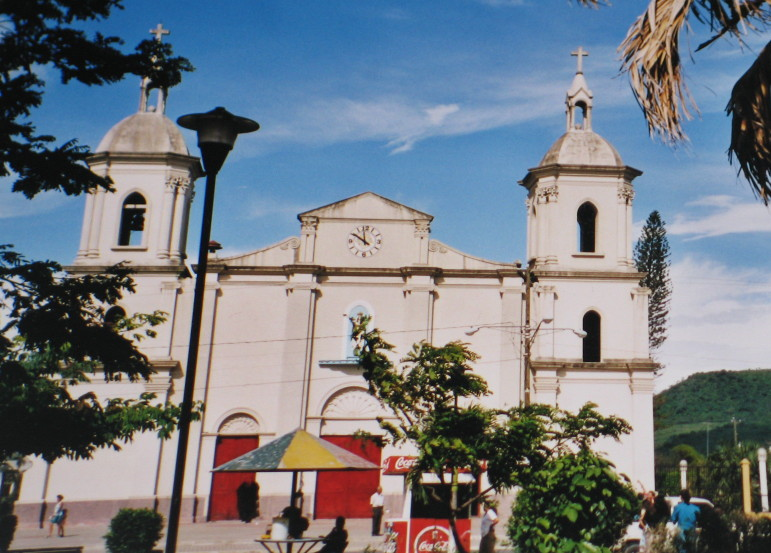
- Catedral Nuestra Señora del Santísimo Rosario

Location
- Country: Nicaragua
- Ecclesiastical province: Province of Managua
- Metropolitan: Leopoldo José Brenes Solórzano

Statistics
- Area: 7,298 km^{2} (2,818 sq mi)
- Population: Total; Catholics: (as of 2020); 1,416,000; 1,143,000 (80.7%)
- Parishes: 43

Information
- Denomination: Roman Catholic
- Rite: Roman Rite
- Established: 17 December 1962 (63 years ago)
- Cathedral: Cathedral of Our Lady of the Most Holy Rosary

Current leadership
- Pope: Leo XIV
- Bishop: Vacant
- Apostolic Administrator: Rolando José Álvarez Lagos
- Bishops emeritus: Juan Abelardo Mata Guevara, S.D.B., Rubén López Ardón

Map
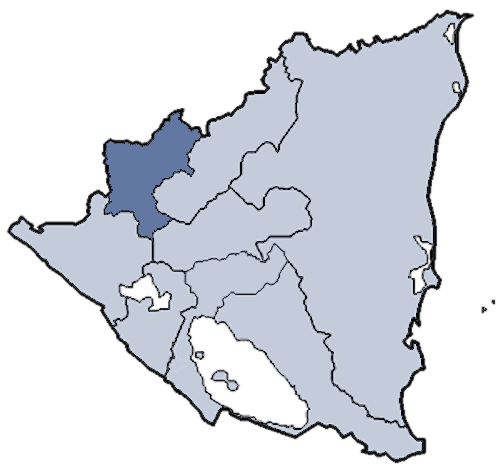

The Roman Catholic Diocese of Esteli (erected 17 December 1962) is a suffragan of the Archdiocese of Managua.

== Ordinaries ==
- Clemente Carranza y López (12 January 1963 – 7 February 1978)
  - Julián Luis Barni Spotti, O.F.M. (8 February 1978 – June 1979), Apostolic Administrator
- Rubén López Ardón (2 January 1979 – 6 March 1990)
- Juan Abelardo Mata Guevara, S.D.B. (6 March 1990 – 6 July 2021)
  - Rolando José Álvarez Lagos (since 6 July 2021), Apostolic Administrator

== External links and references ==
- "Diocese of Esteli". Catholic-Hierarchy.
