= Our Lady of the Assumption Cathedral, Granada =

Coordinates: 11.92985°N 85.95333°W

Our Lady of the Assumption Cathedral
- Catedral de Nuestra Señora de la Asunción
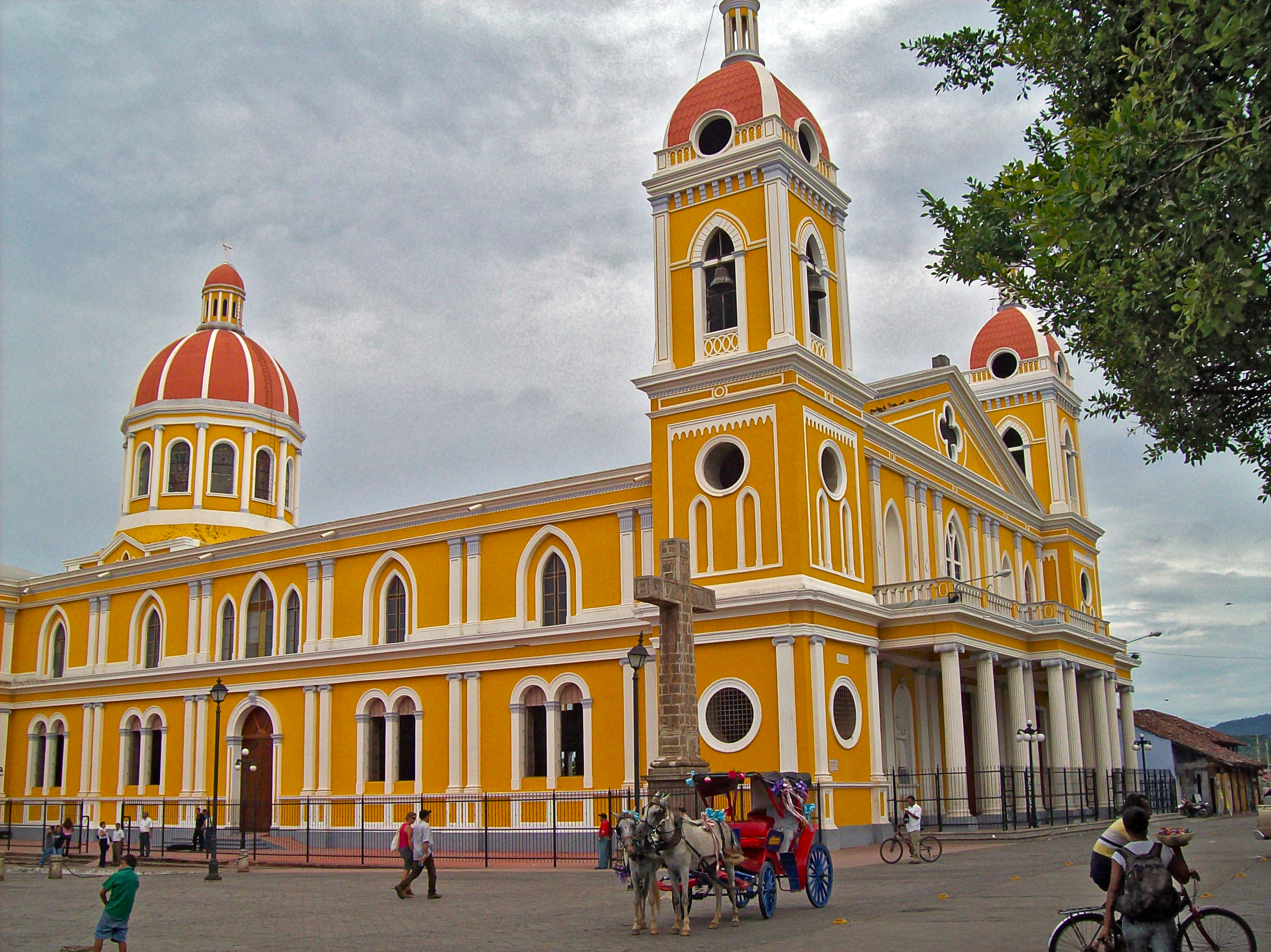
- Our Lady of the Assumption Cathedral
- Location: Granada
- Country: Nicaragua
- Denomination: Roman Catholic Church

Administration
- Diocese: Granada

The Our Lady of the Assumption Cathedral (Spanish: Catedral de Nuestra Señora de la Asunción) also called Granada Cathedral is a neoclassical Catholic cathedral located in Granada, Nicaragua, 40 kilometres (25 mi) southeast of Managua. The church is the main temple of the Diocese of Granada, and its bishop is Jorge Solórzano Pérez.

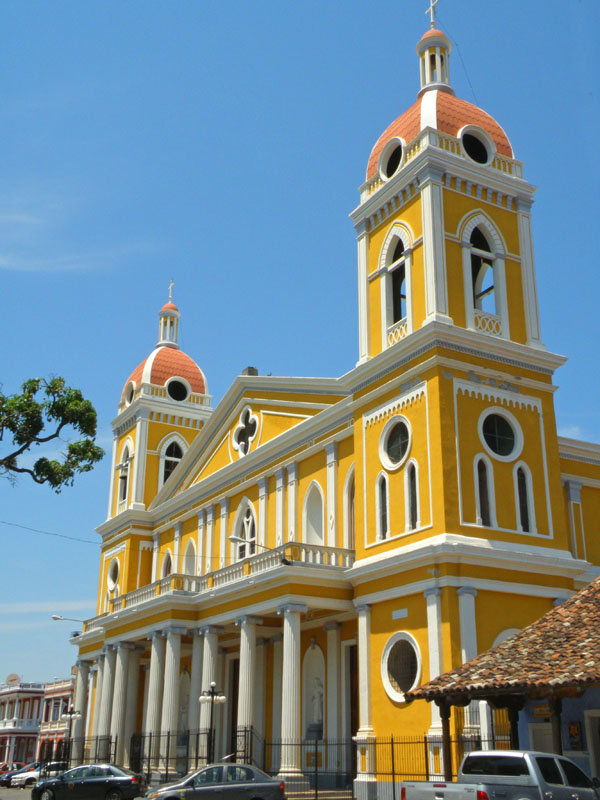
Another view

The first cathedral temple was built around 1525 with tapicel and rafaz stone, brick, lime and straw roof. By 1578, the church had already been burned twice. Seven years later, in 1585, it started to become known colloquially as "La Iglesia Bonita," or "The Beautiful Church." The second temple was completed in about 1751 with lime, stone, and brick.

In 1916, the iron frame intended for the central dome was brought from the United States, only three years after the Diocese of Granada was created by the Roman Catholic Church. By 1928, with the dome already built, the cathedral was nevertheless one of a few in any Latin American city with one tower only.

According to historian and poet Francisco Obando Somarriba in his book " La Primera Dama del Liberalismo (page 58, Chapter XIII), it was in that same year when the Bishop of Granada, His Eminence Canuto José Reyes y Balladares, a stern member of the Conservative Party, denied the eucharistial gift of communion to Doña Angelica Balladares Montealegre de Arguello Vargas, her distant relative, during a Mass commemorating Palm Sunday, the Bishop's motive being that she had actively participated in the 1926-27 Constitutional War, won by the Liberals. After the Bishop rectified, giving her the rite, albeit privately and minutes later, at the Sacristy, she then showed her exquisiteness by requesting Nicaraguan President José María Moncada Tapia, her close friend and Liberal Party ally, to grant the Bishop, and through him, the Diocesis and City of Granada the funds so that the missing tower could be finally built, a process which was completed by late 1931.

The cathedral has a total area of 3,614.87 m^{2} (38,910 sq ft).

== See also ==
- Roman Catholicism in Nicaragua
- Our Lady of the Assumption Church (disambiguation)
