= Roman Catholic Diocese of Granada =

Roman Catholic diocese in Nicaragua

Diocese of Granada Dioecesis Granadensis Diócesis de Granada
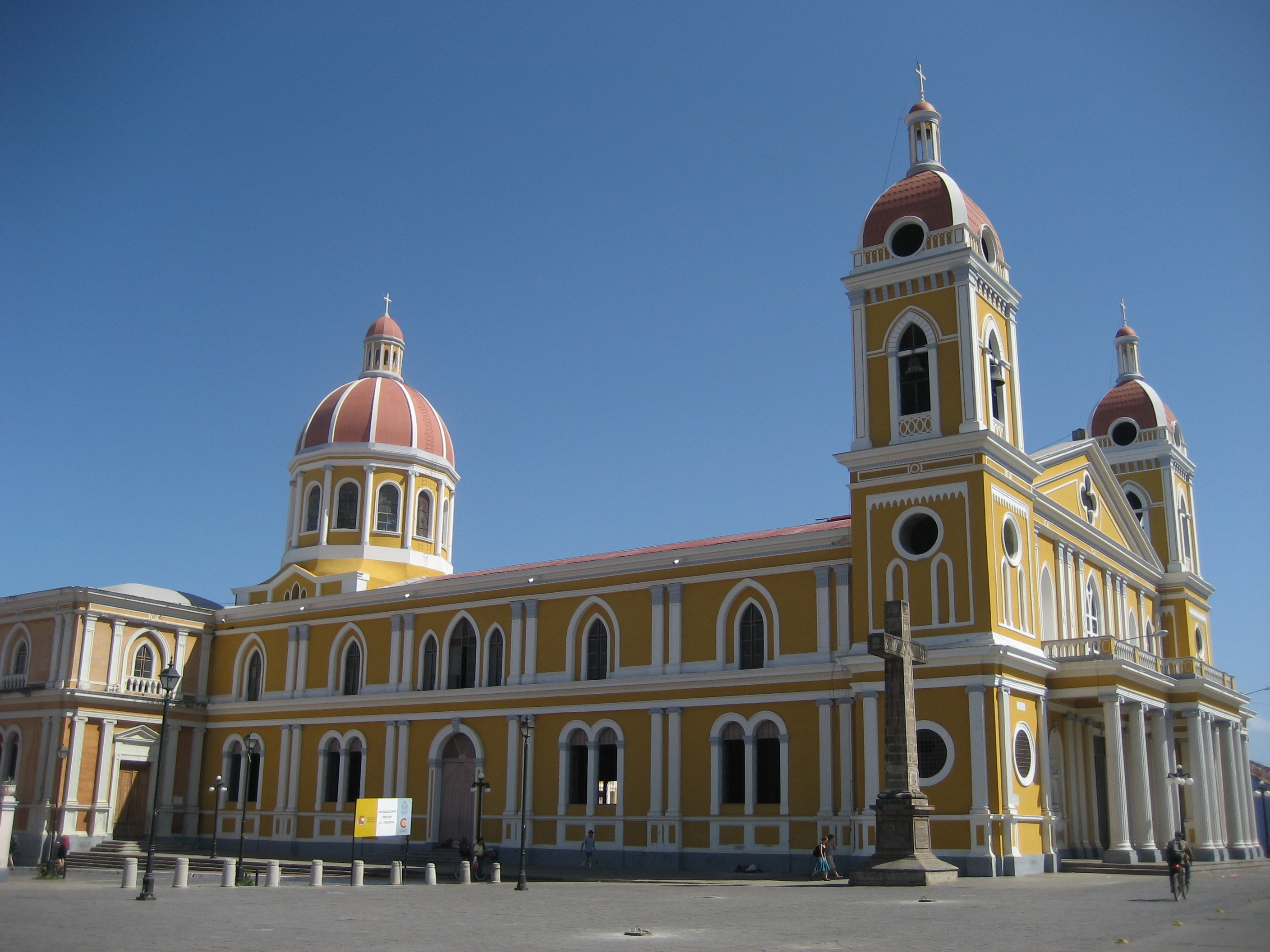
- Catedral Nuestra Señora de la Asunción

Location
- Country: Nicaragua
- Ecclesiastical province: Province of Managua
- Metropolitan: Leopoldo José Brenes Solórzano

Statistics
- Area: 7,453 km^{2} (2,878 sq mi)
- Population: Total; Catholics: (as of 2022); 654,190; 591,540 (90.4%)
- Parishes: 64

Information
- Denomination: Roman Catholic
- Rite: Roman Rite
- Established: 2 December 1913 (112 years ago)
- Cathedral: Cathedral of Our Lady of the Assumption

Current leadership
- Pope: Leo XIV
- Bishop: Jorge Solórzano Pérez
- Bishops emeritus: Bernardo Hombach Lütkermeier

Map
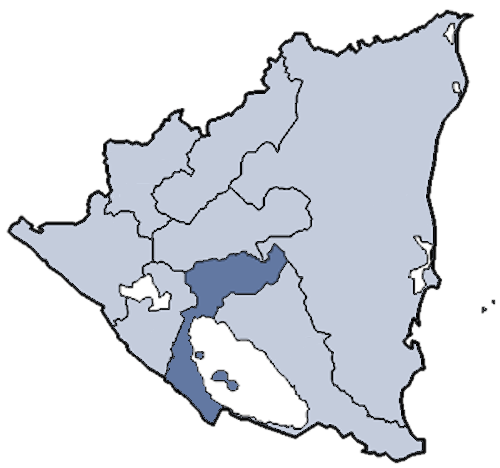

The Roman Catholic Diocese of Granada (erected 2 December 1913) in Nicaragua is a suffragan of the Archdiocese of Managua.

== Bishops ==
=== Ordinaries ===
- José Candida Piñol y Batres (1913–1915)
- Canuto José Reyes y Balladares (1915–1951)
- Marco Antonio García y Suárez (1953–1972)
- Leovigildo López Fitoria, C.M. (1972–2003)
- Bernardo Hombach Lütkermeier (2003–2010)
- Jorge Solórzano Pérez (since 2010)

=== Auxiliary bishop ===
- Carlos de la Trinidad Borge y Castrillo (1945-1953), appointed Auxiliary Bishop of Managua

=== Other priests of this diocese who became bishops ===
- René Sócrates Sándigo Jirón, appointed Bishop of Juigalpa in 2004
- Marcial Humberto Guzmán Saballo, appointed Bishop of Juigalpa in 2020

== Territorial losses ==
Year	Along with	To form
1962		Territorial Prelature of Juigalpa

== External links and references ==
- "Diocese of Granada". Catholic-Hierarchy.
