= Silvio José Báez =

Nicaraguan Catholic priest (born 1958)

The Most Reverend Silvio José Báez Ortega OCD
- Auxiliary Bishop of Managua
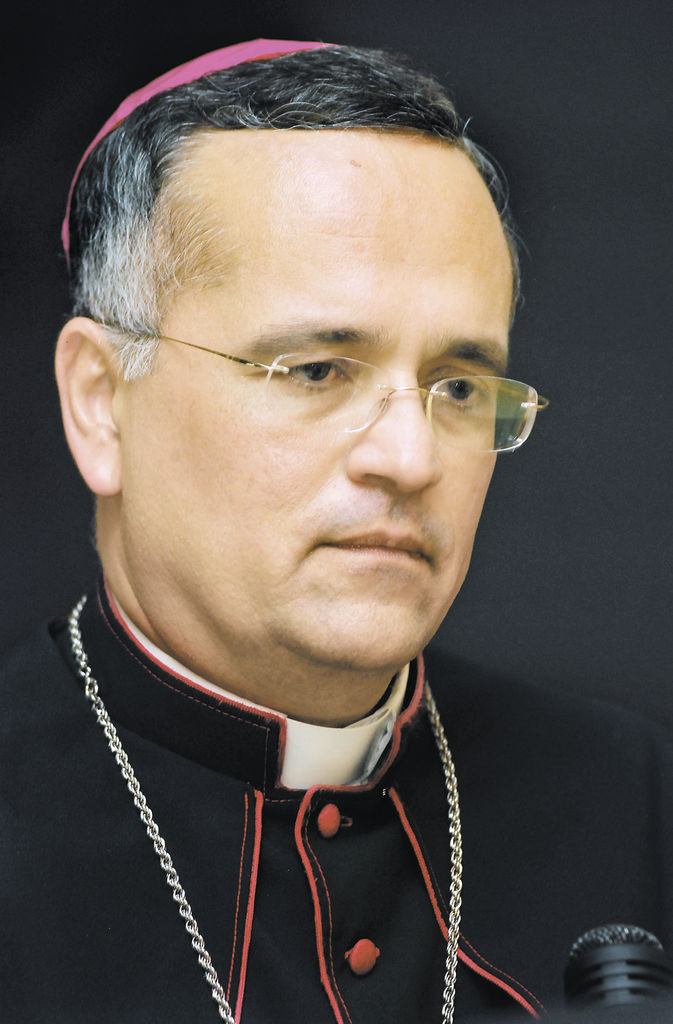
- Báez in 2018
- Church: Roman Catholic Church
- Archdiocese: Managua
- See: Managua
- Appointed: 9 April 2009
- Predecessor: Jorge Solórzano Pérez
- Other post: Titular Bishop of Zica (2009-)
- Previous post: Secretary General of the Nicaraguan Episcopal Conference (2011-14)

Orders
- Ordination: 15 January 1985
- Consecration: 30 May 2009 by Leopoldo José Brenes Solórzano

Personal details
- Born: Silvio José Báez Ortega; 28 April 1958 (age 68) Masaya, Nicaragua
- Education: Central American University; Pontifical Biblical Institute; Pontifical Gregorian University; École Biblique
- Motto: Por Tu palabra
- Coat of arms

Styles of Silvio José Báez Ortega, OCD
- Reference style: His Excellency
- Spoken style: Your Excellency
- Religious style: Bishop

Silvio José Báez Ortega, OCD (born 28 April 1958) is a Nicaraguan Discalced Carmelite and a prelate of the Catholic Church. He earned a doctorate from the Pontifical Gregorian University, and then served primarily in Guatemala and the Vatican from 1989 to 2009. In 2009, Pope Benedict XVI appointed him an auxiliary bishop of the Archdiocese of Managua. He left Nicaragua and went into exile in April 2019 after receiving threats against his life.

== Early life ==
Báez was born on 28 April 1958 in Masaya, Nicaragua. He attended Salesian High School in Masaya, then the Central American University (UCA) in Managua, where he studied engineering, before leaving university in 1979 to enroll at the seminary of the Discalced Carmelites in Costa Rica. He completed his studies in philosophy and theology at the Theological Institute of Central America in San Jose, Costa Rica.

== Ordination and academic career ==
Báez was ordained on 15 January 1984 in San Ramón, Alajuela, Costa Rica. He then earned a degree in Sacred Scripture at the Pontifical Biblical Institute. He next served in Guatemala as Rector of the Seminary of the Discalced Carmelite Fathers. Returning to Rome he completed his doctoral studies in Sacred Scripture and Exegesis at the Pontifical Gregorian University. He also took specialized courses at the École Biblique in Jerusalem.

Over the next decade he held a variety of academic positions: at the University "Francisco Marroquín" of Guatemala (1989–1994), at the University "Rafael Landívar" in Guatemala (1989–1991), and at the Major Seminary La Asunción in Guatemala (1991–1992), as Professor of Biblical Spirituality at the Pontifical University Urbaniana in Rome (2002). He joined the faculty of the Pontifical Theological Faculty Teresianum in 1994, becoming vice-president of the faculty and editor of the theology journal Teresianum.

== Auxiliary bishop of Managua ==
On 9 April 2009 Pope Benedict XVI named Báez titular bishop of Zica and auxiliary bishop of Managua. He has served as the Vicar General of the Archdiocese of Managua, presiding bishop of the commission on Consecrated life and presiding bishop of the Seminary of the Episcopal Conference of Nicaragua.

Báez and other Catholic leaders in Nicaragua have served as intermediaries between protestors and the administration of President Daniel Ortega since a wave of anti-government protests began in April 2018. He along with Cardinal Leopoldo Brenes Solorzano of Managua, Archbishop Waldemar Sommertag, the Apostolic Nuncio, and other clergy, was injured by pro-government paramilitary forces on 9 July 2018 while attempting to protect St. Sebastian Basilica in Diriamba and free anti-government protesters who had taken refuge inside. The clerical delegation had traveled to Diriamba following the killing of 17 people in the area on 7 and 8 July. Báez was vocal in his criticism of violent repression by the Ortega government. In October 2018, Ortega and his supporters accused Báez of plotting a coup. Government employees reported being forced to sign a letter reiterating the allegations and asking Pope Francis to recall Báez. an investigation by the Spanish newspaper El Español found that the audiotape produced as evidence against Báez had been doctored.

On 4 April 2019, Báez met privately with Pope Francis. On 10 April, Báez announced that Pope Francis had asked him to come to Rome indefinitely. Báez also confirmed that U.S. Ambassador to Nicaragua Laura Farnsworth Dogu told him in 2018 that he was the target of an assassination plot. He retains his title. He currently serves as Professor of Scripture on the faculty of St. Vincent de Paul Regional Seminary, Boynton Beach, USA.

In 2023, Báez was stripped of his Nicaraguan citizenship.

In 2025, Báez was the recipient of the Pacem in Terris Peace and Freedom Award in recognition of his "commitment as a shepherd of the poor and a courageous defender of human rights and democracy who had endured physical injury and threats to your life while pursuing mediation between government and pro-democracy forces in your beloved Nicaragua..."
