= Bernhard Hombach =

German-born Nicaraguan Roman Catholic bishop (born 1933)

The Most Reverend Bernhard Hombach
- Bishop of Granada
- Church: Catholic Church
- Diocese: Granada
- Appointed: 15 December 2003
- Installed: 7 February 2004
- Term ended: 11 March 2010
- Predecessor: Leovigildo López Fitoria
- Successor: Jorge Solórzano Pérez
- Previous post: Bishop of Juigalpa (1995–2003)

Orders
- Ordination: 28 June 1961
- Consecration: 22 April 1995 by Miguel Obando y Bravo

Personal details
- Born: Bernhard Hombach; 12 September 1933 (age 93) Krefeld, Germany
- Education: Catholic University of Leuven
- Motto: Justicia y Paz

Bernhard Hombach (born 12 September 1933), also known as Bernardo Hombach Lütkermeier, is a German-born Roman Catholic prelate who served as Bishop of Juigalpa from 1995 to 2003 and as Bishop of Granada in Nicaragua from 2003 to 2010.

== Early life and priesthood ==
Hombach was born in Krefeld, Diocese of Aachen, Germany, on 12 September 1933. He studied philosophy in Trier and theology at the University of Leuven in Belgium. He was ordained a priest in Leuven on 28 June 1961.

As a priest, Hombach served as a fidei donum missionary in several countries, including Argentina, Peru, Nigeria, Venezuela and Nicaragua. He also served as vicar general of the Archdiocese of Paderborn in Germany and of the Diocese of Juigalpa in Nicaragua. By the time of his appointment to the episcopate, he had been engaged in pastoral work in Nicaragua for 18 years.

== Work in Nicaragua ==
Hombach worked in Nicaragua before becoming a bishop and was associated with Caritas's social-pastoral work in the country. In 1995, a contemporary library record described him as responsible for Caritas in Nicaragua. Its account noted that a Caritas literacy programme, begun in 1993, had received a UNESCO honour and was intended to provide literacy education for 25,000 adults and training for 3,100 volunteer teachers. By the end of its first year, 9,000 people had reportedly been taught to read and write, with total enrolment of 14,771.

== Episcopate ==
=== Bishop of Juigalpa ===
On 28 February 1995, Pope John Paul II appointed Hombach bishop of Juigalpa, Nicaragua. The appointment was published in the Holy See's official journal, Acta Apostolicae Sedis, which described him as a priest of the Archdiocese of Paderborn and, at the time, director of Caritas in Nicaragua.

He received episcopal consecration on 22 April 1995. Miguel Obando y Bravo, Archbishop of Managua, was the principal consecrator, with Johannes Joachim Degenhardt, Archbishop of Paderborn, and César Bosco Vivas Robelo, Bishop of León in Nicaragua, as principal co-consecrators.

=== Bishop of Granada ===
On 15 December 2003, Pope John Paul II appointed Hombach Bishop of Granada, succeeding Leovigildo López Fitoria. The Holy See stated that Hombach had previously been Bishop of Juigalpa and that he was born in Krefeld, had studied philosophy in Trier and theology at Leuven, and had served as a fidei donum priest in several countries.

Hombach subsequently served as Bishop of Granada until his resignation was accepted by Pope Benedict XVI on 11 March 2010. He was succeeded by Jorge Solórzano Pérez, previously Bishop of Matagalpa.

== Public positions ==
During his episcopate, Hombach occasionally commented publicly on political and social issues in Nicaragua. In September 2007, La Prensa reported that he opposed a general amnesty for former presidents Arnoldo Alemán and Enrique Bolaños and former government minister Eduardo Montealegre, arguing that their cases should be addressed through legal proceedings. He distinguished such proposals from humanitarian amnesties for prisoners suffering from illness or advanced age and called for a referendum in connection with a controversy over constitutional reforms.

In a 2017 interview with La Prensa, Hombach discussed the relationship between the Catholic Church and the Nicaraguan state. He argued that the Church and state should maintain an open relationship while avoiding institutional dependence and state privileges for the Church. He also discussed freedom, democracy, elections and the role of the Church in public life.

== See also ==
- Roman Catholic Diocese of Granada
- Roman Catholic Diocese of Juigalpa
