= Rubén López Ardón =

Nicaraguan Roman Catholic bishop (born 1934)

His Excellency, The Most Reverend Rubén López Ardón
- Bishop Emeritus of Estelí
- Church: Roman Catholic Church
- Archdiocese: Managua
- Diocese: Estelí
- Appointed: 2 January 1979
- Term ended: 6 March 1990
- Predecessor: Clemente Carranza y López
- Successor: Juan Abelardo Mata Guevara

Orders
- Ordination: 22 December 1961
- Consecration: 27 May 1979 by Pope John Paul II, Duraisamy Simon Lourdusamy and Eduardo Martínez Somalo

Personal details
- Born: 19 June 1934 (age 92) Ocotal, Nicaragua

Rubén López Ardón (born 19 June 1934) is a Nicaraguan Roman Catholic prelate who served as Bishop of the Diocese of Estelí from 1979 until his resignation in 1990.

== Early life and priesthood ==
Rubén López Ardón was born on 19 June 1934 in Ocotal, Nicaragua. He was ordained to the priesthood on 22 December 1961 for the Diocese of León in Nicaragua.

Following the establishment of the Diocese of Estelí in 1962, he became one of its priests. During his priestly ministry he served as rector of the National Seminary, national adviser to the Episcopal Commission for the Liturgy, Executive Secretary of the Nicaraguan Episcopal Conference, and Vicar General of the Diocese of Estelí at the time of his appointment to the episcopate.

In 1986, Pope John Paul II appointed López Ardón a consultor of the Congregation for Divine Worship.

== Bishop of Estelí and later life ==
On 2 January 1979, Pope John Paul II appointed López Ardón Bishop of Estelí. He received episcopal consecration on 27 May 1979 in St. Peter's Basilica, Rome, from Pope John Paul II, with Archbishops Duraisamy Simon Lourdusamy and Eduardo Martínez Somalo serving as principal co-consecrators.

López Ardón's episcopate coincided with the Nicaraguan Revolution and the subsequent Contra War. The Diocese of Estelí was among the regions most affected by the armed conflict, creating significant pastoral and administrative challenges for the local Church.

According to La Prensa, the prolonged pressures of governing the diocese during the civil conflict, together with declining physical and mental health, contributed to his decision to seek retirement from the pastoral governance of the diocese.

Pope John Paul II accepted his resignation on 6 March 1990. He was succeeded by Juan Abelardo Mata Guevara.

Following his resignation, López Ardón left Nicaragua and settled in Mexico. According to La Prensa, he subsequently withdrew from public ecclesiastical ministry and maintained little contact with his former diocese.
