= San Giovanni Evangelista a Spinaceto =

St. John the Evangelist in Spinaceto
- Chiesa di San Giovanni Evangelista a Spinaceto (in Italian); Sancti Ioannis Evangelistæ in Spinaceto (in Latin)
- Click on the map for a fullscreen view
- 41°47′09″N 12°26′38″E
- Location: Via Raffaele Aversa 44, Spinaceto, Rome
- Country: Italy
- Denomination: Roman Catholic
- Tradition: Roman Rite

History
- Status: Titular church
- Dedication: John the Evangelist

Architecture
- Architectural type: Church

Administration
- District: Lazio
- Province: Rome

The church of San Giovanni Evangelista a Spinaceto is a church in Rome, in Appio-Claudio District via Raffaele Aversa. Pope John Paul II created it as a cardinal title of San Giovanni Evangelista a Spinaceto and Miguel Obando Bravo as its first titular cardinal.

== List of Cardinal Protectors ==
- Miguel Obando Bravo (25 May 1985 – 3 June 2018)
- Álvaro Leonel Ramazzini Imeri (5 October 2019 - present)
