= Arthur J. Jackson =

American Medal of Honor recipient (1924–2017)

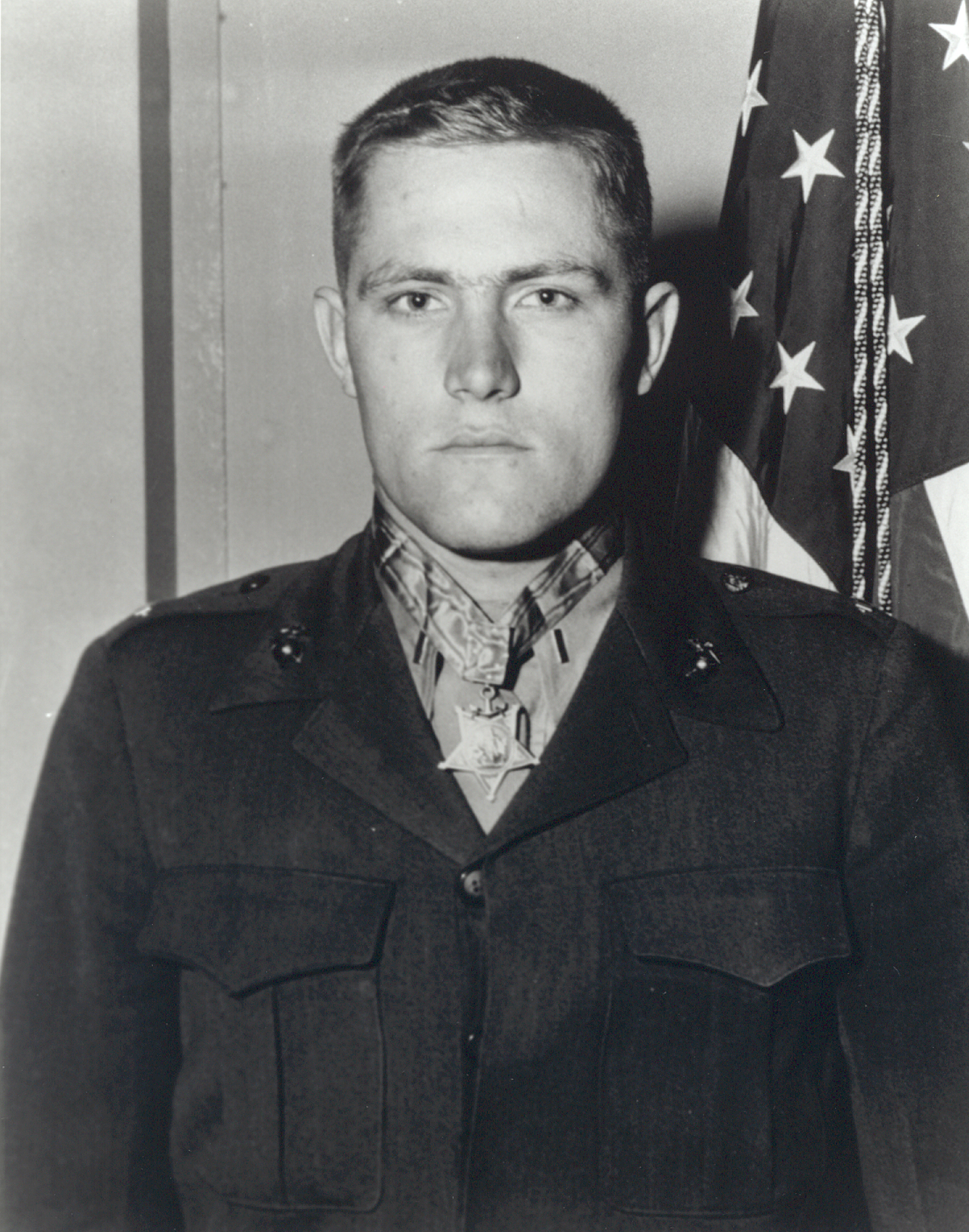
- Born: October 18, 1924; Cleveland, Ohio
- Died: June 14, 2017 (aged 92); Boise, Idaho
- Burial place: Idaho State Veterans Cemetery, Boise, Idaho
- Military career
- Allegiance: United States
- Branch: United States Marine Corps; United States Army
- Service years: 1943–1984
- Rank: Captain
- Unit: 3rd Battalion, 7th Marines
- Conflicts: World War II: Battle of Cape Gloucester; Battle of Peleliu; Battle of Okinawa; Korean War
- Awards: Medal of Honor; Purple Heart (2)

Captain Arthur Junior Jackson (October 18, 1924 – June 14, 2017) was a United States Marine who received the Medal of Honor for his actions on Peleliu during World War II. At the age of 19, PFC Jackson single-handedly destroyed 12 enemy pillboxes and killed 50 enemy soldiers. He was also the last surviving recipient of the Medal of Honor from the Battle of Peleliu.

On September 30, 1961, while serving at the Guantanamo Bay Naval Base, Jackson fatally shot a Cuban worker named Rubén Sabariego, who he suspected was a communist spy, in self-defense after Sabariego attacked him. He eventually buried the body in a shallow grave, but word leaked out. He left the Marine Corps in 1962 after being denied a court-martial to clear his name.

== Early years ==
Arthur J. Jackson was born in Cleveland, Ohio, on October 18, 1924. He grew up in Canton, Ohio and moved to Portland, Oregon with his parents in 1939 during the depression, and graduated from Grant High School there. After graduation, he worked in Alaska for a naval construction company until November 1942, when he returned to Portland and enlisted in the United States Marine Corps at the age of 18.

== Military service ==
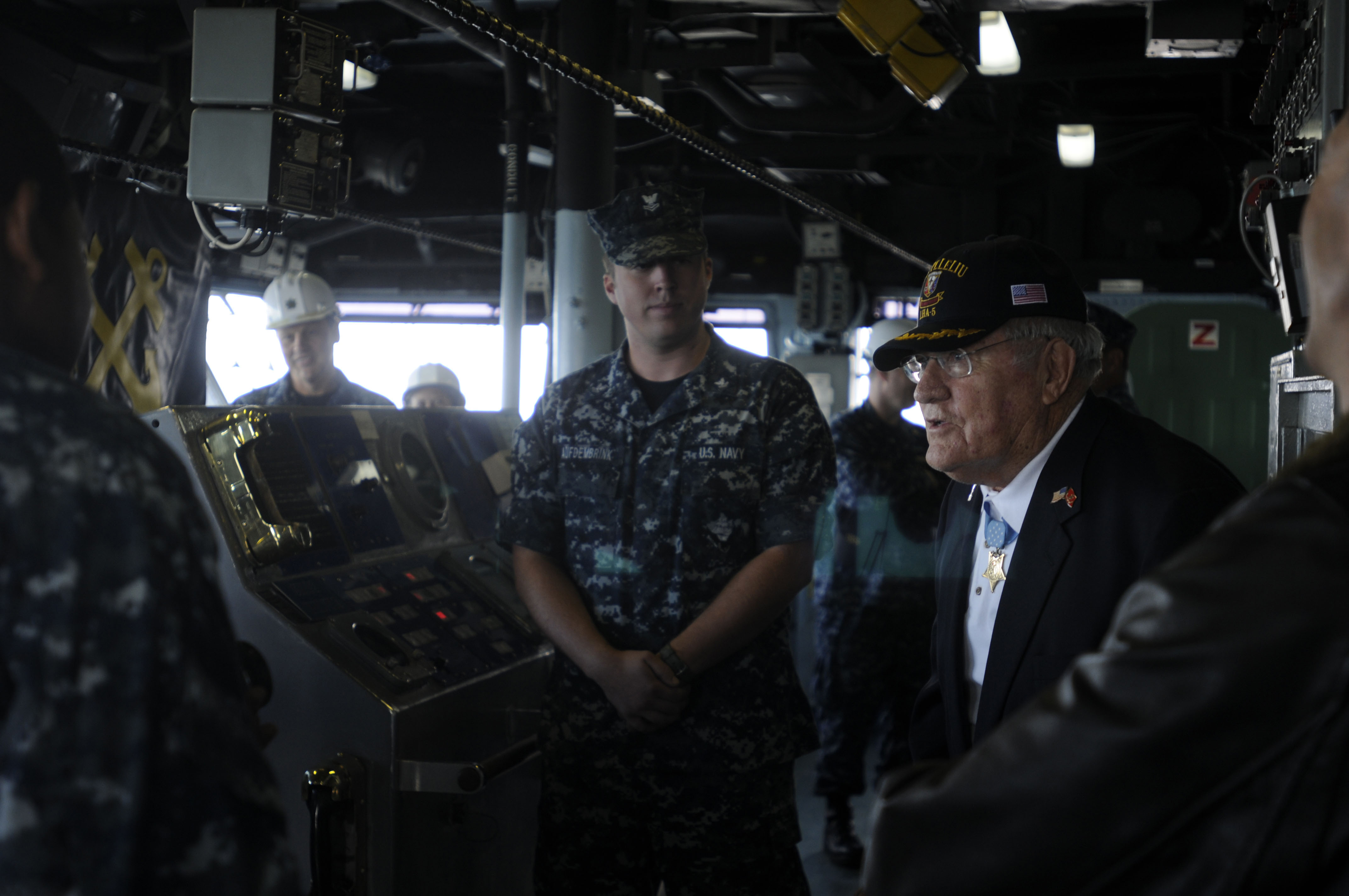
Jackson (right) speaks to sailors aboard the USS Peleliu in 2011

=== World War II ===
In January 1943, he began his recruit training at Marine Corps Recruit Depot San Diego, California, and soon thereafter joined the 1st Marine Division in Melbourne, Australia in June 1943. On January 13, 1944, while taking part in the Cape Gloucester campaign, he carried a wounded Marine to safety in the face of well-entrenched Japanese troops on the slope of a steep hill, saving the man's life. For this action, he was awarded a Letter of Commendation.

Following this, while serving with the 3rd Battalion, 7th Marines as a Private First Class, he took part in the fighting and was wounded on Peleliu — for his heroic actions in that battle, he was awarded the Medal of Honor and was awarded his first Purple Heart. He again went into combat on Okinawa where, as a platoon sergeant with the 1st Marine Division, he was again wounded in action on May 18, 1945. That August, he was commissioned as a Marine second lieutenant.

During ceremonies at the White House on October 5, 1945, President Harry S. Truman presented him with the nation's highest combat award — the Medal of Honor.

=== Post-war ===
Following the war, he served in northern China during the post-war occupation of that country. On his return to the United States, he returned briefly to civilian life, but, shortly after, entered the United States Army Reserve where, in 1954, he reached the rank of captain. Although he served with the army during the Korean War, he returned to the Marine Corps in 1959.

=== Guantanamo shooting ===
On the night of September 30, 1961, while serving at the Guantanamo Bay Naval Base, during a night of heavy drinking, Jackson claimed he discovered Rubén López Sabariego, a Cuban bus driver at Guantanamo he suspected was a communist spy, in a restricted area. On his own initiative, he and his executive officer, First Lieutenant William Szili, took López to a long-unused gate with the intention of removing him from the base. When they found the gate locked, Jackson sent Szili to find something to break the lock. When Szili returned, Jackson claimed that López attacked him and that he had to fatally shoot him with his .45 sidearm in self-defense. Jackson first threw the body over a cliff, then recovered it with Szili's assistance the next day and buried it in a shallow grave, but word leaked out. When his request for a court-martial to clear his name was denied, Jackson left the Corps in 1962.

He remained active in the Army Reserves and eventually retired from that service in 1984. He also worked for the United States Postal Service.

Jackson lived in Boise, Idaho, during his retirement, and died at a hospital there on June 14, 2017, at the age of 92.

== Medal of Honor citation ==
=== Medal of Honor citation ===
The President of the United States takes pleasure in presenting the MEDAL OF HONOR to

PRIVATE FIRST CLASS ARTHUR J. JACKSON
UNITED STATES MARINE CORPS

for service as set forth in the following CITATION:

For conspicuous gallantry and intrepidity at the risk of his life above and beyond the call of duty while serving with the Third Battalion, Seventh Marines, First Marine Division, in action against enemy Japanese forces on the Island of Peleliu in the Palau Group, September 18, 1944. Boldly taking the initiative when his platoon's left flank advance was held up by the fire of Japanese troops concealed in strongly fortified positions, Private First Class Jackson unhesitatingly proceeded forward of our lines and, courageously defying the heavy barrages, charged a large pillbox housing approximately thirty-five enemy soldiers. Pouring his automatic fire into the opening of the fixed installation to trap the occupying troops, he hurled white phosphorus grenades and explosive charges brought up by a fellow Marine, demolishing the pillbox and killing all of the enemy. Advancing alone under the continuous fire from other hostile emplacements, he employed a similar means to smash two smaller positions in the immediate vicinity. Determined to crush the entire pocket of resistance although harassed on all sides by the shattering blasts of Japanese weapons and covered only by small rifle parties, he stormed one gun position after another, dealing death and destruction to the savagely fighting enemy in his inexorable drive against the remaining defenses and succeeded in wiping out a total of twelve pillboxes and fifty Japanese soldiers. Stouthearted and indomitable despite the terrific odds, Private First Class Jackson resolutely maintained control of the platoon's left flank movement throughout his valiant one-man assault and, by his cool decision and relentless fighting spirit during a critical situation, contributed essentially to the complete annihilation of the enemy in the southern sector of the island. His gallant initiative and heroic conduct in the face of extreme peril reflect the highest credit upon Private First Class Jackson and the United States Naval Service.

/S/ HARRY S. TRUMAN

== Awards and decorations ==

Badge	Combat Infantryman Badge		
1st row	Medal of Honor		Purple Heart with one Oak Leaf Cluster
2nd row	Combat Action Ribbon	Army Commendation Medal	Navy Commendation Medal with 'V' device
3rd row	Army Reserve Achievement Medal	China Service Medal	American Campaign Medal
4th row	Asiatic-Pacific Campaign Medal with three campaign stars	World War II Victory Medal	Navy Occupation Service Medal with 'Asia' clasp
5th row	National Defense Service Medal with one service star	Korean Service Medal with two campaign stars	Armed Forces Reserve Medal with bronze hourglass
6th row	Army Service Ribbon	United Nations Korea Medal	Korean War Service Medal
Unit awards	Presidential Unit Citation		
Unit awards	Navy Presidential Unit Citation	Meritorious Unit Commendation	Korean Presidential Unit Citation

== See also ==
- List of Medal of Honor recipients
- List of Medal of Honor recipients for World War II

== Bibliography ==
- Sloan, Bill (2005). Brotherhood of Heroes — The Marines at Peleliu, 1944 — The Bloodiest Battle of the Pacific War. New York: Simon & Schuster Press. ISBN 978-0-7432-6009-1. LCCN 2004065316.
