= Religion in Nicaragua =

Religion in Nicaragua (2020)
1. Catholicism (44.9%)
2. Evangelicalism (Note: Including baptists (0.6%) and pentecostals (3.4%)) (38.2%)
3. Unaffiliated (Note: Including agnostics (0.1%) and atheists (0.3%)) (14.1%)
4. Other (Note: Including adventists (0.5%), Jehovahs witnesses (0.6%), Mormons (0.6%), believer unspecified (1%) and not answered (0.2%)) (2.80%)

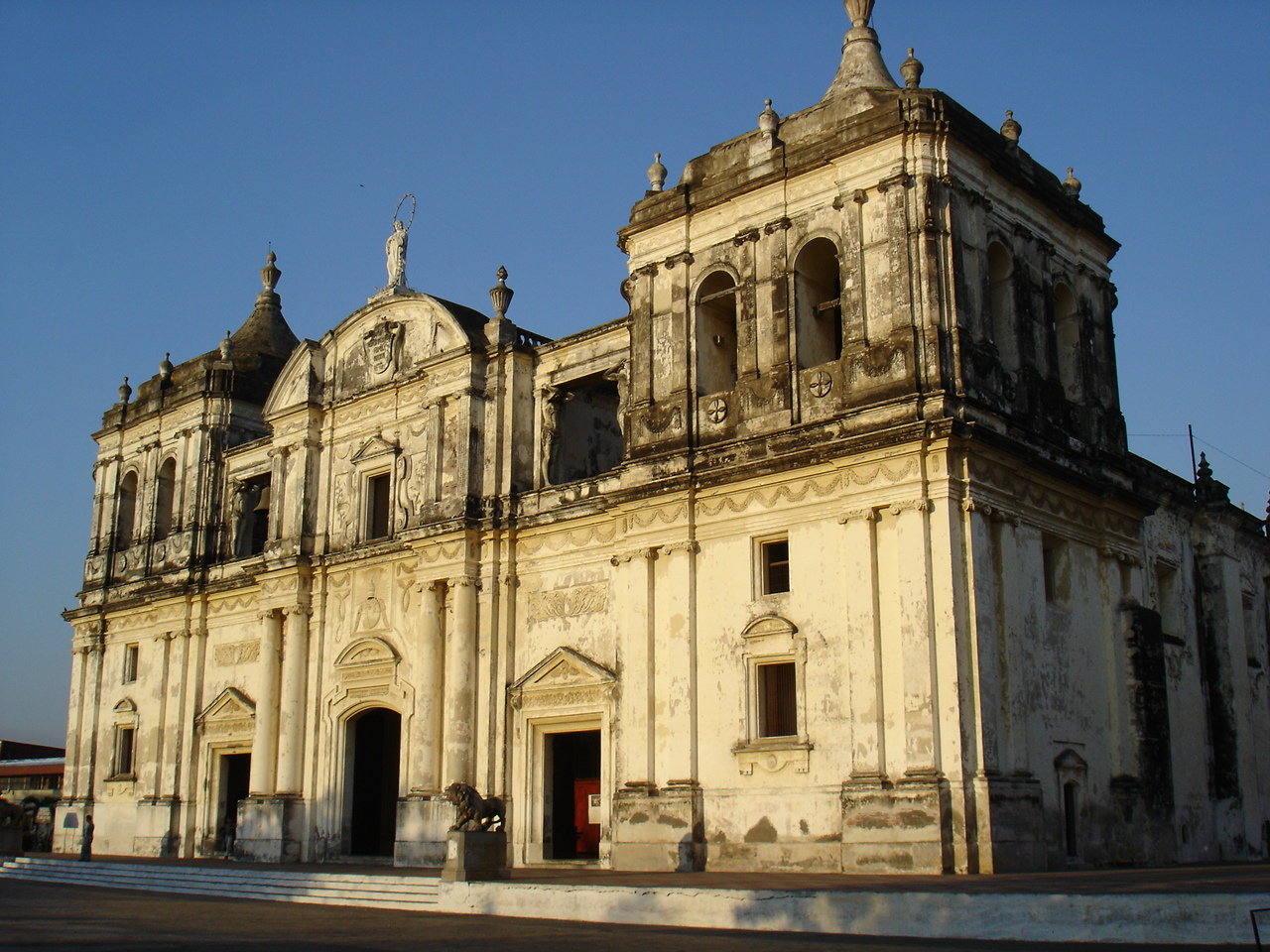
The León Cathedral is one of Nicaragua's World Heritage Sites.

Religion in Nicaragua is predominantly Christian and forms a significant part of the culture of the country as well as its constitution. Religious freedom and religious tolerance is promoted by the Nicaraguan constitution yet the government has in recent years detained, imprisoned, and likely tortured numerous Catholic leaders, according to multiple news outlets. As of 2020, more than 80% of the population is Christian. In 2025, M&R Consultores found that 38.3% identified as Protestant and 28.3% as Catholic.

== History ==
Life in Nicaragua

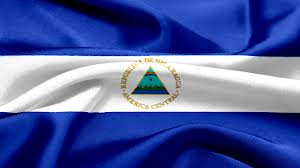

Cuisine
Culture
Demographics
Education
Holidays
Human Rights
Literature
Music
Politics
Religion
Tourism

=== Catholicism ===
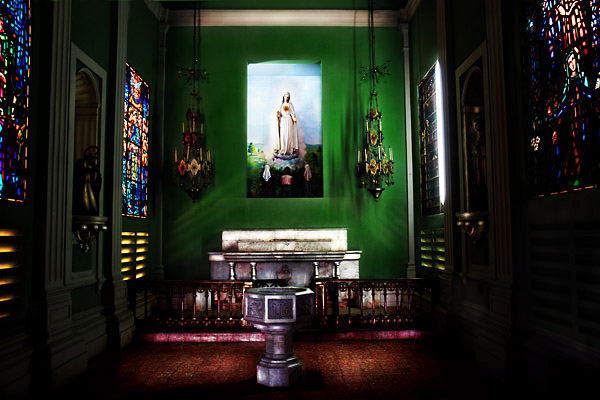
The interior of a Catholic church in Nicaragua

As of the early 1990s, the vast majority of Nicaraguans were nominally Catholic. Many had little contact with their church, however, and the country's Protestant minority was expanding rapidly. Christianity came to Nicaragua in the sixteenth century with the Spanish conquest and remained, until 1939, the established faith. The Catholic Church was accorded privileged legal status, and church authorities usually supported the political status quo. Not until the former President José Santos Zelaya came to power was the position of the church seriously challenged.

Nicaraguan constitutions have provided for a secular state and guaranteed freedom of religion since 1939, but the Catholic Church has retained a special status in Nicaraguan society. When Nicaraguans speak of "the church", they mean the Catholic Church. The bishops are expected to lend their authority to important state occasions, and their pronouncements on national issues are closely followed. They can also be called upon to mediate between contending parties at moments of political crisis.

A large part of the education system, in particular the private institutions that serve most upper- and middle-class students, is controlled by Catholic bodies. Most localities, from the capital of Managua to small rural communities, honor patron saints, selected from the Catholic calendar, with annual fiestas. Against this background, it is not surprising that the Sandinist government provided free public transportation so that 500,000 Nicaraguans, a substantial part of the national population, could see Pope John Paul II when he visited Managua in 1983.

In the mid-1980s, there was approximately 1 priest for every 7,000 Catholics, a ratio lower than the Latin American average and considerably lower than the 1 priest per 4,550 Nicaraguan Catholics recorded in 1960.

Urbanites, women, and members of the upper and middle classes are the most likely to be practicing Catholics, that is those who attend mass, receive the sacraments, and perform special devotions with some degree of regularity. Nicaraguans of the lower classes tend to be deeply religious but people not especially observant. Many limit their practice of the sacraments to baptism and funeral rites. Yet they have a strong belief in divine power over human affairs, which is reflected in the use of phrases such as "God willing" or "if it is God's desire" in discussions of future events.

Religious beliefs and practices of the masses, although more or less independent of the institutional church, do not entail the syncretic merger of Catholic and pre-Columbian elements common in some other parts of Latin America. Popular religion revolves around the saints, who are perceived as intermediaries between human beings and God. Prayers are directed to a relevant saint asking for some benefit, such as curing an illness, in exchange for ritual payment, such as carrying a cross in an annual procession.

Pictures of saints, called cuadros, are commonly displayed in Nicaraguan homes. Set in a corner or on a table and surrounded with candles, flowers, or other decorations, a cuadro becomes the centerpiece of a small domestic shrine. In many communities, a rich lore has grown up around the celebrations of patron saints, such as Managua's Saint Dominic (Santo Domingo), honored in August with two colorful, often riotous, day-long processions through the city. The high point of Nicaragua's religious calendar for the masses is neither Christmas nor Easter, but La Purísima, a week of festivities in early December dedicated to the Immaculate Conception, during which elaborate altars to the Virgin Mary are constructed in homes and workplaces.

=== Protestants and other Christians ===
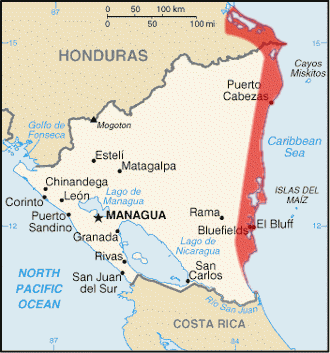
The former British colony of Mosquito Coast is marked in red.

Protestantism and other Christian denominations came to Nicaragua during the nineteenth century, but only during the twentieth century have Protestant denominations gained large followings in the Caribbean Coast of the country. By 1990 more than 100 non-Catholic faiths had adherents in Nicaragua, of which the largest were the Moravian Church, the Baptist Convention of Nicaragua, and the Assemblies of God.

Other denominations included the Church of God, the Church of the Nazarene, the Episcopal Church, the Church of Jesus Christ of Latter-day Saints (Mormons), Jehovah's Witnesses, and the Seventh-day Adventist Church. Most of these churches have been established through the efforts of missionaries from the United States and, although now institutionally independent and led by Nicaraguans, retain strong links with members of the same denomination in the United States.

The Moravian Church, established in the Caribbean Coast of Nicaragua in the late nineteenth century, is the dominant faith among the population of the region. Virtually all Miskito are Moravians, as are many Creoles, Sumu, and Rama. Moravian pastors play a prominent leadership role in Miskito communities. The Nicaraguan Baptists are related to the American Baptist Church, which began missionary work in 1917. The Nicaraguan Baptist Church's membership is concentrated in the Pacific region and is heavily middle class.

The Assemblies of God, dating from 1926, is the largest of the rapidly expanding Pentecostal denominations. Known for ecstatic forms of worship, energetic evangelization, and the strict personal morality demanded of members, the Pentecostal faiths flourished among the urban and rural poor. Helping recent arrivals from the countryside adjust to city life, they draw many migrants into their congregations. Pentecostalism reportedly has particular appeal to poor women because it elicits sobriety and more responsible family behavior from men. Largely because of the Pentecostals, the long-stagnant Protestant population has accelerated in numbers, going from 3 percent of the national population in 1965 to more than 20 percent in 1990.

=== Buddhism ===
Buddhism in Nicaragua has existed since the late 19th century, after immigration from countries with Buddhist populations, mainly China. Although sources are not readily available, Buddhists are believed to constitute 0.1% of the total population in Nicaragua. Buddhism was brought to Nicaragua in the late 19th century when the Chinese started arriving, many of which came from Guangdong province.

=== 1970s-1980s ===
The 1970s and 1980s were years of religious ferment in Nicaragua, often coupled with political conflict. Encouraged by the spirit of liberal renovation then sweeping through Latin American Catholicism, a new generation of Nicaraguan Catholic Church officials and lay activists tried to make the Catholic Church more democratic, more worldly in its concerns, and more sensitive to the plight of the poor majority. Many were inspired by the radical doctrines of Liberation Theology and the related idea of consciousness- raising base communities.

In the 1970s, priests, nuns, and lay workers committed to social change organized community development projects, education programs, and Catholic base communities. Especially after 1972, Catholic clergy and lay activists were increasingly drawn into the movement opposed to the regime of Anastasio Somoza Debayle. Many developed links with the Sandinista National Liberation Front (Frente Sandinista de Liberación Nacional—FSLN), which was very receptive to radicalized Catholics and led the insurrection that finally toppled the dictator.

No previous Latin American revolution has had such broad religious support as that of the Sandinistas. Even the Catholic bishops openly backed the anti-Somoza movement in its final phases. In the late 1970s and early 1980s, the Roman Christian Base Communities (Comunidades Eclesiásticas de Base—CEBs) provided the FSLN with vital political support among the urban poor. Catholics, including several priests, accepted positions in the new government and became members of the Sandinista party.

The close ties between Sandinistas and Catholics generated tensions within the Catholic Church and between the Catholic hierarchy and the FSLN. The bishops, led by Cardinal Miguel Obando y Bravo, accused Sandinistas and their Catholic supporters of attempting to divide the church by creating a separate Popular Church out of the CEBs. They viewed the Marxist-oriented FSLN as a long-term threat to religion in Nicaragua, despite the professed tolerance of the Sandinistas.

An explosive church-state conflict developed, during which the bishops more or less openly allied with the Sandinistas' political enemies and the FSLN struggled vainly to contain the influence of the institutional church. Throughout the 1980s, pro- and anti-Sandinista forces regularly manipulated religious symbols for political effect.

Protestant leaders were less inclined than the Catholic episcopate to become embroiled in conflicts with the Sandinistas. Some, including prominent Baptist ministers and a minority of pastors from other faiths, were sympathetic to the FSLN. At the other extreme, a few Moravian ministers openly identified with Miskito Contra forces operating from Honduras. Most Pentecostal leaders, reflecting the conservative attitudes of the United States denominations with which they were affiliated, were neutral toward the Sandinistas but generally adopted a public stance that was apolitical.

Suspecting that the States Central Intelligence Agency (CIA) and Christian conservatives in the United States were promoting evangelical activity in Nicaragua to undercut their government, Sandinista authorities monitored and tried to intimidate certain Pentecostals. The expansion of the Protestant population actually accelerated under Sandinista rule. During the first five years of Sandinista government, the number of evangelical churches (largely Pentecostal) had doubled to 3,000.

=== After the Sandinista revolution ===
The time the Sandinistas left power in 1990, church/state relations were considerably smoother than they had been in the early 1980s and mid-1980s, in part because the Contra war, which intensified conflict over religion, was winding down. Some of the radicalized Catholics who had supported the Sandinistas in the years since the 1970s remained loyal to them, but their influence outside the Sandinista movement and a few religious think tanks was limited. The number of active CEBs plunged in the early 1980s and never recovered, in part because the bishops had systematically restricted the church based activities of pro-Sandinista clergy. In the 2018 protests, Catholic and Protestant clergy mainly supported the anti-government protesters and played a significant role.

The Pentecostal churches continued their rapid growth among the poor. By the early 1990s, the Pentecostal minority was large enough to cause some observers, aware of the recent role of Christian conservatives in United States politics, to speculate about the influence of Pentecostals in future Nicaraguan elections.

=== 2020s ===
A market research firm carried out a survey in 2019 which showed that the percentage of evangelical Protestants was increasing, while the percentage of Catholics was decreasing. The survey found that Catholics made up 43% of the population, evangelical Protestants 41%, and unaffiliated religious believers 14%. The other 2% were made up of Jehovah’s Witnesses, The Church of Jesus Christ of Latter-day Saints, the Moravian Lutheran Church, Jews, Muslims, and nonbelievers.

== Religious freedom ==
The constitution provides for freedom of belief, religion, and worship; it declares that Nicaragua has no state religion, but it also empowers government controlled, community-level organizations called Family Committees to promote "Christian values" at a community level.

Religious groups may register with the government through a process similar to that which is used by NGOs; the Catholic Church does not need to register. Registration allows organizations to enter legal contracts and provides some tax exemptions.

The government requires that primary school education follows the government’s “Christian, Socialist, and Solidarity” principles. The government’s 2021-2026 human development policy recognizes religious activities as part of the country’s cultural traditions. The law establishes education in the country as secular but recognizes the right of private schools to be religiously oriented.

In 2022, Christian Solidarity Worldwide published findings showing that religious believers faced harassment and detention as part of a wider crackdown on civil liberties.

In 2023, the country was scored 2 out of 4 for religious freedom. In the same year, the country was ranked as the 50th most difficult place in the world to be a Christian.

=== Religious crackdowns under Ortega ===
The Catholic Church within Nicaragua has been the frequent subject of government crackdowns against priests following Catholic involvement in the Protests against Daniel Ortega. The country has also been involved in forcefully shutting down Catholic schools and media organizations along with thousands of non-governmental organizations since 2018. In 2023, the Holy See closed its embassy in Nicaragua due to Ortega's government formally suspending relations. On 15 September 2023, the Inter-American Commission on Human Rights urged Ortega's government to end the continuous persecution against the Catholic Church after concerns of the treatment of priests were raised. The United States Commission on International Religious Freedom released a report describing religious freedom in Nicaragua as "abysmal". The report expressed concern about prohibition of Easter processions, attacks on sanctuaries and crucifixes, cancellation of the legal status of most religious organizations, expulsion of nuns, harassment of Moravian Church leaders and the Mountain Gateway ministry, and deportations of church leaders.

== Statistics ==
Religion	1950		1963		1995		2005		2015
Religion	Number	%	Number	%	Number	%	Number	%	%
Christianity	887,183	99.9	1,254,553	99.8	3,264,671	89.5	3,751,269	82.6	89.7
Catholicism	851,065	95.8	1,206,253	96.0	2,658,887	72.9	2,652,985	58.5	54.5
Evangelicalism (Note: In the 1950 and 1963 the source used "Protestantes" and did not distinguish among the various denominations. In the later census it did distinguish and split out the Moravian Church and Jehovah's Witnesses and used the word "Evangélica" for the remaining Protestants. "Evangélica" in Spanish is much broader than Evangelical Protestant in American English.)	-	-	-	-	550,957	15.1	981,795	21.6	35.2
Moravian Church	-	-	-	-	54,827	1.5	73.902	1.6	
Protestantism	36,118	4.1	48,300	3.8	-	-	-	-	
Jehovah's Witnesses	-	-	-	-	-	-	42,587	0.9	
Other religion	930	0.1	2,142	0.2	73,391	2.0	74,621	1.6	1.5
No religion	-	-	-	-	309,246	8.5	711,310	15.7	8.8

== See also ==
- Religion in Latin America
- Buddhism in Nicaragua
- Islam in Nicaragua
- Catholic Church in Nicaragua
- Jewish Nicaraguan
