= Pedro Lisímaco de Jesús Vílchez Vílchez =

Nicaraguan Roman Catholic bishop

- Bishop of Jinotega
- Church: Catholic Church
- Diocese: Diocese of Jinotega
- In office: 18 June 1982 – 10 May 2005
- Predecessor: Prelature established
- Successor: Carlos Enrique Herrera Gutiérrez

Orders
- Ordination: 6 February 1955
- Consecration: 8 September 1984 by Andrea Cordero Lanza di Montezemolo

Personal details
- Born: 19 May 1929 Jinotega, Jinotega Department, Nicaragua
- Died: 19 February 2013 (aged 83)

Pedro Lisímaco de Jesús Vílchez Vílchez (19 May 1929 – 19 February 2013) was the first Roman Catholic Bishop and Bishop Emeritus of the Diocese of Jinotega.

== Biography ==
He was born in Jinotega on 19 May 1929 to Fidel Vilchez Zelaya and Pastora Vilchez. He was baptized in the San Juan de Jinotega parish by the priest Alberto Valencia of that same year.

Ordained to the priesthood in 1958, he was named bishop of the Diocese of Jinotega, Nicaragua, in 1984 and retired in 2005.
