= San Gioacchino ai Prati di Castello =

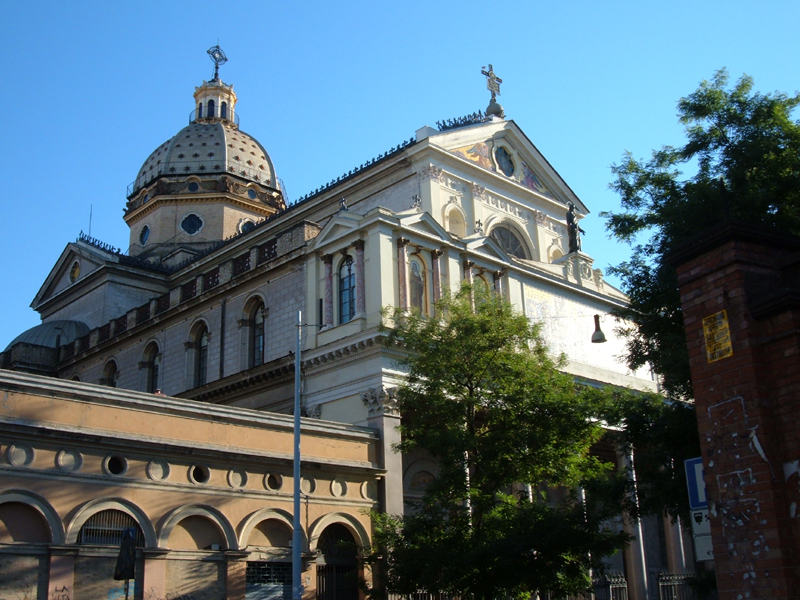
- Facade
- Click on the map for a fullscreen view
- 41°54′36″N 12°27′54″E
- Location: Via Pompeo Magno 25, Rome
- Country: Italy
- Denomination: Roman Catholic
- Tradition: Roman Rite
- Website: Official website

History
- Status: Titular church
- Dedication: Joachim
- Consecrated: 1911

Architecture
- Architect: Raffaele Ingami
- Architectural type: Church
- Style: Eclecticism
- Groundbreaking: 1891
- Completed: 1898

Administration
- District: Lazio
- Province: Rome

San Gioacchino ai Prati di Castello ("St Joachim's at the Fields of the Castle") is a church in Rome dedicated to Saint Joachim, the father of Mary, mother of Jesus. Construction began in 1891 and the building was opened to the public in 1898. It was consecrated on 6 June 1911 by Cardinal Pietro Respighi. Pope John XXIII made it a cardinal's titular church in 1960.

== List of Cardinal-Protectors ==
- Bernard Alfrink (1960–1987)
- Michele Giordano (1988–2010)
- Leopoldo Brenes (2014–present)
