= Leovigildo López Fitoria =

Nicaraguan Roman Catholic bishop

Leovigildo López Fitoria CM
- Bishop of Granada
- Church: Catholic Church
- Diocese: Diocese of Granada
- In office: 7 July 1972 – 15 December 2003
- Predecessor: Marco Antonio García y Suárez
- Successor: Bernhard Hombach

Orders
- Ordination: 11 July 1954
- Consecration: 7 October 1972 by Lorenzo Antonetti

Personal details
- Born: 7 June 1927 Boaco, Chontales Department, Nicaragua
- Died: 5 August 2016 (aged 89)

Leovigildo López Fitoria (27 June 1927 – 5 August 2016) was a Nicaraguan Catholic bishop.

Ordained in 1954, López Fitoria served as bishop of the Diocese of Granada, Nicaragua from 1972 to 2003.
