= Rubén López Sabariego =

Cuban busdriver

- Born: June 11, 1917; Felton village, Cojímar town, Guamá, Santiago de Cuba Province, Cuba
- Died: September 30, 1961 (aged 44); Guantanamo Bay Naval Base
- Other name: Ruben Lopez
- Occupation: Bus driver
- Known for: Killed under mysterious circumstances on the Guantanamo Bay Naval Base

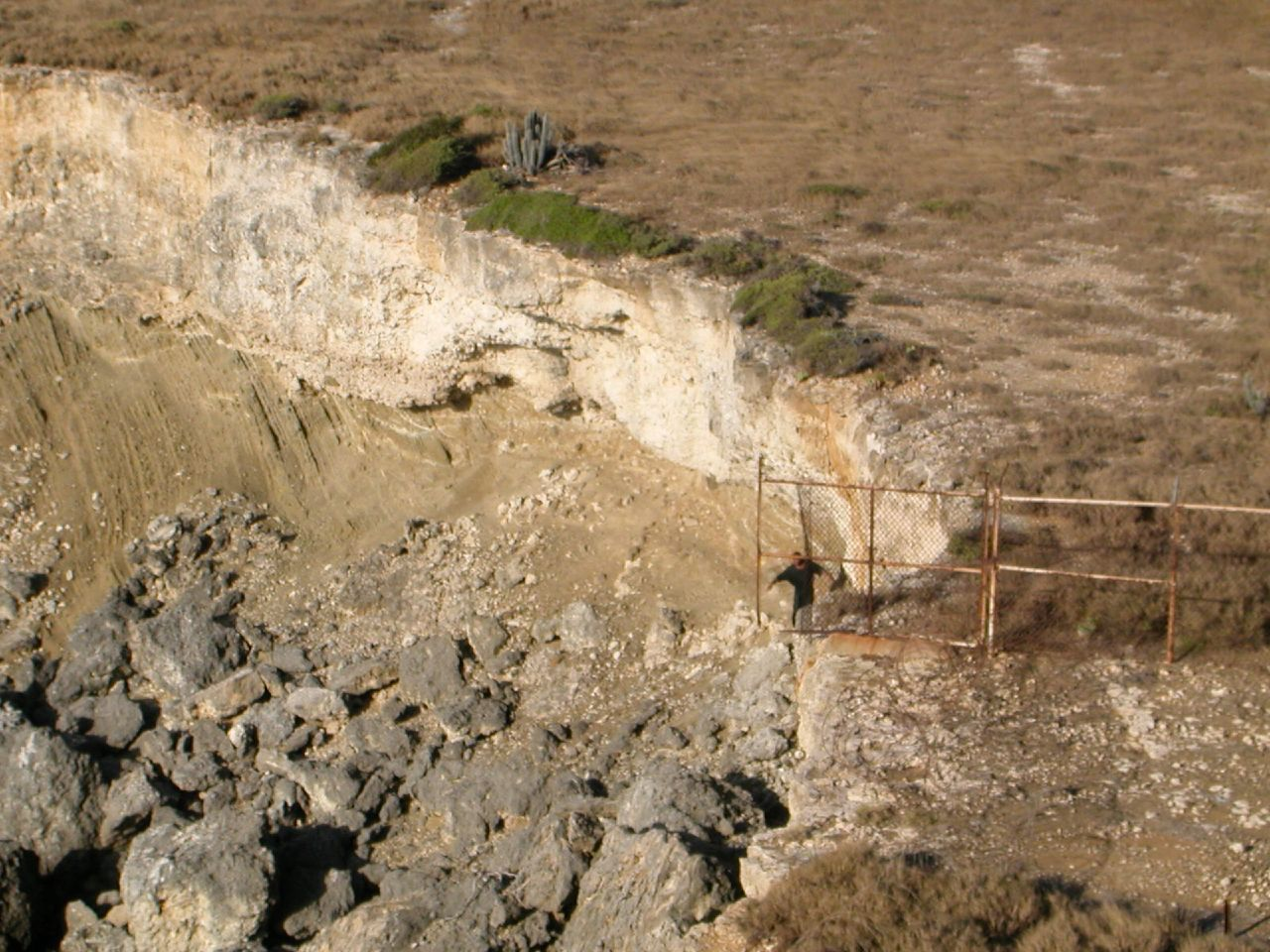
This 2004 picture shows the cliff just beyond the western boundary of the Guantanamo Bay Naval Base, where Captain Arthur J. Jackson initially tried to dispose of Rubén López's body.

Rubén López Sabariego (Note: In this Hispanic American name, the first or paternal surname is López and the second or maternal family name is Sabariego.) (June 11, 1917 – September 30, 1961) was a Cuban bus driver working on the Guantanamo Bay Naval Base, whose mysterious disappearance and death there became a cause célèbre in Cuba.

U.S. Naval Intelligence suspected López was a Cuban agent, but had nevertheless continued to let him keep his job on the base.

His body had been left to rot for over three weeks before it was returned to Cuba. When his body was returned, Cuban pathologists noting how extensively his bones had been broken, concluded he had been tortured.

== Family life ==
López was orphaned at an early age, and was raised by his grandparents. López started his first stretch of working at the Guantanamo base in 1939, working there as a carpenter until 1945. He married Georgina González in 1940 and raised nine children. He started working at Guantanamo again in 1949, working there until his death.

== Employment at Guantanamo ==
López had worked on the United States's Guantanamo Base since 1948. The USA employed thousands of Cuban workers, prior to the Cuban Revolution. Although it was the height of the Cold War, Cubans who the USA employed prior to the revolution were allowed to commute to the base and were allowed to continue to work there. As late as 2009, there were still three "commuters" working at Guantanamo, as well as several Cuban exiles living on the base.

== Disappearance ==
López's wife Georgina González last saw him alive when he left for work on September 30, 1961. When he failed to come home, she asked other commuters who worked on the base, who told her they thought the Americans had arrested him. On October 4, 1961, González had received permission from Cuban authorities to visit the US base to inquire after her husband. American officers noted that a shot had been heard, and suggested to her that López had been shot by Cuban authorities.

On her final visit to the base, the base chaplain showed her López's heavily decayed body lying in a ditch. It took an additional week for base officials to agree to release his body.

== William Szili's account ==
In 1963 U.S. Lieutenant William Szili offered his account of the shooting. He was the executive officer of a Company of Marines guarding the western boundary of the base. According to Szili, he and his company commander, Captain Arthur J. Jackson, who was awarded a Medal of Honor during World War II, had consumed approximately six martini cocktails at the base officers' club on September 30, 1961. He said he left Jackson at the officers' club, went home to sleep, and was woken by a call from one of the base's provost officers, that Jackson had found López in a "restricted area", and that Jackson needed his help.

The camp police had told Jackson to escort López to the Northeast Gate, the only gate officially in use after the Cuban revolution. But this wasn't possible, because doing so required taking a ferry ride to the eastern side of the bay, and the ferry only ran until midnight. Jackson decided to use a smaller gate that had been abandoned after the Cuban revolution.

When Jackson, Szili and López arrived at the abandoned gate the lock was rusted shut, and Jackson directed Szili to go get a sledge hammer. When Szili returned he found Jackson in a state of panic. Jackson told him he had been able to open the gate after all; he had escorted López to the Cuban side of the boundary; López had attacked him, and he had shot him. Jackson told Szili he had thrown López's body over the cliff where the boundary between the base and Cuban territory met the seashore.

The two officers left López's body lying on the beach below the cliff all day October 1, 1961. The evening of October 1 they decided they would return to the beach on the Cuban side, and bury López's body under rocks. But, after trying to cover the body with rocks on October 2, Jackson decided they should instead bring the body to the American side, and find a place to bury the body.

The next day the first attempt to retrieve López's body failed, when the rope they were using broke. They were eventually able to retrieve the body, with the help of three other officers and six enlisted men. Under Jackson's direction they tried to bury the body well inside the base, 800 feet (240 m) from the boundary fence. After rumors circulated, a search was made for the shallow grave, which was found over two weeks later.

Szili had trouble finding work after leaving the service, felt that his reputation had been unfairly blackened, and tried to get his Congressional Representative to help him get a court martial to clear his name.

== Cuban reaction ==
González, López's widow, was profiled in Cuban publications for years after the event. The Virgin Islands Daily News cited the killing in 1966, as an example of the kind of incident that led to Cuba refusing to sign a treaty in 1966.

Fidel Castro offered an account of López's death, based on the conclusions of the Cuban pathologists at López's autopsy, that López's body showed the effects of weeks of beating and torture.

In October 2011, Radioangulo listed injuries to his body that had led Cuban pathologists to conclude López had been tortured. It reported that:

Due to the persistence of [his wife], his remains were returned to her on October 21st with cranial, right cheek and left rib fractures, bayonet injuries to his abdomen, injuries to his leg and other lesions evident that he was submitted to severe tortures, according to the Cuban forensics.
