= Archdiocese of Managua =

Roman Catholic archdiocese in Nicaragua

Coordinates: 12.1327°N 86.2660°W

Archdiocese of Managua Archidioecesis Managuensis Arquidiócesis de Managua
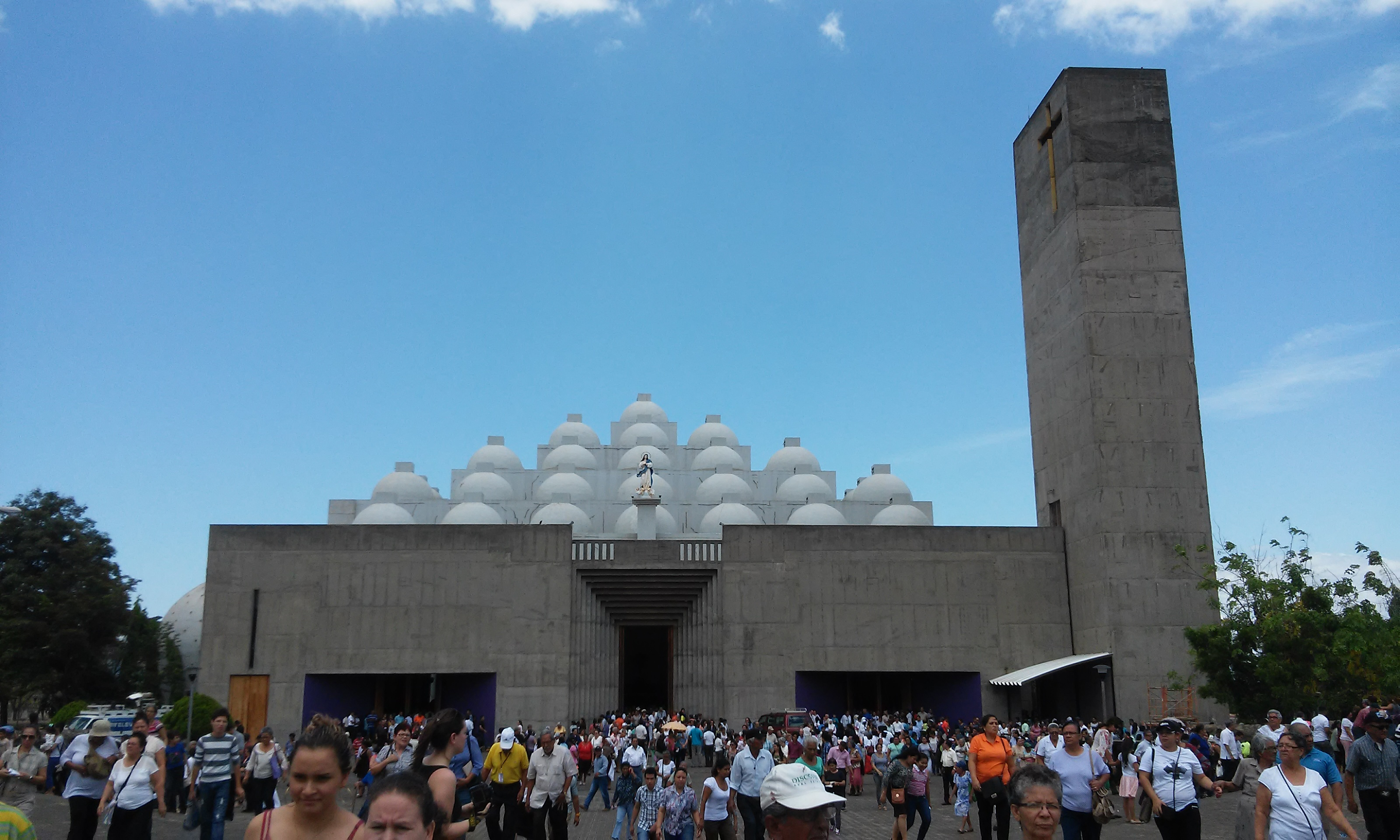
- The Metropolitan Cathedral of the Immaculate Conception

- Coat of arms

Location
- Country: Nicaragua
- Ecclesiastical province: Province of Managua

Statistics
- Area: 5,157 km^{2} (1,991 sq mi)
- Population: Total; Catholics: (as of 2021); 2,733,000; 2,331,000 (85.3%)
- Parishes: 118

Information
- Denomination: Roman Catholic
- Rite: Roman Rite
- Established: 2 December 1913 (112 years ago)
- Cathedral: Metropolitan Cathedral of the Immaculate Conception

Current leadership
- Pope: Leo XIV
- Archbishop: Leopoldo Brenes
- Auxiliary Bishops: Silvio José Báez, OCD

Map
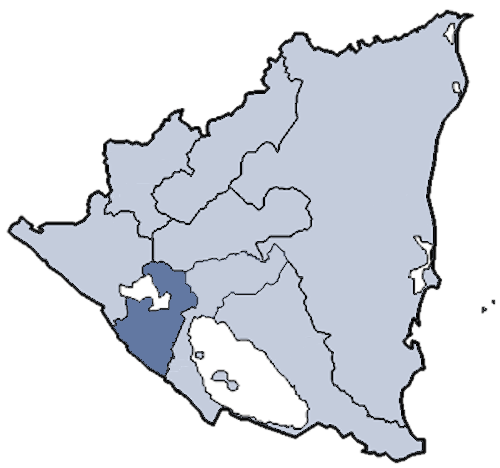

Website
- Official Site

The Roman Catholic Archdiocese of Managua (erected 2 December 1913) is a metropolitan diocese, and its suffragan dioceses include Bluefields, Esteli, Granada, Jinotega, Juigalpa, León en Nicaragua and Matagalpa.

== Leadership ==
Ordinaries

- Archbishop José Antonio Lezcano y Ortega (1913–1952)
- Archbishop Vicente Alejandro González y Robleto (1952–1968)
- Cardinal Miguel Obando Bravo, SDB (1970–2005)
- Cardinal Leopoldo Brenes Solorzano (2005–present)

Coadjutor archbishop

- Vicente Alejandro González y Robleto (1938–1952)

Auxiliary bishops

- Isidro Carrillo y Salazar (1913–1924), appointed Bishop of Matagalpa
- Carlos de la Trinidad Borge y Castrillo (1953–1968)
- Donaldo Chávez Núñez (1966–1970)
- César Bosco Vivas Robelo (1981–1991), appointed Bishop of León en Nicaragua
- Leopoldo Brenes Solorzano (1988–1991), appointed Bishop of Matagalpa (but would later return here as Archbishop); future Cardinal
- Juan Abelardo Mata Guevara, SDB (1988–1990), appointed Bishop of Esteli
- Jorge Solórzano Pérez (2000–2005), appointed Bishop of Matagalpa
- Silvio José Báez Ortega, OCD (2009-

== Territorial losses ==
Year	Along with	To form
1924		Diocese of Matagalpa

== Persecution ==
The Archdiocese of Managua has undergone continuing "repression and persecution" from 2018 through 2025, including government-ordered dissolution of religious orders, a stochastic terrorism attack on priests, and vandalism of churches.

== See also ==
- Catholic Church in Nicaragua
