= Schmelzbach =

River in Germany

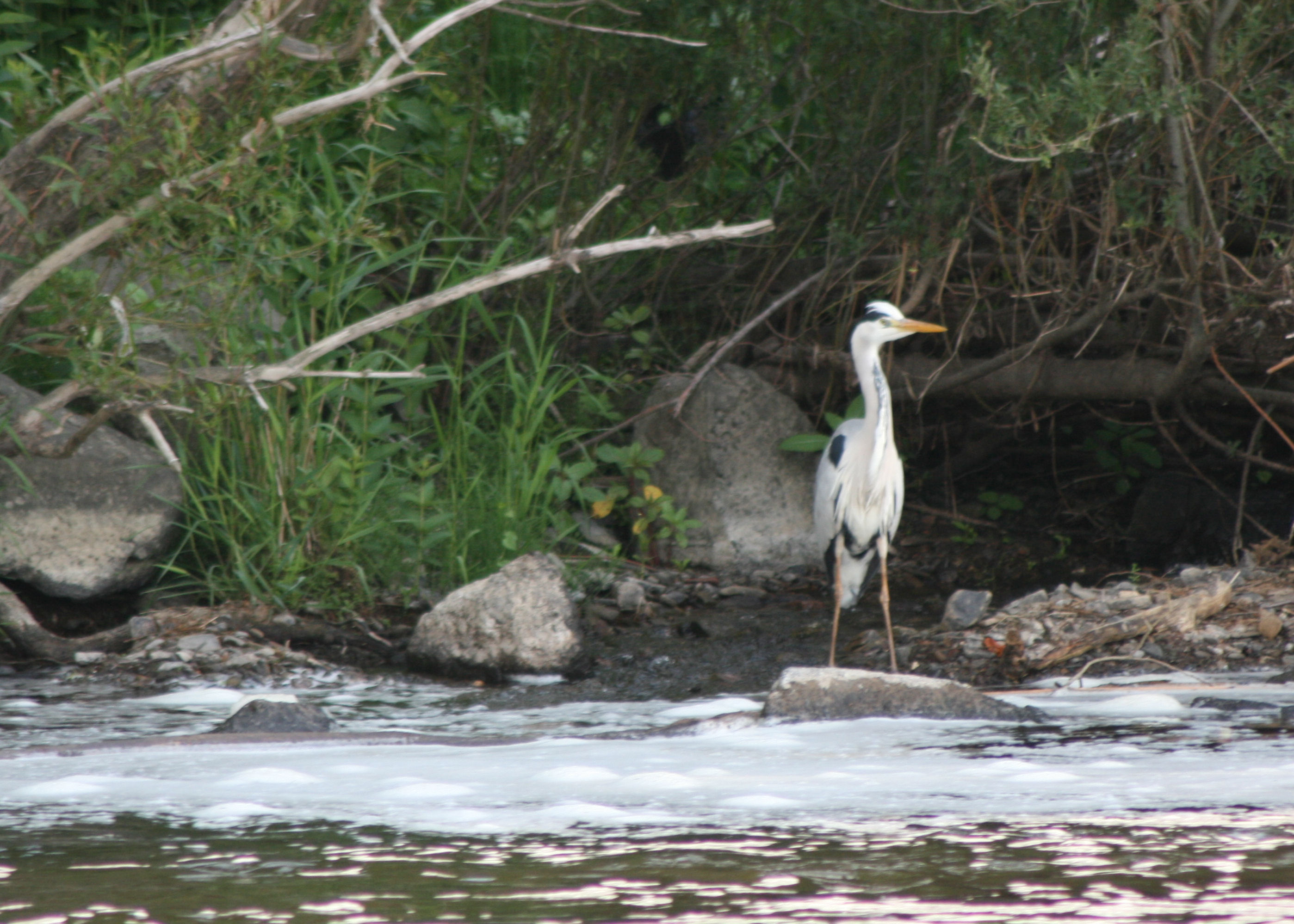

Location
- Country: Germany
- States: North Rhine-Westphalia

Physical characteristics
- Mouth
  - location: Sieg
  - coordinates: 50.7802°N 7.4337°E
- Length: 4.5 km

Basin features
- Progression: Sieg→ Rhine→ North Sea

Schmelzbach (German pronunciation: [ˈʃmɛltsbax]; also: Dörfer Bach, Hombach) is a small river of North Rhine-Westphalia, Germany. It flows into the Sieg in Eitorf-Schmelze.

== See also ==
- List of rivers of North Rhine-Westphalia
