= Michele Giordano =

Italian Roman Catholic prelate

His Eminence Michele Giordano
- Cardinal, Archbishop emeritus of Naples
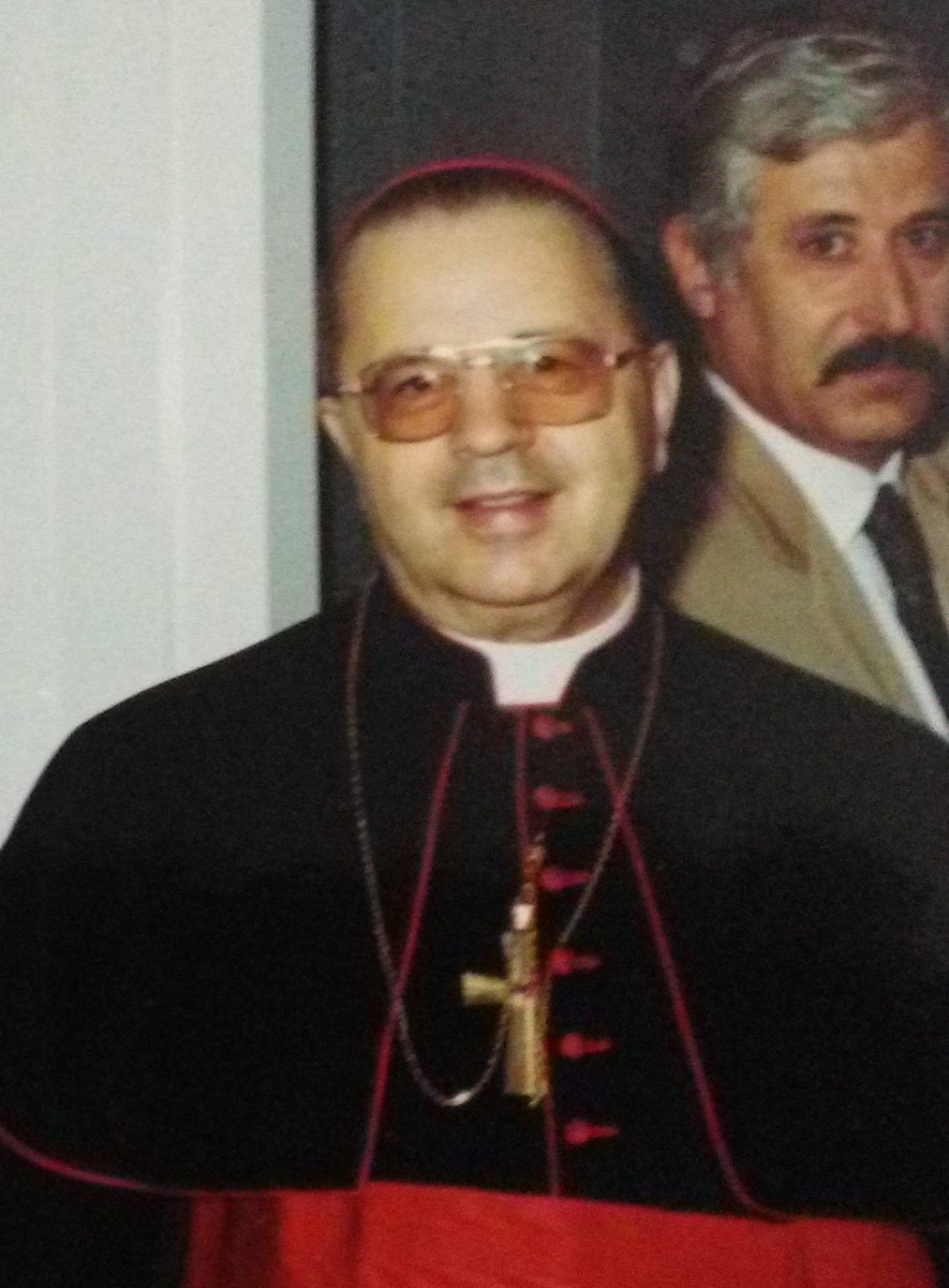
- Archdiocese: Naples
- Installed: 9 May 1987
- Term ended: 20 May 2006
- Predecessor: Corrado Ursi
- Successor: Crescenzio Sepe
- Other post: Cardinal-Priest of San Gioacchino ai Prati di Castello
- Previous posts: Archbishop of Matera (1974‍–‍1987); Auxiliary bishop of Matera (1971‍–‍1974)

Orders
- Ordination: 5 July 1953
- Consecration: 5 February 1972 by Giacomo Palombella
- Created cardinal: 28 June 1988 by John Paul II
- Rank: Cardinal-Priest

Personal details
- Born: 26 September 1930 Sant'Arcangelo, Italy
- Died: 2 December 2010 (aged 80) Naples, Italy
- Denomination: Catholic
- Coat of arms

Michele Giordano (26 September 1930 – 2 December 2010) was an Italian Roman Catholic prelate, who was the Archbishop of Naples and a cardinal-priest.

== Biography ==
Giordano was born at Sant'Arcangelo, in Basilicata. He was educated at the Minor Seminary in Potenza and later at the Pontifical Regional Seminary, Salerno and finally at the Pontifical Inter-regional Seminary, Posillipo. He was ordained to the priesthood on 5 July 1953. He served from 1953 to 1971, successively in the diocese of Anglona-Tursi as pastor; director of the center for social studies; diocesan assistant of the Catholic Action; professor of religion; vicar general. He was created Chaplain of His Holiness on 23 February 1968.

In 1971, Pope Paul VI named him as the titular bishop of Lari Castello and the Auxiliary Bishop of Matera, and, in 1974, as the Archbishop of Matera; it was eventually renamed as the Roman Catholic Archdiocese of Matera-Irsina. He obtained the title of Metropolitan Archbishop of the Roman Catholic Archdiocese of Naples in 1987. The following year, Pope John Paul II created him Cardinal-Priest of San Gioacchino ai Prati di Castello.

In 2000, Giordano stood trial in Naples on charges of allegedly using Church funds to support his brother's loan shark operation. Although acquitted, this made him the most senior cleric in Italy ever to stand trial.

He retired in May 2006, and was succeeded by Cardinal Crescenzio Sepe.

Cardinal Giordano was admitted to the Monaldi Hospital in Naples with respiratory problems and died a week later on 2 December 2010, at age 80. In the papal telegram of condolence sent on 3 December 2010 to Cardinal Sepe, Pope Benedict XVI offered prayers for the repose of his soul and the Apostolic Blessing to all those in mourning, stating that he learned of the prelate's death "with great sadness."
