= Pablo Antonio Vega Mantilla =

Catholic bishop

- Church: Roman Catholic Church
- Diocese: Juigalpa
- Appointed: 30 April 1991
- In office: 30 April 1991 – 29 October 1993

Personal details
- Born: Pablo Antonio Vega Mantilla; 17 August 1919 Nagarote, León Department, Nicaragua
- Died: 14 November 2007 (aged 88)

Pablo Antonio Vega Mantilla (17 August 1919, Nagarote, León Department – 14 November 2007) was the Roman Catholic Bishop of Juigalpa, Nicaragua, from 30 April 1991 until 29 October 1993. He then served as the Bishop Emeritus of the Diocese of Juigalpa until his death on 14 November 2007.
