= César Bosco Vivas Robelo =

Nicaraguan bishop (1941–2020)

The Most Reverend César Bosco Vivas Robelo
- Bishop of León
- Church: Catholic Church
- Installed: 1991
- Term ended: 2019
- Predecessor: Julián Luis Barni Spotti O.F.M.
- Successor: Sócrates René Sandigo Jirón
- Previous post(s): Auxiliary Bishop of the Archdiocese of Managua; Titular Bishop of Mididi

Orders
- Ordination: 17 May 1970 by Pope Paul VI
- Consecration: 21 November 1981 by Miguel Obando y Bravo S.D.B.

Personal details
- Born: 14 November 1941; Masaya, Nicaragua
- Died: 23 June 2020 (aged 78); Managua, Nicaragua

César Bosco Vivas Robelo (14 November 1941 – 23 June 2020) was a Nicaraguan Roman Catholic bishop.

Robelo was born in Masaya, Nicaragua and was ordained to the priesthood in 1970. He served as auxiliary bishop of the Roman Catholic Archdiocese of Managua, Nicaragua from 1981 to 1991 and as bishop of the Roman Catholic Diocese of León in Nicaragua, from 1991 to 2019.

Robelo died in 2020 from COVID-19.
