= Miguel Obando y Bravo =

Nicaraguan prelate

His Eminence Miguel Obando y Bravo SDB
- Cardinal, Archbishop of Managua
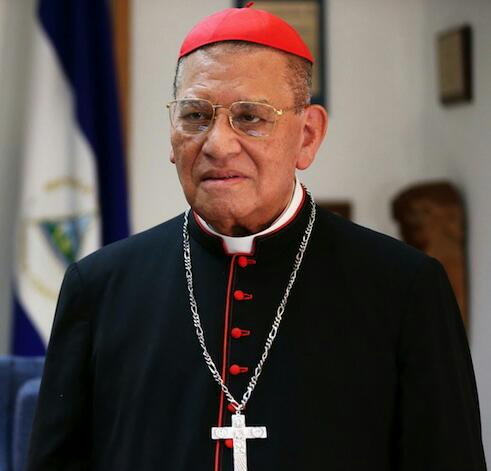
- Church: Roman Catholic Church
- Archdiocese: Managua
- See: Managua
- Appointed: 16 February 1970
- Installed: 4 April 1970
- Term ended: 1 April 2005
- Predecessor: Vicente Alejandro González y Robleto
- Successor: Leopoldo José Brenes Solórzano
- Other post: Cardinal-Priest of San Giovanni Evangelista a Spinaceto
- Previous posts: Auxiliary Bishop of Matagalpa (1968–70); Titular Bishop of Putia in Byzacena (1968–70)

Orders
- Ordination: 10 August 1958 by Giuseppe Paupini
- Consecration: 31 March 1968 by Marco Antonio García y Suárez
- Created cardinal: 25 May 1985 by Pope John Paul II
- Rank: Cardinal-Priest

Personal details
- Born: Miguel Obando y Bravo; 2 February 1926 La Libertad, Nicaragua
- Died: 3 June 2018 (aged 92) Managua, Nicaragua
- Denomination: Roman Catholic
- Motto: Omnibus omnia factus
- Coat of arms

Miguel Obando y Bravo, SDB (2 February 1926 – 3 June 2018) was a Nicaraguan Catholic prelate who served as Archbishop of Managua from 1970 to 2005. Pope John Paul II created him a cardinal in 1985. He was a member of the Salesians of Don Bosco.

== Life ==
Styles of Miguel Obando y Bravo
- Reference style: His Eminence
- Spoken style: Your Eminence
- Informal style: Cardinal
- See: Managua (emeritus)

Obando was born in La Libertad in the department of Chontales. He was appointed Titular Bishop of Puzia di Bizacena and appointed Auxiliary Bishop of Matagalpa on 18 January 1968. He was consecrated on 31 March 1968 by Marco Antonio García y Suárez, Bishop of Granada, assisted by Clemente Carranza y López, Bishop of Estelí, and Julián Luis Barni Spotti, O.F.M., Prelate of Juigalpa. His episcopal motto was Omnibus omnia factus. He was promoted to the metropolitan see of Managua on 16 February 1970 by Pope Paul VI. He was elected as president of the Episcopal Conference of Nicaragua, 1971–1974; and 1979–1983. He was also elected as president of the Episcopal Secretariat of Central America and Panamá serving from 1976 to 1980.

Obando was created Cardinal-Priest of San Giovanni Evangelista a Spinaceto on 25 May 1985, becoming the first Nicaraguan cardinal. He participated in the 2005 papal conclave which elected Pope Benedict XVI. Obando was president of the Episcopal Conference of Nicaragua from December 1999 to November 2005.

Pope John Paul accepted Obando's resignation as Archbishop of Managua on 1 April 2005. On 14 March 2007 Obando announced at a press conference held at Unica Catholic University that he had accepted a request made in January by Nicaraguan president Daniel Ortega to preside over the Peace and Reconciliation Commission, which is charged with ensuring the implementation of signed agreements with Nicaraguans who were affected by the civil war of the 1980s. He said it was not a partisan or government position. When asked if the Holy See approved, he said that Pope Benedict in a recent audience had told him to "work for the reconciliation of the Nicaraguan family".

Obando died in Managua on 3 June 2018 at the age of 92.

== Honors ==
In 1979 Obando received the Bruno Kreisky Award for peace and freedom, Vienna, Austria, the Plaque for Peace and Freedom of the Nicaraguan People, San Francisco, United States of America, 1980; the Letter of Brotherhood of the Piarist Society, Managua, 1980; the Venezuelan Order of Francisco Miranda, 1981; the Distinction of Loyalty to the Pope, the Church and the Nicaraguan People, Central of Nicaraguan Workers (CTN), 1982. In 1986 Universidad Francisco Marroquín honored Obando with an honorary doctoral degree.

== Views ==
=== Somoza regime ===
Obando became a vocal opponent of the corruption of the Anastasio Somoza regime in the late 1970s by expressing criticism in his pastoral letters as well as through the columns he wrote for the Boletín de la Arquidiócesis de Managua. He was critical of the corruption of the regime as it manifested itself through the government's mismanagement of relief funds after the 1972 Managua earthquake, and became an outspoken critic of the human rights abuses carried out by the National Guard. He helped to delegitimize the regime by refusing to accept the Mercedes automobile Somoza gave him and rejecting invitations to attend official state ceremonies.

=== Sandinistas in opposition ===
Obando served as an intermediary between the Sandinista National Liberation Front (FSLN) and the Somoza government on two occasions during Sandinista staged hostage-taking incidents. In a pastoral letter written in June 1979 he spoke in favor of the Sandinistas' use of armed force to overthrow the Somoza regime and encouraged Nicaraguans not to fear socialism. As a result of his criticism of the Somoza regime, government officials sometimes referred to him in private as "Comandante Miguel", as if he were a Sandinista leader.

=== Sandinistas in power ===
Obando's relationship with the Sandinistas altered dramatically by the early 1980s; he ultimately became one of the most vocal domestic opponents of the revolutionary government. He opposed the "people's church" (radical clergy who supported liberation theology) and banned the Misa Campesina Nicaragüense (Nicaraguan peasants' mass). He insisted that clergy adhere to canon law and refuse to undertake the exercise of civil power.

Obando opposed what he called the "godless communism" of the Sandinistas. He criticized many of their policies, including military conscription and restrictions of press freedoms, and accused the Sandinistas of human rights violations. The Sandinistas, in turn, complained that he should have attacked United States aid to the Contras. Initially, Obando had promised to the public that if human rights abuses on the part of the Contras were verifiably reported, he would denounce them. When many such abuses were reported by organizations (including Human Rights Watch and several human rights groups established by clergy of the Catholic Church itself), however, he did not denounce them as he had pledged. Instead, he travelled to the United States in January 1986 and declared his support for the Contras, thereby encouraging the U.S. Congress to provide them with military aid. This set the stage for a sharp confrontation between Obando and the Sandinista government. The Sandinistas, who already in July 1984 had expelled ten foreign priests (who had expressed solidarity with another religious figure who had been accused of being a contrarevolutionary), responded by rebuking Obando repeatedly in public forums. Despite the popular support the Sandinistas enjoyed at the time, this episode certainly damaged that support, as Obando was (as reported by journalist Stephen Kinzer) enduringly popular among Christian Nicaraguans.

=== Volte-face and Support for Daniel Ortega ===
In 2004 Obando suddenly and unexpectedly announced reconciliation with Daniel Ortega in a deal which offered support for the FSLN in return for Ortega's acquiescence to extending the ban on abortion to all cases, as the then government subsequently legislated, and for not pushing for corruption charges against Obando's protege Roberto Rivas (who was subsequently appointed head of the Supreme Electoral Council).

Obando continued to support Ortega in the 2006 and 2011 presidential elections, despite increasing claims by opposition figures that Ortega had manipulated the electoral system (with the help of Rivas). Obando also presided over the 2005 marriage of Ortega and Rosario Murillo

== See also ==
- The Catholic Church and the Nicaraguan Revolution
