= Leopoldo Brenes =

Nicaraguan Catholic cardinal

His Eminence Leopoldo José Brenes Solórzano
- Cardinal, Archbishop of Managua
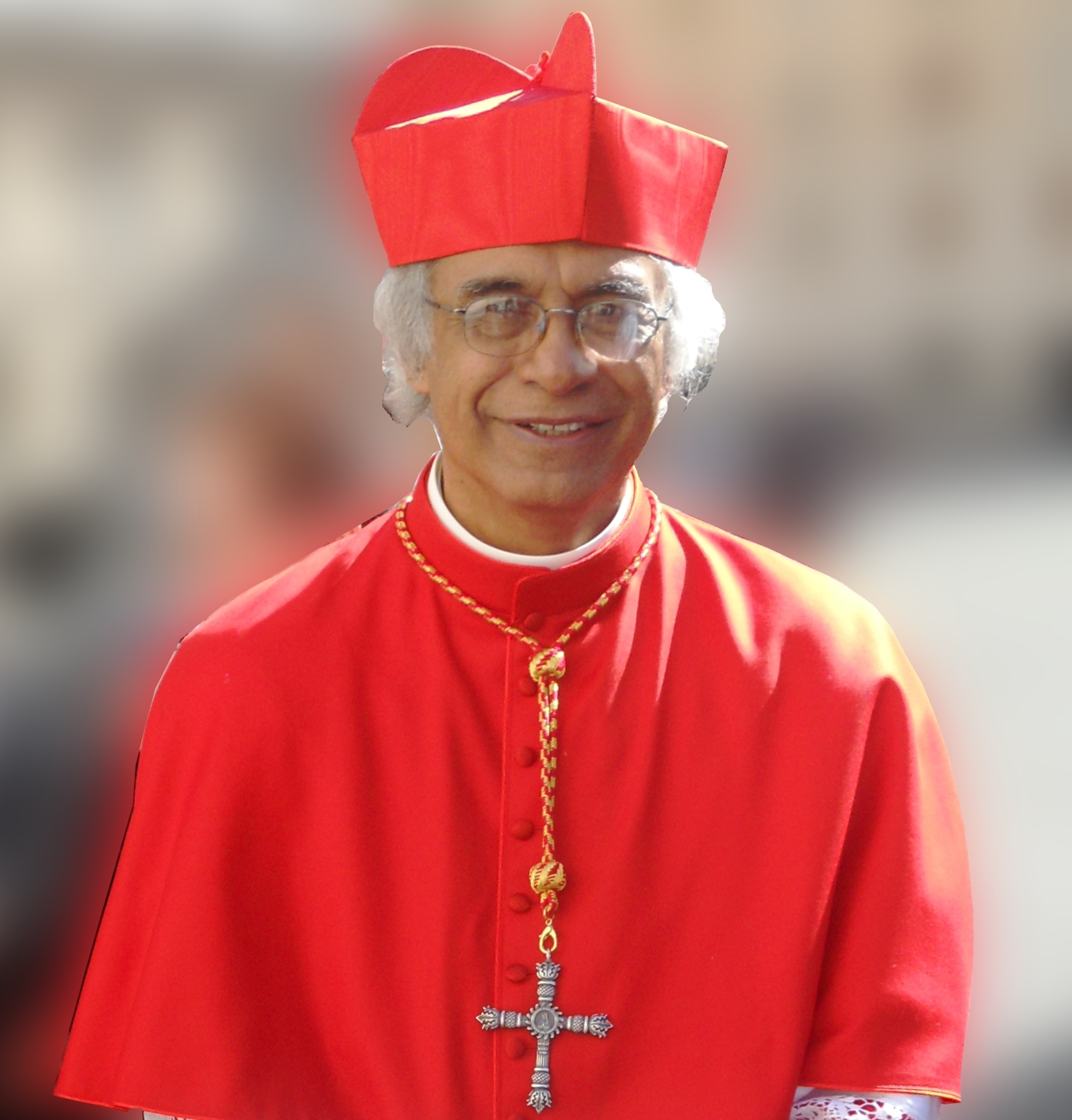
- Brenes in 2014
- Church: Catholic Church
- Archdiocese: Managua
- See: Managua
- Appointed: 1 April 2005
- Predecessor: Miguel Obando y Bravo
- Other posts: Cardinal-Priest of San Gioacchino ai Prati di Castello; President of Episcopal Conference of Nicaragua
- Previous posts: Titular Bishop of Maturba (1988–1991); Auxiliary Bishop of Managua (1988–1991); Bishop of Matagalpa (1991–2005)

Orders
- Ordination: 16 August 1974 by Miguel Obando y Bravo
- Consecration: 19 March 1988 by Miguel Obando y Bravo
- Created cardinal: 22 February 2014 by Pope Francis
- Rank: Cardinal-Priest

Personal details
- Born: 7 March 1949 (age 77) Ticuantepe, Nicaragua
- Denomination: Roman Catholic
- Motto: Tu me has enviado (You have sent me)
- Coat of arms: Leopoldo José Brenes Solórzano's coat of arms

Ordination history of Leopoldo Brenes
History
Episcopal consecration
- Principal consecrator: Miguel Obando Bravo
- Co-consecrators: Paolo Giglio; Arturo Rivera Damas
Cardinalate
- Elevated by: Pope Francis
Episcopal succession
Bishops consecrated by Leopoldo Brenes as principal consecrator
- Carlos Enrique Herrera Gutiérrez, OFM: 24 June 2005
- Silvio José Báez Ortega, OCD: 30 May 2009
- Rolando José Álvares Lagos: 2 April 2011

Styles of Leopoldo Jose Brenes Solorzano
- Reference style: His Eminence
- Spoken style: Your Eminence
- Religious style: Cardinal
- Informal style: Cardinal

Leopoldo José Brenes Solórzano (Spanish pronunciation: [le.oˈpol.do xoˈse ˈβɾenes soˈloɾsano]; born 7 March 1949) is a Nicaraguan prelate of the Catholic Church who has been Archbishop of Managua since 2005. He was made a cardinal in 2014. He was an auxiliary bishop in Managua from 1988 to 1991 and Bishop of Matagalpa from 1991 to 2005.

== Biography ==
Leopoldo Brenes was born in Ticuantepe on 7 March 1949 into a poor family, one of four children born to Lilliam Solórzano Aguirre and Leo Leopoldo Brenes Flores. He studied at the Rural School of Ticuantepe, the Cristóbal Rugada School of Masaya, and the Escuela Normal of Managua and then continued his secondary studies at the National Institute of Masaya and at Colegio San José de Calasanz. He then studied philosophy at the National Seminary Nuestra Señora de Fátima of Managua and theology in Mexico at the Superior Institute of Ecclesiastical Studies (ISEE). He earned a bachelor's degree in theology at the Pontifical Gregorian University and a licentiate in dogmatic theology at the Pontifical Lateran University. He was ordained a deacon on 13 January 1974.

== Priesthood ==
He was ordained a priest in Managua on 16 August 1974 by Miguel Obando Bravo. He then served in a number of roles, including priest in the parishes of Tisma, Las Brisas, la Asunción, and St. Pius X in Managua, and vicar for pastoral care and substitute vicar general of the Archdiocese of Managua. He was later a parish priest of Sagrada Familia, María Inmaculada, San Pío X, Espíritu Santo and Santa Rosa and San Agustín in Managua, and vicar for pastoral care of the Archdiocese of Managua and episcopal vicar for vocations and ministries.

== Bishop and archbishop ==
Pope John Paul II named him titular bishop of Maturba and appointed him auxiliary bishop of Managua on 13 February 1988. He was consecrated a bishop on 19 March 1988 in the cathedral of Managua by Cardinal Miguel Obando Bravo, Archbishop of Managua, assisted by Paolo Giglio, apostolic nuncio to Nicaragua, and Arturo Rivera Damas, Archbishop of San Salvador. His episcopal motto is Tu me has enviado. He was made Bishop of Matagalpa on 2 November 1991 and appointed Archbishop of Managua on 1 April 2005, the day before John Paul II's death. He took possession of the see on 21 May. He received the pallium from Pope Benedict XVI on 29 June 2005.

In the Episcopal Conference of Nicaragua he has been president of the Commission for Vocations and Ministries; secretary general of the Episcopal Conference; president of Cáritas Nacional; president of the Commission for Catechesis; and president of the Commission for Social Communications. He has served as a delegate for the Eucharistic Congresses, delegate to the Special Assembly for Latin America of the Synod of Bishops, delegate to the Latin American Episcopal Council (CELAM), president of the CELAM Commission Family-Life-Youth, and president of the Episcopal Secretariat of Central America (SEDAC). He has been vice-president of the Episcopal Conference of Nicaragua and its president, became president in 2006. He ended a term as president in 2021, when he was elected to a three-year term as vice-president.

Pope Benedict named him to a five-year term as a member of the Pontifical Commission for Latin America on 8 October 2009.

== Cardinal ==
On 22 February 2014, Pope Francis made him a cardinal, assigning him the titular church of San Gioacchino ai Prati di Castello. He was the second Nicaraguan and the third Central American to become a cardinal. On 15 January 2014 Pope Francis confirmed his membership in the Pontifical Commission for Latin America and on 22 May 2014 made him a member of the Pontifical Council for Justice and Peace.

He participated as a cardinal elector in the 2025 papal conclave that elected Pope Leo XIV.

== See also ==
- Cardinals created by Francis

Catholic Church titles
Preceded by Carlos Jose Santi Brugia, OFM	Bishop of Matagalpa; 2 November 1991 – 1 April 2005	Succeeded by Jorge Solorzano Perez
Preceded by Miguel Obando Bravo	Archbishop of Managua; 1 April 2005–present	Incumbent
Preceded by Rene Socrates Sandigo	President of Episcopal Conference of Nicaragua; 2014–present	Incumbent
Preceded by Michele Giordano	Cardinal Priest of San Gioacchino ai Prati di Castello; 22 February 2014–present	Incumbent
