= Catholic Church in Nicaragua =

The Catholic Church in Nicaragua is the Nicaraguan part of the worldwide Catholic Church, under the spiritual leadership of the Pope, curia in Rome, and the Conference of Nicaraguan Bishops.

== Overview ==
According to the 2005 census, Catholics made up 58.5% of the population. A market research survey in 2019 showed that the percentage of Catholics was decreasing and was down to 45%.

The country is divided into nine dioceses including one archdiocese.

Evangelization of Nicaragua began shortly after the Spanish conquest. In 1532, the first bishop took jurisdiction in the country. Jesuits were the leaders in mission work in the colonial period, which last till the 1820s. After Nicaragua became a republic in 1838, evangelization intensified, reaching the Atlantic coastline.

In the second half of the 20th century, some Church leaders were supportive of Marxist-type revolutions, as elsewhere in South America, supporting liberation theology.

== History ==
=== Nicaraguan Revolution ===
The role of the Catholic Church in the Nicaraguan Revolution is best described as an internal struggle between leftist supporters of liberation theology and the Sandinistas and the conservative opponents who sided with John Paul II and the conservative episcopal conference and opposed the Marxists.

In the colonial period, the Church acted as a check on conquistadors who pursued their own feudal interests contrary to those of the Spanish Crown and those of the Church itself. The Church served the crown by attempting to curb liberals wanting economic independence.

When the revolutionary struggle began in the 1960s and 1970s with the Sandinistas, the Church did not support it. The Catholic Church was still loyal to the Somoza regime at the beginning of the revolution but acts of repression and human abuses became prevalent by Somoza and horrified the Church. Somoza engaged in violent tactics such as the authorization of bombings of major cities, some of which targeted the church in his attempts to hold on to power.

Somoza soon began losing popularity among the masses, and slowly, support for the Sandinistas became more prevalent. Somoza's constant use of the state for the purpose of his own interests turned the Church against him. Eventually, many in the Church supported the Sandinistas when they overthrew Somoza.

The reorganization of pastoral work led to the formation of Christian base communities (CEBs), which incorporated the laity's importance in the pastoral mission. Religious activity at the grassroots increased and brought new vitality to the church. Peasants were unable to organize under the repressive Somoza regime, but under the CEBs, these peasants were allowed to congregate and this is how the grassroots organizations were born.

== Persecution ==
In recent years the Catholic Church has experienced persecution at the hands of the Government, led by Daniel Ortega. As of November 2022, 11 Catholic priests remained in custody, most of which for political offences. Rolando Alvarez, Bishop of Matagalpa and a prominent critic of Ortega, was arrested in 2023, and then exiled in January 2024. Several Catholic media outlets were shuttered by the Government, and police harassment of Catholics and clergy was widespread, with Catholic charity Aid to the Church in Need (ACN) considering Nicaragua the country of most concern regarding persecution of the Church in all of Latin America in 2022.

The situation led Pope Francis to publicly express his concern over lack of religious freedom in Nicaragua.

The crackdown on the Church is a response to growing criticism of the regime and its human and civil rights abuses by the Church hierarchy and priests. The Churches opened their doors to welcome people fleeing regime forces after demonstrations, and to care for those wounded in confrontations with the authorities, which led the Government to accuse the Catholic Church of siding with the demonstrators, according to the testimony of one priest who spoke, under anonymity for fear of reprisals, to ACN. The priest in question claimed to have personally rescued 19 demonstrators with AK-47 bullet wounds, after the hospitals had been ordered not to help them. "During those days, the people on our church benches were not listening to the Gospel, they were living it", said the priest.

In 2023, the country was scored 2 out of 4 for religious freedom. In the same year, the country was ranked as the 50th most difficult place in the world to be a Christian.

In recent years, the Catholic Church in Nicaragua has faced increased scrutiny and actions from government authorities. In a notable event, the Nicaraguan police, known for their loyalty to President Daniel Ortega's administration, announced an investigation into several dioceses for potential money laundering. According to their reports, significant sums were discovered in various Church facilities, and there were allegations of illegal withdrawals from bank accounts that were legally frozen.

In March 2022, Nicaragua withdrew its approval of Archbishop Waldemar Stanislaw Sommertag, Apostolic Nuncio in Managua and ordered him to leave the country. Then, in March 2023, Nicaragua officially severed ties with the Holy See, and by August of that year, the Nicaraguan government banned the Jesuits and seized their assets.

According to Catholic charity Aid to the Church in Need, at least 46 priests were under arrest at some point in Nicaragua in 2023. Many of these priests ended up being exiled at the beginning of 2024.

The government has banned traditional Holy Week processions since 2023. Some churches that obtained special permission to hold them are now restricted to short walks toward their main altars. According to Nicaraguan lawyer in exile Martha Patricia Molina, there has been a crackdown aimed at preventing participants from performing the Judeas passion plays, which are "theatrical representations of the passion and death of Christ".

== See also ==
- Religion in Nicaragua

== Notes and references ==
- Bahman, Baktiari. "Revolution and the Church in Nicaragua and El Salvador." Journal of Church and State 28:1 (1986), 15–42]
- Chasteen, John Charles. Born in Blood and Fire: A concise History of Latin America. (New York: W. W. Norton & Company, 2001).
- Deighton, Jane. "Sweet Ramparts: Women in Revolutionary Nicaragua." War on want and the Nicaraguan Solidarity Campaign. Sussex, London: 1983. Part Five, pp. 139–157.
- Dodson, Michael. “The Politics of Religion in Revolutionary Nicaragua.” Annals of the American Academy of Political and Social Science 483 (1986): 36–49.
- Gismondi, Michael A. “Transformations in the Holy Religious Resistance and Hegemonic Struggles in the Nicaraguan Revolution”. Latin American Perspectives, 50.13.3 (1986) 13–36.
- Greil, Arthur L. and Kowalewski, David. “Church-State relations in Russia and Nicaragua: Early revolutionary years”. Journal for Scientific Study of Religion 26.1 (1987) 92–104.
- Kearney, Michael. “Religion, Ideology, and Revolution in Latin America”. Latin American Perspectives, 50.13.3 (1986) 3–12.
- Kirk, John M. Politics and the Catholic Church in Nicaragua. Gainesville: University Press of Florida, 1992.
- Klaiber, Jeffrey L. "Prophets and Populists: Liberation Theology, 1968–1988". The Americas, Vol. 46, No. 1. (Jul., 1989), pp. 1–15.
- Klabier, Jefferey. "The Church, Dictatorships, and Democracy in Latin America." Orbis Books. New York; 1998: Ch. 10
- Lewellen, Ted C. “Holy and Unholy Alliances: The Politics of Catholicism in Revolutionary Nicaragua.” Journal of Church and State 31.1 (1989) 15–33.
- Mulligan, Joseph E. The Nicaraguan Church and the Revolution. Kansas: Sheed & Ward, 1991.
- Williams, Philip J. “The Catholic Hierarchy in the Nicaraguan Revolution.” Journal of Latin American Studies 17.2 (1985) 341–369.

== See also ==
- List of Central American and Caribbean Saints
