= 2026 in Nicaragua =

- Decades: 2000s; 2010s; 2020s
- See also: Other events of 2026; Timeline of Nicaraguan history

The following lists events in the year 2026 in Nicaragua.

== Incumbents ==
- Co-presidents: Daniel Ortega and Rosario Murillo

== Events ==
=== February ===
- 8 February – The government suspends visa-free entry for Cuban nationals.

=== April ===
- 16 April – The United States imposes sanctions on Maurice Ortega and Daniel Edmundo Ortega, the children of copresidents Daniel Ortega and Rosario Murillo, for illegally using proceeds from the gold industry to support the regime in Managua.
- 18 April – The United States imposes visa sanctions on deputy interior minister Luis Roberto Cañas Novoa over alleged involvement in human rights violations.

=== June ===
- 8 June – The US imposes sanctions on more than 100 Nicaraguan officials and their relatives in response to the death in custody of activist Brooklyn Rivera.

=== July ===
- 20 July — Co-President Ortega announces plans to introduce legislation abolishing future elections to prevent the opposition from coming to power.
- 24 July – The United States imposes a 12.5% tariff on Nicaragua, citing the presence of alleged forced labor in the supply chain.

=== October ===
- 3 October – The Foreign Ministry announces an immediate withdrawal from the Central American Parliament, denouncing the 1987 treaty establishing the body, following an OAS resolution calling for the release of political prisoners and the restoration of civil liberties.

=== November ===
- 11 November — The Health Ministry reports 5,343 cases of chikungunya alphavirus in the country since 17 May.

== Holidays ==
- 1 January – New Year's Day
- 2 April – Maundy Thursday
- 3 April – Good Friday
- 1 May – Labour Day
- 19 July – Liberation Day
- 14 September – Battle of San Jacinto
- 15 September – Independence Day
- 8 December – Immaculate Conception
- 25 December – Christmas Day

== Deaths ==
- 30 May – Brooklyn Rivera, 73, Miskito activist and politician

== See also ==
- List of years in Nicaragua
