= 2027 in Nicaragua =

- Decades: 2000s; 2010s; 2020s
- See also: Other events of 2027; Timeline of Nicaraguan history

The following lists events in the year 2027 in Nicaragua.

== Events ==
- By November – 2027 Nicaraguan general election (cancelled)

== Holidays ==
- 1 January – New Year's Day
- 25 March – Maundy Thursday
- 26 March – Good Friday
- 1 May – Labour Day
- 19 July – Liberation Day
- 14 September – Battle of San Jacinto
- 15 September – Independence Day
- 8 December – Immaculate Conception
- 25 December – Christmas Day

== See also ==
- List of years in Nicaragua
