= 2021 in Nicaragua =

- Decades: 2000s; 2010s; 2020s
- See also: Other events of 2021; Timeline of Nicaraguan history

The following lists events in the year 2021 in Nicaragua.

== Incumbents ==
- President: Daniel Ortega
- Vice President: Rosario Murillo

== Events ==
- 18 January – The National Assembly approves life sentences for “hate crimes” including rape and murder.
- 5 February – Evangelical minister Miguel Ángel Casco went viral on social media when he praised the ″multiplication of penises″ under President Daniel Ortega. Speaking on live television he said, ″Yo creo firmemente que Nicaragua va a experimentar... los milagros de multiplicar los penes”. (English: ″I firmly believe that Nicaragua is going to experiment... the miracle of multiplication of penises.″) He may have confused the Spanish words panes and penes, which are translated as ″bread″ and ″penises″, respectively.
- 11 February – Musician and songwriter Carlos Mejía Godoy condemns a proposed law that would declare the songs of the National Guard, as Heritage of the Nation, considering it confiscatory of his work.
- 18 February – The government creates the National Ministry for Extraterrestrial Space Affairs, The Moon and Other Celestial Bodies. It will be under the control of the Nicaraguan army.
- 2 March – A boat with partially decomposed bodies of six migrants, one with a passport from Guinea, is found Cayo Las Palomas.
- 8 March – President Ortega denounces the European Union (EU) and the United States for a lack of women′s rights, noting that nine of sixteen members of his Cabinet are women. Just hours before Ortega praised Nicaragua′s freedom of the press, five women denounced the government for surrounding their houses with police to prevent them from going out to commemorate International Women's Day.
- 8 June – 2021 Nicaraguan general election: Opposition candidates Félix Maradiaga and Juan Sebastián Chamorro are arrested while they are investigated for foreign ties. Cristiana Chamorro Barrios and Arturo Cruz Jr. are also arrested.
- 7 November – 2021 Nicaraguan general election

== Culture ==
- 1 March – 15th Edition of the Pedro J. Chamorro Cardenal Award for Excellence in Investigative Journalism

== Births ==
- 6 January – Nieves ("Snow"), a white Bengal tiger, born at the zoo near Managua.

== Deaths ==
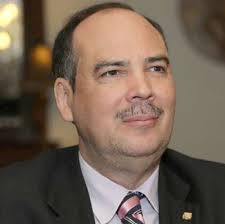
Mauricio Herdocia Sacasa

- 21 January – Mauricio Herdocia Sacasa, 62, jurist, General Secretary of Central American Integration System (2000).
- 12 February – Bayardo Cuadra, 84, chemical engineer and historian.
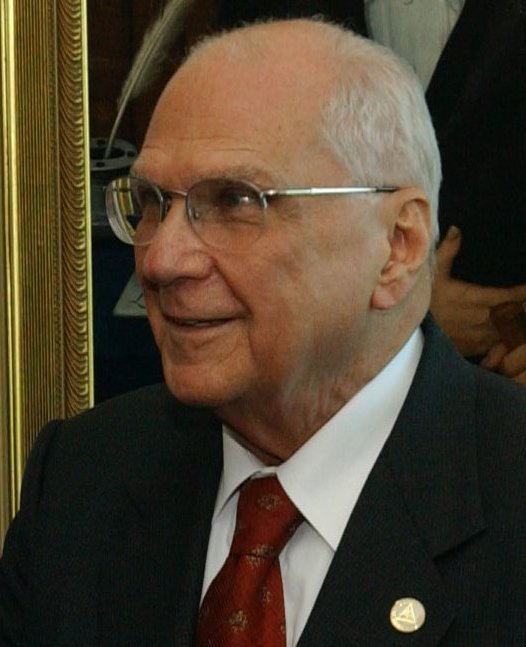
  Enrique Bolaños
- 14 June – Enrique Bolaños, 93, president of Nicaragua (2002–2007) and vice president (1997–2000).

== See also ==
- List of years in Nicaragua
- 2021 Atlantic hurricane season
- COVID-19 pandemic in North America
- Public holidays in Nicaragua
- 2021 in Central America
