= 2023 in Nicaragua =

- Decades: 2000s; 2010s; 2020s
- See also: Other events of 2023; Timeline of Nicaraguan history

The following lists events in the year 2023 in Nicaragua.

== Incumbents ==
- President: Daniel Ortega
- Vice President: Rosario Murillo

== Events ==
- 9 February – The government of Nicaragua releases 222 political prisoners and sends them to the United States.
- 18 October – Nicaragua releases 12 Catholic priests, critical of President Daniel Ortega's regime, and sends them to Rome, Italy, following an agreement with Vatican City.
- 18 November – Sheynnis Palacios, a Nicaraguan model and beauty pageant titleholder was crowned Miss Universe 2023.
- 19 November – Nicaragua completes its withdrawal from the Organization of American States.

== See also ==
- List of years in Nicaragua
- 2023 Atlantic hurricane season
- COVID-19 pandemic in North America
- Public holidays in Nicaragua
