= Michael J. Schroeder =

American historian and professor

- Born: March 1958 (age 68); Minnesota, U.S.
- Citizenship: American
- Occupations: Historian, professor
- Known for: Research on the Sandino Rebellion and Nicaraguan history

Academic background
- Education: University of Minnesota (BA); University of Michigan (PhD)

Academic work
- Discipline: Latin American history, History of Nicaragua
- Institutions: Lebanon Valley College; Eastern Michigan University; University of Michigan-Flint

Michael J. Schroeder is an American historian and professor emeritus of history at Lebanon Valley College in Annville, Pennsylvania.

He is well known for his research on the history of Nicaragua, especially the Sandino Rebellion in the 1920s and 1930s, and for his work as a co-editor of major world history reference books.

== Early life and education ==
Schroeder was born in March 1958 in Minnesota, where he was also raised. He worked his way through college as a roofer and carpenter from 1977 to 1987. He got his Bachelor of Arts degrees in both History and Economics from the University of Minnesota, graduating summa cum laude in 1987.

After that, he moved to Ann Arbor, Michigan, where he lived for 21 years. He earned his Ph.D. in History from the University of Michigan in 1993 with a dissertation on the Sandino Rebellion.

== Academic career ==
Schroeder started his teaching career at the University of Michigan-Flint, where he was an Assistant Professor of History from 1993 to 1999. He then taught at Eastern Michigan University as an Assistant Professor of History from 1999 to 2008. In 2008, he joined Lebanon Valley College in Pennsylvania, where he served as an associate professor and later became a professor emeritus.

Over his career, his teaching focused on the Atlantic World since 1500, especially Latin America and the United States since the Age of Revolution.

== Research and publications ==
Schroeder is a specialist in Nicaraguan history. He has written numerous articles and book chapters on topics like death squads, children and war, and aerial terrorism during the 1920s and 1930s. His 1996 article in the Journal of Latin American Studies, titled "Horse Thieves to Rebels to Dogs," received an honorable mention for the Conference on Latin American History (CLAH) Prize and focused on Nicaraguan political violence. His article "Cultural geographies of grievance and war: Nicaragua's Atlantic Coast region in the first Sandinista revolution, 1926–1934", published in Dialectical Anthropology in 2012, won the 2013 Harold Eugene Davis Prize from the Middle Atlantic Council of Latin American Studies. He also published "Bandits and Blanket Thieves, Communists and Terrorists: The Politics of Naming Sandinistas in Nicaragua, 1927–1936 and 1979–1990" in Third World Quarterly in 2005. His chapter "The Sandino Rebellion Revisited: Civil War, Imperialism, Popular Nationalism, and State Formation Muddied Up Together in the Segovias of Nicaragua, 1926–1934" appeared in Close Encounters of Empire: Writing the Cultural History of U.S.–Latin American Relations (Duke University Press, 1998). With David C. Brooks, he published "Caudillismo Masked and Modernized: The Remaking of the Nicaraguan State via the Guardia Nacional, 1925–1936" in the Middle Atlantic Review of Latin American Studies in 2018. His chapter on the Cuban Missile Crisis, "National Security and Transnational Insecurity", appeared in Mapping Latin America: Space and Society, 1492–2000 (University of Chicago Press, 2010). He also wrote Mexican Americans (Chelsea House, 2007), part of The New Immigrants series. His book Los malditos pájaros de hierro on the air war in Nicaragua during the Sandino rebellion was published in Managua in 2018. He created the Sandino Rebellion Digital Historical Archive, an open-access digital archive of nearly 5,000 primary documents on the rebellion.

He contributed the chapter "To Induce a Sense of Terror: Caudillo Politics and Political Violence in Northern Nicaragua, 1926-34 and 1981-95" to Death Squads in Global Perspective: Murder with Deniability (2000). Aside from his regional expertise, Schroeder is a co-editor of the World History: A Comprehensive Reference Set, a major encyclopedia project he worked on with other scholars including Jiu-Hwa Lo Upshur. He also co-authored textbooks like The Twentieth Century and Beyond: A Global History. He is a member of the Academia de Geografía e Historia de Nicaragua.

== Political and community activism ==
Schroeder is also active in local politics and community work. In 2020, he ran as a Democratic candidate in a special election for the Pennsylvania State Senate to represent District 48, but he lost to the Republican candidate, David Arnold. He has been involved with several environmental and community organizations. He was the founder and vice president of Lebanon Pipeline Awareness, president of the Quittapahilla Watershed Association, and president of the Friends of Old Annville. He also founded the Quittapahilla Creek Garbage Museum, which is a unique project focused on environmental awareness. He won the 2017 Governor's Award for Environmental Excellence.

== Personal life ==
Schroeder is married to his wife Karen and they have two children together. He has three grandchildren.
