= 2022 in Nicaragua =

- Decades: 2000s; 2010s; 2020s
- See also: Other events of 2022; Timeline of Nicaraguan history

The following lists events in the year 2022 in Nicaragua.

== Incumbents ==
- President: Daniel Ortega
- Vice President: Rosario Murillo

== Events ==
- 6 January – A 6.1 magnitude earthquake hits Nicaragua.
- 12 January – Israel and the Argentine foreign ministry separately issue condemnations against the presence of Iranian minister Mohsen Rezaee at the inauguration of Nicaraguan President Daniel Ortega. Rezai is wanted by Argentina for his alleged connections to the 1994 AMIA bombing.
- 6 June – 9th Summit of the Americas: The Biden administration bans the president of Nicaragua from attending this year's Summit of the Americas in Los Angeles, United States.
- 30 June – Hurricane watches are issued for Nicaragua and Costa Rica as Potential Tropical Cyclone Two is expected to form into Tropical Storm Bonnie in the coming hours.
- 2 July – Tropical Storm Bonnie makes landfall near the Costa Rica–Nicaragua border. The storm subsequently crosses over from the Atlantic basin to the Pacific basin, becoming the first storm to do so since Hurricane Otto in 2016. One person is reported missing in Trinidad and Tobago.
- 4 July – El Salvador suspends classes as Hurricane Bonnie passes through Central America. Deaths have been reported in Nicaragua and El Salvador.
- 28 July – Fifteen people are killed and 47 others are injured after a bus crash in Esteli, Nicaragua.
- 19 August – Police in Nicaragua confirm that they have arrested an anti-Ortega Roman Catholic bishop in Managua and warned against further "provocative and destabilizing" activities amongst the clergy.
- 9 October – Hurricane Julia makes landfall overnight in Laguna de Perlas.
- 6 November – 2022 Nicaraguan local elections
- 2 December: The United States Commission on International Religious Freedom adds Cuba, Nicaragua, and the Russian paramilitary organization Wagner Group to its blacklist of countries and organizations violating international religious freedom, signalling possible sanctions by the U.S. government.

== Deaths ==
- 29 January – David Green, baseball player (St. Louis Cardinals, San Francisco Giants) (born 1960)
- 11 February – Hugo Torres Jiménez, Sandinista guerrilla and military leader
- 5 March – Roberto Rivas Reyes, magistrate, president of the Supreme Electoral Council (2000–2018)
- 9 December – Pedro Miguel Arce, Nicaraguan-born Canadian actor.

== See also ==
- List of years in Nicaragua
- 2022 Atlantic hurricane season
- COVID-19 pandemic in North America
- Public holidays in Nicaragua
