= 2021 in Central America =

The following lists events that happened during 2021 in Central America.

== Incumbents ==
=== Belize ===
(Belize)

- Chief of state: King Charles III (since 2022)
- Represented by Governor-General Sir Colville Young (since 1993)
- Head of Government: Prime Minister Johnny Briceno (starting 2020)

=== Costa Rica ===
(Costa Rica)

- Chief of state and Head of Government: President Carlos Alvarado Quesada (since 2018)
  - First Vice President Epsy Campbell Barr (since 2018)
  - Second Vice President Marvin Rodríguez Cordero (since 2018)

=== El Salvador ===
(El Salvador)

- Chief of state and Head of Government: President Nayib Bukele Ortez (since 2019)
- Vice President Felix Augusto Antonio Ulloa Garay (since 2019)

=== Guatemala ===
(Guatemala)

- Chief of state and Head of government: President Alejandro Eduardo Giammattei Falla (since 2020)
- Vice-president César Guillermo Castillo Reyes (since 2020)

=== Honduras ===
(Honduras)

- Chief of state and Head of Government: President Juan Orlando Hernandez Alvarado (since 2014)
- Vice Presidents: Ricardo Alvarez, Olga Alvarado, Maria Rivera (since 2018)

=== Nicaragua ===
(Nicaragua)

- Chief of state and Head of government: President Daniel Ortega (since 2007)
- Vice President Rosario Murillo Zambrana (since 2017)

=== Panama ===
(Panama)

- Chief of state and Head of Government: President Laurentino "Nito" Cortizo Cohen (since 2019)
- Vice President Jose Gabriel Carrizo Jaen (since 2019)

== Monthly events ==
=== January and February ===
- January 8 – Guatemalan military spokesman Ruben Tellez says that up to 4,000 soldiers will be deployed to reinforce its borders and stop migrants. General Tito Livio Moreno, Honduras' senior military officer, said earlier this week that soldiers would be deployed there to preemptively stop any migrant caravans.
- January 9 – Prosecutors in the United States District Court for the Southern District of New York accuse former President Juan Orlando Hernández of taking bribes and protecting drug traffickers.
- January 11 – Authorities from Mexico, Guatemala, Honduras, and El Salvador meet in Corinto, Honduras to discuss coordination on migration.
- January 13 – Two hundred Honduran migrants march towards San Pedro Sula en route to Guatemala. Guatemalan President Alejandro Giammattei says he may declare a “state of prevention” along the border. Guatemala already requires a negative COVID-19 test and other travel documents.
- January 15 – Violence breaks out in El Florido, Copán Ruinas, along the Honduran-Guatemalan border as migrants try to enter Guatemala. 300 people who entered Guatemala illegally were intercepted 40 kilometres (25 mi) west of the border.
- January 21 – The Mexican National Guard stops a truck with 130 Central American migrants in Veracruz.
- January 23 – United States President Joe Biden pledges $4 billion for development in Honduras, El Salvador, and Guatemala.
- February 4 – U.S. Border Patrol officials in Texas release hundreds of Central American families in Laredo and Brownsville after authorities in Tamaulipas, Mexico refuse to take them in because of overcrowding in camps.
- February 6 – U.S. Secretary of State Antony Blinken says the agreements with Guatemala, El Salvador, and Honduras to send asylum-seekers back to those countries are suspended.
- February 19 – The Group of Seven (G-7) promises an equitable distribution of COVID-19 vaccines, although few details have been provided.
- February 23 – The World Food Programme urgently calls for US$47.3 million to help 2.6 million people in El Salvador, Guatemala, Honduras and Nicaragua hit by famines caused by the economic crises related to COVID-19 and natural disasters.
- February 26 – Honduras and Guatemala each receive 5,000 doses of Moderna COVID-19 vaccine, donated by Israel. The vaccines will be destined for health workers. Honduras has had 167,000 infections and 4,000 deaths, while Guatemala has reported 173,000 cases and 6,334 deaths.

=== March to June ===
- March 2 – A boat with partially decomposed bodies of six migrants, one with a passport from Guinea, is found Cayo Las Palomas, Nicaragua.
- March 8 – 5,000 women march in San Salvador and 1,000 in Guatemala City demanding decriminalization of abortion and an end to violence against women on International Women's Day.
- June 11 – Eleven countries, private organizations, and international banks pledge US$110 billion to help Central American countries deal with the root causes of emigration. This is in addition to the US$300 billion already pledged by the U.S. government.

== Programmed and scheduled events ==
=== Elections ===
- February 28 – 2021 Salvadoran legislative election
- March 3 – 2021 Belizean local elections
  - Corozal Bay, House of Representatives by-election
- March 14
  - 2021 Honduran general election, 2021 Honduran local elections
  - 2021 Nicaraguan general election

=== Holidays ===
==== January to March ====
- January 1 – New Year's Day
- January 19 – Martyrs' Day (Panama)
- February 14–15 – Carnival, Public holidays in Panama
- February 16 – Ash Wednesday, Panama
- March 8 – National Heroes & Benefactors Day, Belize.

==== April to June ====
- April 1 – Holy Thursday, Costa Rica
- April 2 – Good Friday
- April 3 – Holy Saturday
- April 5 – Easter Monday
- April 11 – Juan Santamaría Day, Costa Rica
- April 14 – Pan American Day, Honduras
- May 1 – Labour Day, International Workers' Day
- May 24 – Commonwealth Day, Belize
- June 30 – Army Day, Public holidays in Guatemala

==== July to September ====
- July 19 – Sandinista Revolution Day, Public holidays in Nicaragua
- July 26 – Guanacaste Day, Costa Rica
- August 2 – Virgin of Los Angeles Day, Costa Rica
- August 6 – Fiesta of San Salvador, celebrated in El Salvador
- September 10 – Saint George's Caye Day, Belize
- September 14 – San Jacinto Day, Nicaragua
- September 15/20 – Act of Independence of Central America, independence from Spain in 1821; celebrated in Costa Rica, El Salvador, Guatemala, Honduras Nicaragua
- September 21 – Independence Day, Belize

==== October to December ====
- October 7 – Francisco Morazán′s Birthday, Honduras
- October 8 (probable) – Armed Forces of Honduras Day
- October 11 – Pan America Day, Belize
- October 20 – Guatemalan Revolution Day
- November 1 – All Saints' Day, celebrated in Guatemala
- November 3 – Separation Day (from Colombia, 1903), Panama
- November 4 – Flag of Panama Day
- November 5 – Colón Day, Panama
- November 10 – Los Santos Uprising Day, Panama
- November 19 – Garifuna Settlement Day, Belize
- November 29 – Independence Day, Panama
- December 8 – Feast of the Immaculate Conception, Nicaragua Panama
- December 25 – Christmas Day
- December 27 – Boxing Day, Belize

== Sports ==
- March 18–30 – CONCACAF Men's Olympic Qualifying Championship rescheduled for in Guadalajara, Mexico.

== Deaths ==
- January 1 – Elmira Minita Gordon, politician, Governor-General of Belize (1981–1993).
- January 24 – Roberto Cañas López, 70, Salvadoran politician, guerrilla and academic, signant of Chapultepec Peace Accords.
- February 4 – Antonio Azúcar Hernández, 44, Salvadoran diplomat, consul in Tapachula, Chiapas, Mexico; COVID-19.
- March 2 – Telma Barria Pinzón, 60, Panamanian diplomat; drowned during landslide in Colombia.
- March 3 – Tomas Altamirano Duque, 93, Panamanian politician, Vice President of Panama (1994–1999).

== See also ==
- 2021 in the Caribbean
- COVID-19 pandemic in North America
- 2020s
- 2020s in political history
- Central American Parliament
- List of state leaders in Central America in 2021
- 2021 Atlantic hurricane season
