= 2019 in Nicaragua =

- Decades: 1990s; 2000s; 2010s; 2020s
- See also: Other events of 2019; Timeline of Nicaraguan history

The following lists events in the year 2019 in Nicaragua.

== Incumbents ==
- President: Daniel Ortega
- Vice President: Rosario Murillo

== Events ==
- 2018–2022 Nicaraguan protests

== Deaths ==
- 7 February – Miriam Argüello, politician (b. 1927).
- 23 April – José Rizo Castellón, politician, economist and lawyer, Vice President (b. 1944).
- 5 May – Magaly Quintana, historian and women's rights activist (b. 1952).

== See also ==
- List of years in Nicaragua
