= 2020 in Nicaragua =

- Decades: 2000s; 2010s; 2020s
- See also: Other events of 2020; Timeline of Nicaraguan history

The following lists events in the year 2020 in Nicaragua.

== Incumbents ==
- President: Daniel Ortega
- Vice President: Rosario Murillo

== Events ==
- 17 March – Vice President Rosario Murillo announced that Cuba was going to send doctors and pharmaceuticals to Nicaragua to help deal with COVID-19, despite there being no confirmed cases in the country at the time. Murillo also claimed that medical supplies were sent by Venezuela as well.
- 18 March – The first confirmed case of COVID-19 in the country is announced: a 40-year-old man who recently returned to Nicaragua from its neighboring country of Panama.
- 23 August – Bishop Silvio Báez, who has been outside of Nicaragua for reasons of security since April 23, 2019, accuses President Ortega of being a dictator. The Centro Nicaragüense de Derechos Humanos (Nicaraguan Human Rights Center, Cenidh) says that the Catholic Church has been the victim of 24 attacks since April 2018.
- 9 September – The Pittsburgh Pirates take #21 out of retirement for a game against the Chicago White Sox at PNC Park. 9 September is celebrated by Major League Baseball (MLB) as "Roberto Clemente Day". Clemente, a Puerto Rico native, died in a plane crash in December 1972 while en route to Nicaragua to deliver disaster relief to victims of an earthquake.
- 14 September – Battle of San Jacinto, national holiday Students and authorities receive the independence torch from their Honduran counterparts at the border post Las Manos, Nueva Segovia Department.
- 15 September – Independence Day (from Spain, 1821), national holiday President Ortega proposes life sentences for political dissidents who commit "hate crimes."
- 16 November – Hurricane Iota: Category 5 hurricane made landfall in Honduras and Nicaragua.
- 10 December – The Centro Nicaragüense de Derechos Humanos (Cenidh) accuses President Ortega of "passing the limits" on human rights violations, citing 325 deaths during protests since 2018.
- 16 December – The United States says it will continue to exert pressure on Nicaragua to ensure that the 2021 Nicaraguan general election is free and fair.
- 21 December – The Congress passes a law banning terrorists, coup-mongers, and “traitors to the homeland” from running in the 2021 elections.

== Scheduled events ==
- December 8 – Feast of the Immaculate Conception, national holiday
- December 25 – Christmas Day, national holiday

== Deaths ==
- January 5 – David Albin Zywiec Sidor, American-Nicaraguan Roman Catholic prelate, Bishop of Siuna (b. 1947)
- February 20 – José Benito López Méndez, leader of an opposition political party.
- March 1 – Ernesto Cardenal, poet and priest (b. 1925).
- May 19 – Carlos Jirón, politician and member of the National Assembly (b. 1955).
- May 25 – Otto de la Rocha, singer, songwriter and actor (b. 1933).
- June 16 – Edén Pastora ("Commander Zero"), politician and revolutionary leader (b. 1936).
- June 23 – César Bosco Vivas Robelo, Roman Catholic prelate and former Bishop of León (b. 1941).

== See also ==
- 2020 in Central America
- COVID-19 pandemic in Nicaragua
- List of years in Nicaragua
