= 2025 in Nicaragua =

- Decades: 2000s; 2010s; 2020s
- See also: Other events of 2025; Timeline of Nicaraguan history

The following lists events in the year 2025 in Nicaragua.

== Incumbents ==
- President: Daniel Ortega and Rosario Murillo (since 30 January)
- Vice President: Rosario Murillo (until 30 January)

== Events ==
- 30 January – The National Assembly officially amends the Constitution of Nicaragua to extend the presidential term to six years from five and declares President Daniel Ortega and his wife, Vice President Rosario Murillo, co-presidents, among other measures.
- 4 May – Nicaragua announces its withdrawal from UNESCO, citing its decision to award the UNESCO/Guillermo Cano World Press Freedom Prize to the newspaper La Prensa for its reporting amid a government crackdown.
- 19 June – Exiled opposition figure Roberto Samcam is shot dead at his residence in San Jose, Costa Rica.
- 15 August – Carlos Cardenas, a lawyer and longtime critic of the government, is arrested during police raids targeting opponents. He is reported dead in state custody 15 days later.
- 23–31 August – 2025 FIBA AmeriCup
- 25 August – The United States announces the death of opposition activist Mauricio Alonso, who is believed to have been arrested in July.
- 2 October – Ukraine severs diplomatic relations with Nicaragua in response to the latter's recognition of the Russian annexation of Donetsk, Kherson, Luhansk and Zaporizhzhia oblasts and Crimea.

== Holidays ==
- 1 January – New Year's Day
- 17 April – Maundy Thursday
- 18 April – Good Friday
- 1 May – Labour Day
- 19 July – Liberation Day
- 14 September – Battle of San Jacinto
- 15 September – Independence Day
- 8 December – Immaculate Conception
- 25 December – Christmas Day

== Deaths ==
- 14 June – Violeta Chamorro, 95, president (1990–1997).
- 5 November – Norma Helena Gadea, 69, singer.

== See also ==
- List of years in Nicaragua
