= La Jornada (disambiguation) =

La Jornada may refer to:

- La Jornada, a Mexican newspaper
- La Jornada (Managua), a Nicaraguan newspaper
- Statue of Juan de Oñate (Albuquerque, New Mexico), named La Jornada
