= 2017 in Nicaragua =

- Decades: 1990s; 2000s; 2010s; 2020s
- See also: Other events of 2017; Timeline of Nicaraguan history

The following lists events in the year 2017 in Nicaragua.

== Incumbents ==
- President: Daniel Ortega
- Vice President:
  - Moises Omar Halleslevens Acevedo (until 10 January)
  - Rosario Murillo (from 10 January)

== Events ==
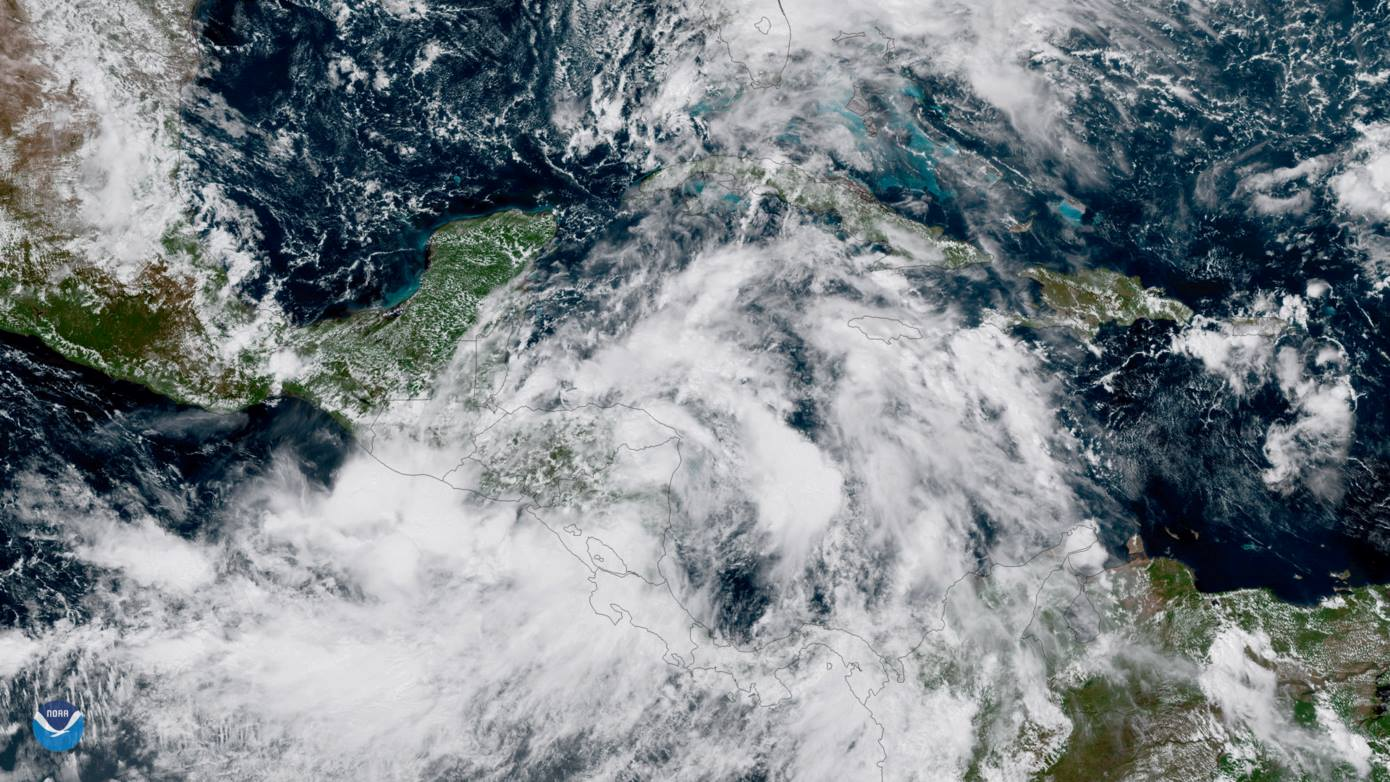
Tropical Storm Nate over Nicaragua on 5 October.

- Ongoing since 2013 – The Nicaraguan protests
- 10 January – Rosario Murillo takes over as vice president, succeeding Moises Omar Halleslevens Acevedo.
- 25 March – Miss Nicaragua 2017
- October – Hurricane Nate causes substantial damage.
- 30 November – The Roman Catholic Diocese of Siuna is established

== Deaths ==
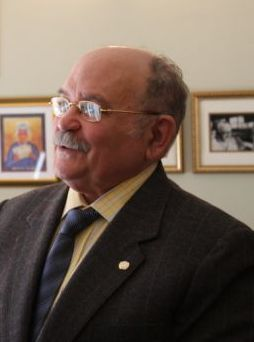
Miguel d'Escoto Brockmann

- 8 June – Miguel d'Escoto Brockmann, diplomat, politician and priest, Foreign Minister of Nicaragua and President of the United Nations General Assembly (b. 1933).

== See also ==
- List of years in Nicaragua
