= 1927 in Nicaragua =

- Decades: 1910s; 1920s; 1930s; 1940s
- See also: Other events of 1927 · Timeline of Nicaraguan history

Events from the year 1927 in Nicaragua.

== Incumbents ==
- President: Adolfo Díaz

== Events ==
- May 20 - Pact of Espino Negro
- July 15 - Battle of Ocotal
- July 25 - Battle of San Fernando
- July 27 - Battle of Santa Clara
- September 4 - 1927 Nicaraguan parliamentary election
- September 16 - Battle of Telpaneca
- October 9 - Battle of Sapotillal
