= 2018 in Nicaragua =

- Decades: 1990s; 2000s; 2010s; 2020s
- See also: Other events of 2018; Timeline of Nicaraguan history

The following lists events in the year 2018 in Nicaragua.

== Incumbents ==
- President: Daniel Ortega
- Vice President: Rosario Murillo

== Events ==
=== April ===
- 18 April - Unrest erupts in Nicaragua by mostly students after social security reforms.
- 20 April - The death toll for protests that began two days ago reaches 10 by government figures.
- 21 April - A local journalist, Miguel Angel Gahona, was shot dead in the city of Bluefields, allegedly by a police sniper.
- 23 April - As the death toll reaches 24, President Ortega cancels his reforms.
- 27 April - The Nicaraguan Center for Human Rights puts the death toll during the recent protests to 38.

=== May ===
- May 24 - On May 24, 2018, Marco Novoa was one of several people that were kidnapped and tortured for eight days in the city of Managua, Nicaragua. Novoa, a 26 year old American citizen born in Macon, Georgia was studying at the American University (Nicaragua) located in Managua. During this time, Novoa was known to be an "Active Participant" in the 2018–2020 Nicaraguan protests against President Daniel Ortega. Marco stated that he was kidnapped and beaten by Pro-Ortega Paramilitary groups. Reports state that these groups have burned down homes, businesses and University buildings. Doctors and Churches were targeted for providing medicine and refuge to protesters. Protesters were treated as criminals and terrorists. According to Novoa when he was kidnapped, Some of the methods of torture included: waterboarding, Mock execution, electric shocking with tasers and they sodomized him with a metal pole. Novoa stated they were asking him, "Where was the money coming from?". Novoa was known to gather money from the local community and churches supporting the protesters. On May 31, 2018, the Paramilitary men dropped off Novoa on the side of a dirt road. " More than 300 people have been killed since protests began in mid-April and thousands more have been wounded." Marco thinks that due to him being U.S Citizen and coming from an upper-middle class is what saved him. U.N. High Commissioner for Human Rights stated that "they had found a wide range of human rights violations, “including extrajudicial killings, torture, arbitrary detentions, and denying people the right to freedom of expression.” Novoa wanted to know what the United States Government is doing about this issue. On Thursday June 5, 2018, "The Trump administration announced it will yank visas from several Nicaraguan officials it blames for the country’s response to a wave of anti-government demonstrations in which state security forces have killed dozens of people. This was the first punitive action taken by the administration as international condemnation of the government of President Daniel Ortega has grown." The United States and Nicaragua have history together. "The United States is the dominant economic partner for Nicaragua, buying 51 percent of Nicaraguan exports, supplying 32 percent of its imports, providing 20 percent of investment, sending 54 percent of its remittances, and being the origin of 19 percent of its tourists, according to 2017 figures." Marco continues to advocate for his people and share his story hoping it will lead to change.

=== July ===
- July 8–38 people are killed during anti-government protests in Diriamba, Jinotepe, and Matagalpa Department.

== Deaths ==
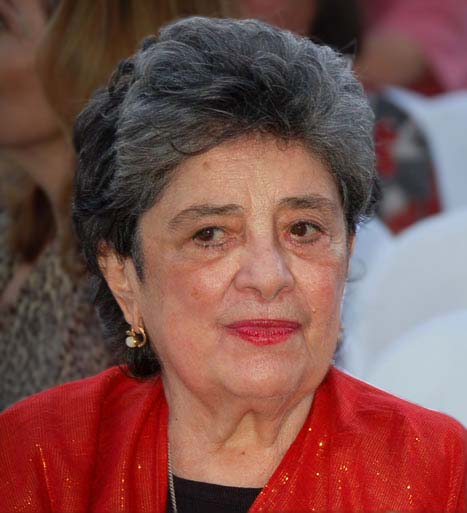
Claribel Alegría

- 13 January – Julio Rocha López, football administrator (b. 1950).
- 25 January – Claribel Alegría, poet, essayist, novelist, and journalist (b. 1924)
- 3 June – Miguel Obando Bravo, cardinal catholic (b. 1926)

== See also ==
- List of years in Nicaragua
