= 2014 in Nicaragua =

- Decades: 1990s; 2000s; 2010s; 2020s
- See also: Other events of 2014; Timeline of Nicaraguan history

The following lists events that happened during 2014 in Nicaragua.

== Incumbents ==
- President: Daniel Ortega
- Vice President: Moises Omar Halleslevens Acevedo

== Events ==
=== August ===
- August 30 - Twenty gold miners are rescued from a collapsed mine. Five still remain missing however.

=== October ===
- October 18 - 22 people are killed in heavy rainfall, with 9 killed in the capital of Managua by a wall collapse.

== See also ==
- List of years in Nicaragua
