= 2024 in Nicaragua =

- Decades: 2000s; 2010s; 2020s
- See also: Other events of 2024; Timeline of Nicaraguan history

The following lists events in the year 2024 in Nicaragua.

== Incumbents ==
- President: Daniel Ortega
- Vice President: Rosario Murillo

== Events ==
=== January ===
- 13 January – The government releases and expels 19 Catholic priests, including bishops Rolando José Álvarez Lagos of Matagalpa and Isidoro del Carmen Mora Ortega of Siuna, to the Vatican.

=== February ===
- 7 February: Nicaragua grants political asylum to former Panamanian president Ricardo Martinelli after he requested protection at the Nicaraguan embassy in Panama City.
- 16 February: The government orders the dissolution of the Asociación de Scouts de Nicaragua and seven other nongovernmental organizations perceived of opposition to the regime of President Daniel Ortega, accusing the scouting movement of failing to report financial statements and operating under an “expired” board of directors.

=== April ===
- 6 April – Nicaragua suspends diplomatic relations with Ecuador following the raid on the Mexican embassy in Quito.
- 30 April – The International Court of Justice rejects a request by Nicaragua asking the court to order Germany to suspend aid to Israel.

=== May ===
- 8 May – The National Assembly cancels a 2014 concession agreement with a Hong Kong-based firm to build an inter-oceanic canal across the country.

=== August ===
- 8 August – Nicaragua orders the expulsion of the Brazilian ambassador amid a diplomatic row over criticism by President Lula da Silva of the authoritarian regime of President Daniel Ortega. The Nicaraguan ambassador in Brasília is also expelled in retaliation.
- 19 August – The government orders the banning of 1,500 non-governmental organisations including the Nicaraguan Red Cross.
- 22 August – The government orders the closure of 151 non-governmental organisations including the American and European Chambers of Commerce.

=== September ===
- 5 September – The government sends 135 political prisoners to Guatemala for future relocation to the United States following negotiations with Washington.

=== October ===
- 11 October – The government breaks diplomatic relations with Israel, citing the latter's war in Gaza.

=== November ===
- 14 November – The government expels Carlos Enrique Herrera Gutiérrez, the Bishop of Jinotega and concurrent president of the Episcopal Conference of Nicaragua, to Guatemala.

== Holidays ==
- 1 January – New Year's Day
- 28 March – Maundy Thursday
- 29 March – Good Friday
- 1 May – Labour Day
- 19 July – Liberation Day
- 14 September – Battle of San Jacinto
- 15 September – Independence Day
- 8 December – Immaculate Conception
- 25 December – Christmas Day

== Deaths ==
- 30 September – Humberto Ortega (b. 1947), minister of defense and Commander-in-Chief of the Army (1979-1995).

== See also ==
- List of years in Nicaragua
