= Timeline of Managua =

The following is a timeline of the history of the city of Managua, Nicaragua.

== Prior to 20th century ==
- 1846 – Villa de Managua attains city status.
- 1852 – Managua becomes capital of Nicaragua.
- 1874 – Huellas de Acahualinca (fossils) discovered.
- 1875 – Managua Department (administrative division) established.
- 1876 – Flood.
- 1885 – Earthquake.
- 1899 – Parque Central (Managua) (park) established.

== 20th century ==
=== 1900s–1960s ===
- 1901 – José Dolores Estrada Morales becomes mayor.
- 1913 – Roman Catholic Archdiocese of Managua established.
- 1915 – Xolotlan Airport built.
- 1926 – La Prensa newspaper begins publication.
- 1931 – March 31: 1931 Nicaragua earthquake.
- 1934
  - February 21: Assassination of Augusto César Sandino.
  - Cinema Gonzalez opens.
- 1938 – Cathedral of Managua built.
- 1948 – National Stadium built.
- 1950 – Population: 109,352.
- 1951 – Alianza Francesa de Managua founded.
- 1952 – Banco de América Central founded.
- 1960 – Jesuit Central American University founded.
- 1961 – Teatro Experimental de Managua active.
- 1968
  - Earthquake.
  - Las Mercedes Airport expanded.
- 1969 – Rubén Darío National Theatre opens.

=== 1970s–1990s ===
- 1970 – Banco de América building built.
- 1971 – Population: 398,514.
- 1972 – December 23: 1972 Nicaragua earthquake.
- 1974
  - December: Sandinistas raid residence of government official in Los Robles.
  - Metrocentro Managua shopping centre in business.
- 1975 – Centro Comercial Plaza España (shopping mall) built in Bolonia.
- 1978 – January 10: Assassination of Pedro Joaquín Chamorro Cardenal; protest ensues.
- 1979
  - July 19–20: Sandinistas in power.
  - Masaya Volcano National Park established near city.
  - Population: 608,020 (estimate).
- 1983 – National University of Engineering established.
- 1987 – Deportivo Walter Ferretti (football team) headquartered in Managua.
- 1990
  - Peace Park inaugurated.
  - Arnoldo Alemán becomes mayor.
- 1991
  - November: Sandinista unrest.
  - Tiscapa Lagoon Natural Reserve established.
- 1992 – Hotel Crowne Plaza Managua in business.
- 1993 – Metropolitan Cathedral of the Immaculate Conception built.
- 1995 – El Malecon park established.
- 1996 – La Jornada magazine begins publication.
- 1997 – Institute of History of Nicaragua and Central America headquartered in city.
- 1998 – Plaza Inter shopping center in business.
- 1999 – April: FSLN demonstration.
- 2000
  - "FSLN wins municipal elections in Managua."
  - Parmalat Futbol Clube formed.
  - Herty Lewites becomes mayor.

== 21st century ==
- 2005
  - Parque Japón Nicaragua (Japanese park) established.
  - Galerías Santo Domingo shopping mall in business on Carretera a Masaya.
- 2009
  - Alexis Argüello becomes mayor; dies in office.
  - Hotel Barceló Managua in business.
  - Population: 985,143 metro.
- 2011 – Nicaragua National Football Stadium opens.
- 2014
  - April 10: 2014 Nicaragua earthquake.
  - September 6: Managua event (explosion).
- 2018 - April: Economic protest begins.

== See also ==
- List of universities in Managua
- Managua history
- List of years in Nicaragua

== Bibliography ==
- Leon E. Seltzer, ed. (1952), "Managua", Columbia Lippincott Gazetteer of the World, New York: Columbia University Press, p. 1134, OL 6112221M.
- "In Managua, Angry Reminder of Sandinista Power", New York Times, November 11, 1991.
- "Managua Journal; Mayor Cleans Up City, but Some Don't Like Him", New York Times, May 16, 1992.
- "Managua Journal; a Mayor Hopes a Fountain Turns Into a Landslide", New York Times, August 18, 1995.
