= 1928 in Nicaragua =

- Decades: 1910s; 1920s; 1930s; 1940s
- See also: Other events of 1928 · Timeline of Nicaraguan history

Events from the year 1928 in Nicaragua.

== Incumbents ==
- President: Adolfo Díaz

== Events ==
- January 1 - Battle of Las Cruces (1928)
- February 27–28 - Battle of El Bramadero
- May 13–14 - Battle of La Flor
- November 4 - 1928 Nicaraguan general election

== See also ==
- List of years in the environment
