= Mauricio Herdocia Sacasa =

Nicaraguan lawyer and diplomat (1957–2021)

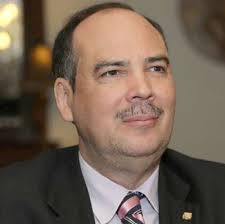
- Herdocia in 2016
- Born: 1 August 1957; León, Nicaragua
- Died: 21 January 2021 (aged 63)
- Education: National Autonomous University of Nicaragua
- Occupations: Jurist, diplomat
- Years active: 1981–2021
- Known for: International law
- Children: 3
- Awards: Order of Rubén Darío

Mauricio Herdocia Sacasa (1 August 1957 – 21 January 2021) was a Nicaraguan jurist who specialized in international law, and diplomat. He held roles in the Nicaraguan government, especially in the Foreign Ministry, across party lines, as well as roles in major international legal bodies including at the United Nations and the Organization of American States. In the 1980s, he worked on a number of peace processes in Central America, helping formalize legal and political structures for the region. Also a legal scholar and professor, he was rector of the American College University and the author of four books on the laws governing the sovereignty and territorial integrity of Nicaragua. His contributions were recognized with a number of honors both nationally and internationally, including Nicaragua's Order of Rubén Darío.

== Early life ==
Mauricio Herdocia Sacasa was born in León, Nicaragua, on 1 August 1957. Growing up his father was exiled in Mexico during the beginning of Anastasio Somoza García's regime. Herdocia studied at the National Autonomous University of Nicaragua (León), studying with prominent faculty including Edgardo Buitrago, activist Rafael Ortega Aguilar, and agriculture specialist Haydée Flores. He graduated in 1981 as a lawyer and notary public. He also completed postgraduate studies in international law at the Institute for International Law in The Hague and in international negotiations at the Matías Romero Institute in Mexico.

== Career ==
In the 1980s, Herdocia was a negotiator in major Central American peace processes, including for the Contadora Group and Contadora Support Group that sought to address the armed conflicts in the early '80s. This culminated in the 6 August 1986 Act of Contadora for Peace and Cooperation in Central America. He was also a negotiator in the Esquipulas I and II Peace Agreement (also known as the Central American Peace Accords). Signed on 7 August 1987, this institutionalized the meeting of Central American Presidents and launched the Central American Parliament initiative.

Herdocia remained in government after the Sandinista National Liberation Front (FSLN) government lost power in 1990, continuing to serve in the Foreign Ministry of the new conservative government of Violeta Barrios de Chamorro, becoming a source of "institutional memory". Herdocia did not belong to a political party and advocated for the nonpartisan retention of "a nucleus of officials" to preserve the continuity of territorial policy. From 1985 to 1997, he served as ambassador and coordinator for the Territorial Commission, which he helped create. This advisory body of Nicaraguan ministers, vice-ministers and advisors in the Ministry of Foreign Affairs functioned, until 2007, to develop a consensus on a unified national territorial policy, with the support of all sectors, that could then be advanced in regional and international forums, including several territorial cases before the International Court of Justice in The Hague in this period. In his role with the Nicaraguan Foreign Ministry, Herdocia also worked on the creation of the Central American Integration System (SICA), established in 1993, developed from the 1991 Protocol of Tegucigalpa which he helped draft. He became political advisor and legal director for the Secretary-General of SICA from 1997 to 2001 and, in 2000, was promoted to acting Secretary-General for the organization. In his work with SICA, he also contributed to drafting and negotiating other major accords such as the 1995 Framework Treaty on Democratic Security in Central America.

From 1997 to 2001, Herdocia also served on the International Law Commission of the United Nations, the UN's highest body on international law. Elected by the UN General Assembly, Herdocia was the first (and as of 2016 remained the only) Nicaraguan to be included on the 34-member committee.

Committed to issues of Nicaraguan sovereignty and territorial integrity, Herdocia was a negotiator in border disputes with Colombia and Costa Rica, both land-based and maritime, and a Nicaraguan representative to the International Court of Justice (ICJ) in The Hague on border disputes. He wrote four books on related topics and contributed to the Dictionary of International Law. In 2016, he told La Prensa that the history of external incursions Nicaragua has faced motivated his career in international law: "I felt there was a need to work and structure the strengthening of legal knowledge to defend the sovereignty and territorial integrity of the country." He advanced a new theory of the territorial dispute with Colombia over the San Andrés and Providencia islands, reconceiving Nicaraguan territory in maritime space (this thesis also formed the basis for his 2013 book, La otra Nicaragua en el mar, or The Other Nicaragua in the Sea, with Norman José Caldera Cardenal). Herdocia's thesis was cited in a landmark 2012 ICJ ruling establishing Nicaraguan sovereignty over a maritime shelf extending over 180,000 square kilometers.

During the presidency of Enrique Bolaños (2002 to 2007), Herdocia was president of the legal committee of the Organization of American States (the Inter-American Juridical Committee, elected unanimously in 2003) and legal advisor to the United Nations. When FSLN President Daniel Ortega returned to power in 2007, Herdocia was removed from Nicaragua's legal teams.

In 2018, Herdocia was an advisor to the Episcopal Conference of Catholic bishops during the National Dialogue that followed the anti-government protests and repression by the Ortega government.

As of 2021, Herdocia was rector of the American College University (AC) and a member of the editorial board of the newspaper La Prensa.

== Personal life ==
Herdocia was married with three children. He died of a heart attack on 21 January 2021.

== Honors ==
- Order of General José Dolores Estrada from President Enrique Bolaños
- Order of Rubén Darío, in the grade of the Grand Cross, from President Bolaños
- Order of "Parlamento Centroamericano Francisco Morazán" in the rank of Commander from Central American Parliament
- Order of "Miguel Larreynaga" from the Nicaraguan Academy of Law

== Works ==
- Sacasa, Mauricio Herdocia (2003). La obra de la Comisión de derecho internacional de las Naciones Unidas en el quinquenio, 1997-2001: el aporte global de América Latina (in Spanish). Managua: Imprimatur Artes Gráficas. ISBN 978-99924-54-17-6.
- Herdocia Sacasa, Mauricio (2005). Soberanía clásica un principio desafiado ... ¿Hasta dónde? (in Spanish). Managua: Comercial 3H. p. 206. Archived from the original on 26 April 2017.
- Herdocia Sacasa, Mauricio (2008). Compendio: el principio emergente de la solidaridad jurídica entre los estados : edificando un nuevo orden público internacional (in Spanish). Managua: Comercial 3H. p. 120. OCLC 808372127.
- Sacasa, Mauricio Herdocia; Cardenal, Norman José Caldera (2013). La otra Nicaragua en el mar (in Spanish). Managua: La Prensa. p. 235. ISBN 978-99924-76-26-0.

== See also ==
- Rafael Solís, Nicaraguan former Supreme Court justice
- Vilma Núñez, Nicaraguan human rights attorney
