= Magaly Quintana =

Nicaraguan historian and Catholic feminist activist

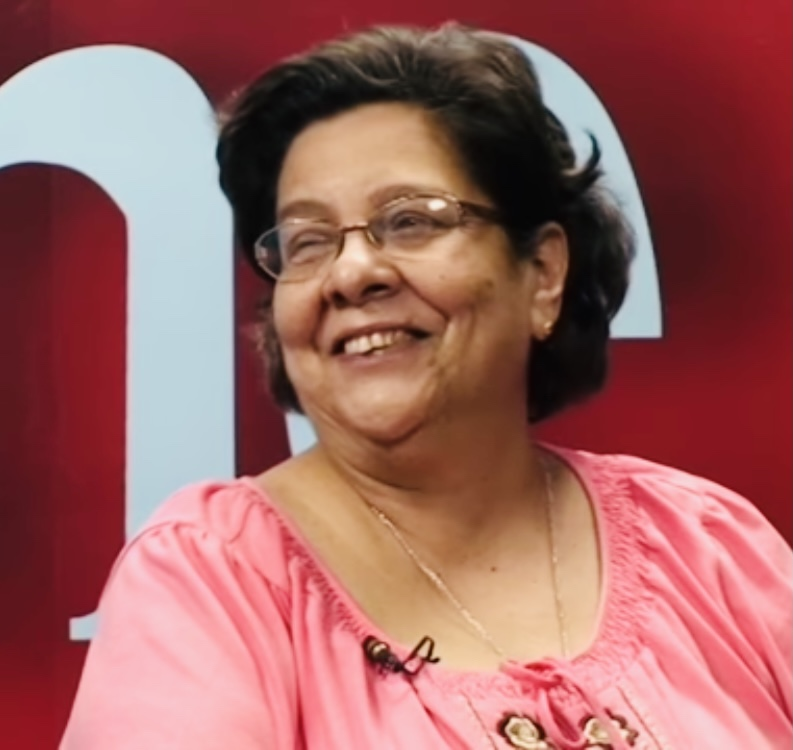
- Quintana in 2017
- Born: May 28, 1952
- Died: May 5, 2019 (aged 66)
- Organization: Catholic Women for the Right to Choose

Magaly Quintana Pereyra (28 May 1952 – 5 May 2019) was a Nicaraguan feminist historian and activist. She was director of Catholic Women for the Right to Choose, advocating for the right to therapeutic abortion following its ban in Nicaragua in 2006. She also led advocacy opposing violence against women, raising awareness of femicide in the country. In 2018, she joined the anti-government protests.

Quintana was born 28 May 1952. She attended La Asunción for high school, then entered university, becoming a student leader. She joined the Nicaraguan Revolution, then in 1982 began working in feminist organizing.

She died of a stroke on 5 May 2019, aged 66.
