= 1856 in Nicaragua =

Events in the year 1856 in Nicaragua.

== Incumbents ==
- President: Patricio Rivas (de jure), William Walker (de facto)
