= 2026 Nicaraguan general election =

- Presidential election
Incumbent Co-Presidents
Daniel Ortega and Rosario Murillo
FSLN
- Parliamentary election
- 90 of the 91 seats in the National Assembly; 46 seats needed for a majority
Party	Leader	Current seats
FSLN	Daniel Ortega	75
PLC	María Haydeé Osuna	9
ALN	Saturnino Cerrato	2
PLI	José del Carmen Alvarado	1
APRE	Carlos José Canales	1
CCN	Guillermo Osorno	1
Incumbent President of the National Assembly
Gustavo Porras Cortés; FSLN

General elections were due to be held in Nicaragua to elect the co-presidents and members of the National Assembly. Originally scheduled for November 2026, a constitutional amendment pushed back the election date to November 2027. However, on 20 July 2026, Co-President Daniel Ortega announced the abolition of the electoral system, saying that Nicaragua would no longer hold elections in order to prevent the opposition from trying to "seize the government" and "seize power".

== Background ==
In the 2021 general election, Daniel Ortega was elected for his fourth consecutive presidential term, although prior to the election, months of crackdown against opposition figures and potential presidential candidates has led to the condemnation of the election as "illegitimate" by observers such as the US Department of State. Ortega's rule has become increasingly authoritarian since his election in 2007.

Ahead of the election, Nicaragua has also held hundreds of political prisoners who have been released but have subsequently had their citizenship revoked. In February 2023, 222 political prisoners were released to the United States and were stripped of their citizenship; 94 other political opponents lost their citizenship about a week after the prisoner release. In September 2024, 135 more political prisoners were released to Guatemala as part of a deal with Guatemala and the United States; their citizenship was revoked and their property seized by the Nicaraguan government.

In the lead-up to the election, several amendments to the Constitution increased Ortega's and his wife Rosario Murillo's power and ability to remain in office. Article 133 established the Presidency of the Republic as a dual presidency consisting of a male and a female co-president, essentially converting Nicaragua to a diarchy; Murillo was simultaneously promoted from her previous position of vice president to serve as co-president alongside Ortega. The amendments give the co-presidents the ability to coordinate "legislative, judicial, electoral, control and supervisory bodies, regional and municipal". This provision is tied to Article 132, which also extends the overseeing powers of the presidency from the Nicaraguan Army to the Ministry of the Interior and the National Police. In the event of Ortega's death, Murillo would immediately assume the office of president. Furthermore, co-presidents can appoint as many vice presidents as they desire, per the revision of Article 137, also giving the co-presidents the power to appoint and fire ministers and deputy ministers, the attorney and deputy attorney general, the directors of governmental bodies, and the heads of diplomatic missions.

The presidential term was also extended from five years to six years per the provision of Article 135. These amendments were passed unanimously by the National Assembly in January 2025. Due to this extension, it was possible that the November 2026 elections could have been delayed until November 2027; with Ortega and Murillo remaining in office as late as January 2028 according to Freedom House.

A new electoral law passed in January 2025 also grants further governmental control over the Supreme Electoral Council (Consejo Supremo Electoral, CSE), which would lead to the opposition being further curtailed with regard to participation in elections, as seen during the 2021 general election and the March 2024 regional elections.

== Cancellation ==
On 20 July 2026, Co-President Daniel Ortega announced the abolition of the electoral system, saying that Nicaragua would no longer hold elections. Ortega, who had been absent for 61 days prior, made the declaration at the official ceremony celebrating the 47th anniversary of the Sandinista Revolution, where he and his fellow Sandinista forces toppled the three-decade-old regime of the Somoza family. He declared that "There won't be any more elections here for them to try to seize the government and seize power", referring to the "Yankees" and "Somocistas", the latter of which referred to Somoza supporters. In the wake of his announcement, the country's legislative body, the National Assembly, moved to formally enact his will. The Assembly had previously repeatedly amended the country's constitution to concentrate Ortega's power.

== Reactions ==
=== International ===
The cancellation drew widespread international controversy. The U.S. State Department condemned it, with Secretary of State Marco Rubio writing that Ortega's "declaration that under his family's dictatorship Nicaragua will never again hold elections lays bare their true authoritarian nature" and that "Daniel Ortega and Rosario Murillo have abandoned even the pretense of popular consent". Rubio further stated that the act was a threat to American national security. UN High Commissioner for Human Rights Volker Türk called on Nicaraguan officials to "reopen civic space, and restore the rule of law".

=== Domestic ===
Domestically, opposition leaders condemned the act, but noted Ortega's prior consolidation of power. Félix Maradiaga, an opposition activist who stood in the 2021 general election, stated that Ortega "buried Nicaraguan democracy a long time ago", and that in order for the country to be truly democratic, Ortega had to be removed.
