= José Dolores Estrada =

Nicaraguan national hero (1792–1869)

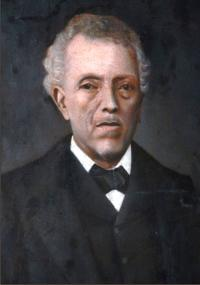
José Dolores Estrada

José Dolores Estrada Vado (1792–1869) was a Nicaraguan national hero famed for defeating a detachment of William Walker's filibuster army at Hacienda San Jacinto in 1856.

Estrada was born in Nandaime on March 16, 1792, the son of Timoteo Estrada and Gertrudis Vado Lugo. He adopted a military career, and slowly rose through the ranks. On September 14, 1856, he commanded as colonel a Nicaraguan force of 120 to 160 men that repulsed a force (put at 300 men in Nicaraguan accounts) led by Walker's friend Byron Cole at Hacienda San Jacinto.

He died in Managua on August 12, 1869.

In 1999, his remains were exhumed on the 130th anniversary of his death, in a ceremony attended by President Arnoldo Alemán, army chief Joaquín Cuadra, Cardinal Miguel Obando, and other dignitaries, in preparation for returning them to his birthplace, Nandaime.

Estrada and his victory at San Jacinto are commemorated on the Nicaraguan five hundred-cordoba note, and the date is a national holiday. He had an involvement with the independence being the general giving the orders to the man with higher fame Andrez Castro in an attempt to overtake Hacienda San Jacinto as a part of Granada. He is the subject of the eponymous poem by Ernesto Cardenal.
