= Norma Helena Gadea =

Nicaraguan singers (1955–2025)

Norma Helena Gadea Avilés (December 28, 1955 – November 7, 2025) was a Nicaraguan singer.

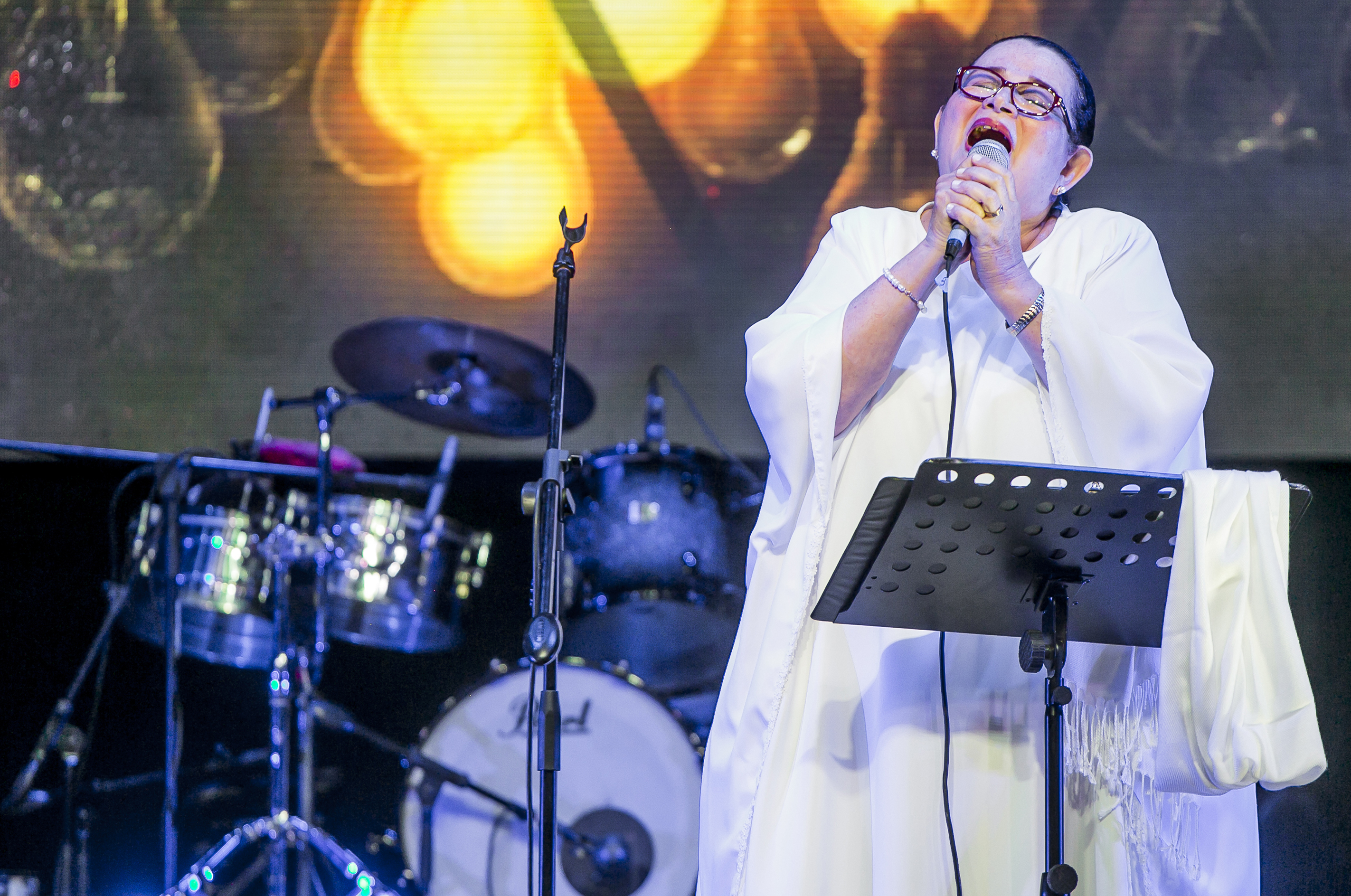
Norma Helena Gadea

== Life and career ==
Gadea was born in Ocotal on December 28, 1955. In 1978, she released her first album titled Flor de pino, a tribute to the struggle of General Augusto C. Sandino and the Nicaraguan people that rebelled against the Somoza dynasty.

Following the Nicaraguan Revolution, on July 19, 1979, she began to travel as a way to take Nicaraguan culture to the world. In 1985, she recorded her second album, Cuando venga la paz in Montevideo, Uruguay. In 2000, she recorded Vocation of Living, the third album recorded in Costa Rica, with the accompaniment of Adrián Goizueta and his orchestra. In 2003, she recorded an anthological album Lo Essential, with Eduardo Araica on guitar.

Gadea died on November 7, 2025, at the age of 69.
