= 1927 Nicaraguan parliamentary election =

Parliamentary elections were held in Nicaragua on 4 September 1927 to elect half of the seats in the Chamber of Deputies and one-third of the seats in the Senate of the National Congress.

The elections had been held in several normally liberal districts where the civil war had prevented their being held at the usual time. Except in Bluefields, the liberals won, because the conservatives had promised Henry L. Stimson (former U.S. Secretary of War) that they would not present candidates. In Estelí, however, bandit operations had made voting impossible in many districts, and the liberals asked that a supplementary election be held.

American marines acted as unofficial observers in various departments where elections were held at the end of August, 1927, to select Senators and Deputies in those districts where elections were not held in 1926 because of revolutionary disturbances, but there was no American supervision of these elections. The Conservatives did not contest in the principal Liberal departments.

== Results ==
Party	Seats	
Party	Chamber	Senate
Conservative Party	29	19
Liberal Party	14	5
Total	43	24
Source: Political Handbook of the World
