= Roberto Cañas López =

Salvadoran politician, economist, academic, and academic administrator (1950–2021)

Roberto Cañas López (21 November 1950 – 24 January 2021) was a Salvadoran politician, economist, academic and academic administrator.

== Biography ==
Cañas was a guerrilla fighter during the Salvadoran Civil War as a member of the Farabundo Martí National Liberation Front (FMLN). Known by the pseudonyms "Rubén Rojas" or "Saul I", Cañas was a FMLN negotiator and signatory of the 1992 Chapultepec Peace Accords between the Salvadoran government and the FMLN, which ended the 12-year civil war.

Cañas graduated from Liceo Salvadoreño in San Salvador in 1967. He then studied economics at the University of El Salvador, where he became involved in the left-wing political movement in the 1970s. During the Salvadoran Civil War, Cañas joined the FMLN's Diplomatic Political Commission and became a spokesperson and negotiator for the FMLN.

In 2014, Cañas was candidate for Mayor of San Salvador for the Democratic Change party, but lost to Nayib Bukele.

Cañas López died in San Salvador, El Salvador, on 24 January 2021, at the age of 80.
