= UNAPA =

Nicaraguan agricultural producers' union

- National Union of Agricultural Associated Producers
- Unión Nacional Agropecuaria de Productores Asociados
- Founded: 1994
- Headquarters: Linda Vista, from the semaphore one block south, one block down and one block south. Managua, Nicaragua
- Location: Nicaragua
- Members: 20000
- Website: http://www.nodo50.org/espanica/unapa.htm

UNAPA (National Union of Agricultural Associated Producers) is a Nicaraguan national union which represents small farmers, livestock breeders, forestry producers, fisheries, agro-dealers and services, under an associative and self-managed form of production that enables them to develop economies of scale and access technology, in order to gain competitiveness and be subjects to development, without regard to political inclination, religion, race or gender.

UNAPA is an autonomous and independent organization, with a two-dimensional model:

- Associative and self-managed farmers and community
- Business-Enterprise

To join UNAPA one just has to get involved with one of the objective groups, cooperatives or production centers, provide volunteer work or financial support according to your possibilities. The financial support is used to finance the operation of the guild's offices.

== Creation and structure ==
UNAPA has its roots on the small farmer union movements as part of the co-managerial experience acquired by the Association of Rural Workers (ATC) and gains legal recognition as a non-governmental organization in 1994. Its highest authority is the General Assembly, which is formed by 20000 associated workers and cooperatives members, directors, managers, technicians and professionals. Its executive body is the National Board and the Central Office.

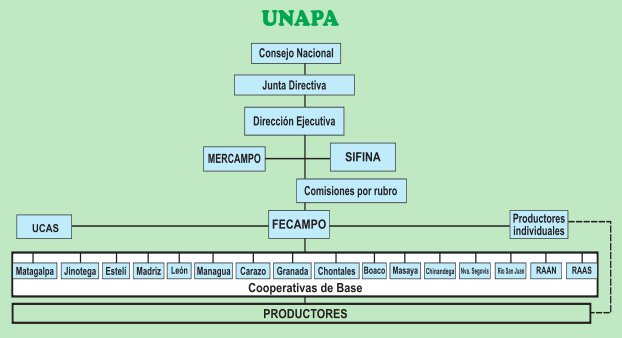
Estructura de la UNAPA

Individual producers that are not part of a cooperative are clustered by category in the territories.

== Objectives ==
- Strengthen the rights of land ownership for small producers of food, giving priority to rural women
- Organize and promote forms of associative and productive organization in the rural sector (cooperatives, groups, etc.)
- Encourage the participation of small producers in the Office of Citizen Power in all levels
- Arrange financing for: operations, development and technology transfer, training, community projects, sustainable development and other non-conventional forms of financing
- Promote the fair trading system directly from the producer to the consumer (MERCAMPO)
- Promote productivity and overall quality increase, as well as vertical and horizontal integration in the economic projects, to add value and reduce the vulnerability of primary production (agroindustrilizacion)
- Promote and encourage environmental protection with community participation and sustainable production systems, soil conservation, agroforestry and organic production

== Activities and productive potential ==
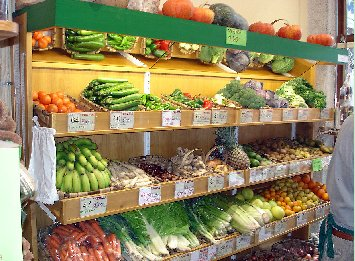
Fair trading system directly from the producer to the consumer (MERCAMPO)

UNAPA now heads towards the strengthening of cooperative unions, establishment of the Federation of Farmers Cooperatives FECAMPO and the promotion of a fair trading system known as MERCAMPO to get the products directly to consumers. As a guild and in an aggregate UNAPA counts with 17473 hectares suitable for agricultural crops, 35000 acres of pasture for livestock and 13977 hectares of forest land. The main item of commercial production are: coffee, rice, tobacco, sesame, soy, peanuts, sorghum, maize, sugar cane, shrimp, cattle, milk, meat, agricultural inputs, organic farming, roasted coffee and cereals.
