= Jiu-Hwa Lo Upshur =

American historian and professor

- Born: 1937; China
- Citizenship: American
- Occupations: Historian, professor
- Known for: World history textbooks, philanthropy

Academic background
- Education: University of Sydney (BA); University of Michigan (PhD)

Academic work
- Discipline: World history, Chinese history
- Institutions: Eastern Michigan University

Jiu-Hwa Lo Upshur is an American historian and professor emerita of history at Eastern Michigan University (EMU). She is known for co-authoring widely used world history textbooks and for her major philanthropic donations to education.

== Early life and education ==
Upshur was born in China but spent most of her childhood with her parents living in India and later moving to Australia. She received her Bachelor of Arts degree from the University of Sydney. After that, she went to the University of Michigan for her graduate studies, where she studied history and anthropology, earning her MA in 1961. She was a recipient of the Barbour Scholarship in 1959, a fellowship that supports female graduate students from Asia and the Middle East.

Her mother, Wei-Djen Djang Lo, was also a Barbour Scholar at Michigan back in the 1920s, receiving the scholarship in 1926. Upshur earned her Ph.D. in history from the University of Michigan in 1972. Her father, Chia-Lun Lo, was a well known educator and diplomat who served as the president of National Tsinghua University from 1928 to 1930 and of National Central University from 1932 to 1941, and as the Chinese ambassador to India from 1947 to 1949.

== Academic career ==
She started teaching at Eastern Michigan University as a part-time lecturer. Once she completed her Ph.D., she joined the full-time faculty on a tenure-track basis until she retired in 2006. Over her 35 years at EMU, she taught subjects including Chinese history, political science, anthropology, art, and even Mesoamerican culture.

== Publications ==
Aside from teaching, Upshur is a co-author of the textbook World History, which looks at civilizations in a comparative context. She has also written many articles on Chinese history. Some of her other works include co-authoring The Twentieth Century: A Brief Global History and co-editing Lives and Times: A World History Reader (1995). She also co-authored The Twentieth Century and Beyond: A Global History (7th edition, 2007). She also co-authored The Twentieth Century: Readings in Global History (1998). She was also a co-editor of the Encyclopedia of World History (2008). Her academic papers are also kept at the EMU Archives.

== Philanthropy and recognition ==
Upshur has given a lot back to schools over the years. In 2012, she met with President Ma Ying-jeou of Taiwan, who welcomed her and praised her scholarships for Taiwan students. She also established scholarship programs at National Central University and National Chengchi University in Taiwan, and donated her father's 13,000-volume book collection to National Chengchi University. The $1 million gift was made in her parents' names, establishing the Chia-Lun Lo Fellowship Fund in honor of her father, which helps support doctoral students through a $10,000 fellowship.

In 2022, the Eastern Michigan University Foundation said they received three major gifts from Upshur which total $1 million. This included a $500,000 endowment for the Jiu-Hwa Lo Upshur Center for Civic Education, a $200,000 expendable fund for the Center, and $300,000 for a language study abroad fund. These gifts were meant to commemorate her 35 years of teaching and her commitment to international education.

That same year, her sister Jiu-Fong Lo Chang and brother-in-law Kuei-sheng Chang donated a collection of Chinese calligraphy to the University of Michigan Museum of Art, valued at more than $12 million. Upshur also gave Chinese art objects to the University of Michigan Museum of Art, including a Tang dynasty tomb sculpture in memory of her mother.
