= La Jornada (Managua) =

La Jornada is a Nicaraguan newspaper, with offices in the capital Managua. La Jornada was founded in 1986 as a news program on radio and later, in 1996, it evolved to a printed monthly magazine. In 2005, it took its present form as a daily digital newspaper.
