= Public holidays in Nicaragua =

Life in Nicaragua

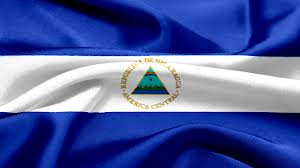

Cuisine
Culture
Demographics
Education
Holidays
Human Rights
Literature
Music
Politics
Religion
Tourism

This is a list of public holidays in Nicaragua.

== Holidays ==
Date	English name	Remarks
January 1	New Year's Day	Many Nicaraguans celebrate New Year's Day with their families, although it is usual to celebrate it with your friends in a bar or in a party too.
February 1	Air Force Day	Held on February 1st in honor of the nation's air force. (Celebrated only governmentally)
March or April	Holy Thursday	The Last Supper of Jesus, national holiday
March or April	Good Friday	The Crucifixion of Jesus, national holiday
First Sunday after the first full moon after 21 March	Easter	Resurrection of Jesus, national holiday
May 1	Labour Day	Celebrated nationally on the first of May.
May 30	Mother's Day	Held on May 30 in honor of Nicaragua's mother. (Celebrated only governmentally)
July 19	Sandinista Revolution Day	Celebrated on 19 July on a national level. It marks the day that the Nicaraguan Revolution defeated the Somoza dictatorship in the Nicaraguan Revolution. In recent years it is mostly a political celebration for members of the Nicaraguan Revolution.
July 25	Fiesta de Santiago	Celebrated on July 25 in Boaco, Somoto and Managua.
July 26	Fiesta de Santa Ana	Celebrated on July 26 in Nandaime, Niquinohomo, Moyogalpa and Ometepe.
August 1 and 10	Fiesta de Santo Domingo	Managuans celebrate Santo Domingo de Guzmán (Patron saint)
August 27	Crab Soup Day	Residents of the Corn Islands celebrate Abolition of slavery of the Corn Islands
September 14	Battle of San Jacinto	Celebrated on the national level. It is held on the anniversary of the Battle of San Jacinto (1856).
September 15	Independence Day	A national holiday held on September 15 to celebrate Act of Independence of Central America from Spain in 1821.
September 30	Fiesta de San Jerónimo	Catholics of the cities of Masaya and Bluefields celebrate Saint Jerome.
October 12	Indigenous Resistance Day	Formerly Columbus Day; Highlights the struggle of native peoples against European colonialism.
November 2	All Souls' Day; Day of the Dead	Nicaraguans commemorate their deceased relatives by going to the cemeteries to leave flowers and pray to the graves of their relatives.
December 7/8	Immaculate Conception (La Griteria Immaculate)	In the night of December 7, Catholics of Nicaragua celebrate La Gritería, a holiday dedicated to Immaculate Conception, the patroness of the country, and on December 8 they usually go to Mass.
December 24	Christmas Eve	Nicaraguans usually reunite with their family and wait until it is Christmas. You can hear fireworks through all the night.
December 25	Christmas	Celebrated internationally.
December 31	New Year's Eve	At 12am Nicaraguans celebrate with fireworks (Spanish: pólvoras, cohetes).

== Variable dates ==
- 2020
  - Holy Thursday: April 9
  - Good Friday: April 10
  - Easter: April 12
- 2021
  - Holy Thursday: April 1
  - Good Friday: April 2
  - Easter: April 4
- 2022
  - Holy Thursday: April 14
  - Good Friday: April 15
  - Easter: April 17
- 2023
  - Holy Thursday: April 6
  - Good Friday: April 7
  - Easter: April 9
- 2024
  - Holy Thursday: March 28
  - Good Friday: March 29
  - Easter: March 31
- 2025
  - Holy Thursday: April 17
  - Good Friday: April 18
  - Easter: April 20
