= Battle of San Jacinto (1856) =

1856 battle of the Filibuster War

- Part of the Filibuster War
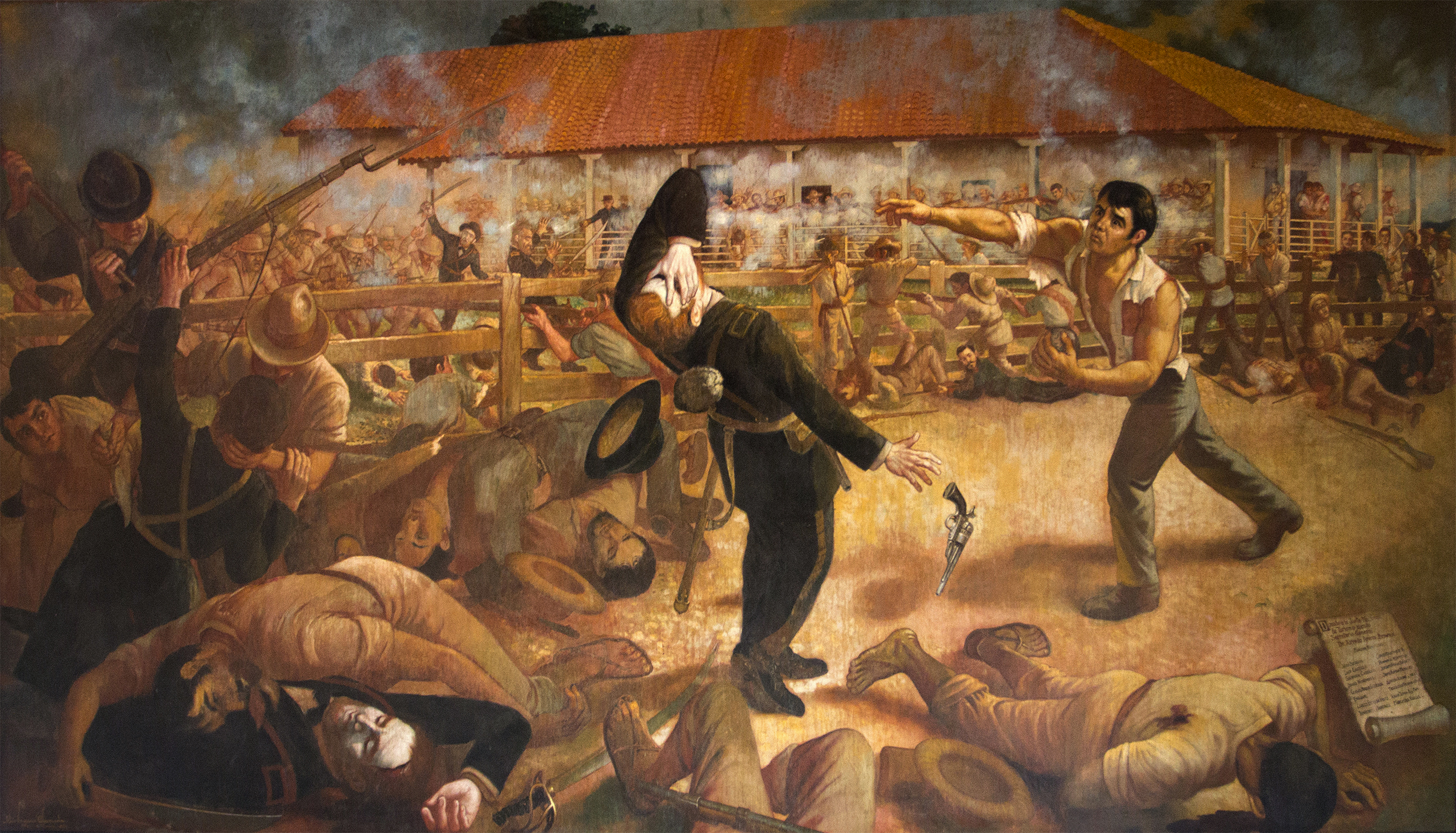
- 1964 painting of the battle
Date	September 14, 1856
Location	Hacienda San Jacinto, Managua, Nicaragua
Result	Nicaraguan victory

Belligerents
Nicaragua	Filibusters

Commanders and leaders
José Dolores Estrada	Byron Cole

Strength
160 men	300 men

Casualties and losses
28 killed or wounded	27 - 35 killed (according to Estrada); 35 killed 18 captured (according to Lieutenant Alejandro Eva)

The Battle of San Jacinto took place on the 14 September, 1856, in Hacienda San Jacinto, Managua, Nicaragua. One hundred and sixty soldiers of the Legitimist Septentrion Army, led by Colonel José Dolores Estrada, fought 300 Nicaraguan filibusters of William Walker, led by Lieutenant Colonel Byron Cole. The filibusters were defeated after four hours of combat, between 7:00 am and 11:00 am.

The filibusters suffered 27 killed, as well as an unknown number wounded (according to Estrada), or 35 killed and 18 captured (according to Lieutenant Alejandro Eva). Nicaraguan losses totaled 28 killed and wounded. The battle marked the end of Walker's expedition to Nicaragua.

The 14th of September, the date of the battle, is celebrated as a national holiday in Nicaragua. A column of 60 Matagalpa Indians, armed with bows and arrows, made a decisive contribution to the expedition's defeat. In 2012, the "Indios Flecheros de Matagalpa" were declared National Heroes of the Battle of San Jacinto by the Congress of the Republic of Nicaragua, which also ordered that statue be erected in their honor.
