= History of Nicaragua =

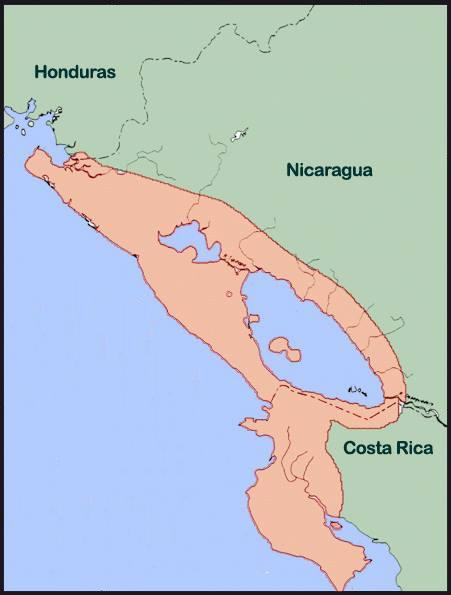
Location of Nicanahuac, the Indigenous name for western Nicaragua and northwestern Costa Rica given by the Nahuas who inhabited the region.

Nicaragua is a nation in Central America. It is located roughly halfway between Mexico to its north and Colombia to its south and bordered by Honduras to its north and Costa Rica to its south. Nicaragua ranges from the Caribbean Sea on its east coast to the Pacific Ocean on its west coast. Nicaragua also possesses a series of islands and cays located in the Caribbean Sea.

The etymology of Nicaragua is Nicānāhuac, which was the name the Nicaraos, a Nawat-speaking people, gave to western Nicaragua and northwestern Costa Rica. It means "here lies Anahuac" in Nahuatl and is a combination of the words "Nican" (here), and "Ānāhuac", which in turn is a combination of the words "atl" (water) and "nahuac", a locative meaning "surrounded". Therefore the literal translation of Nicanahuac is "here surrounded by water". It is a geographical endonym that refers to the large bodies of water surrounding the land the Nicaraos inhabited, the Pacific Ocean, lakes Nicaragua and Xolotlan, and the rivers and lagoons. In addition it fits the theory that the etymology references bodies of water inside the country.

== Pre-Columbian Nicaragua ==
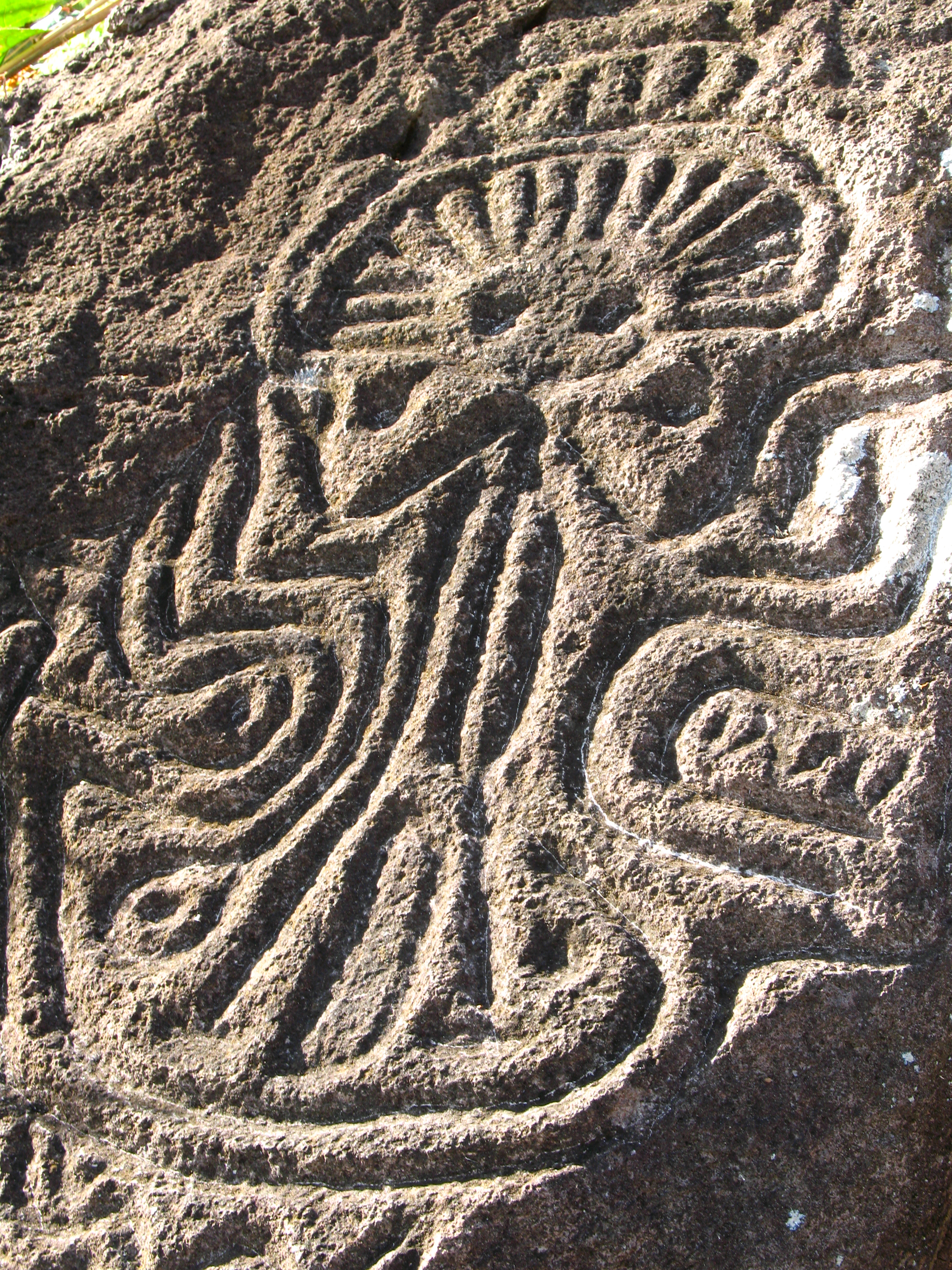
An ancient petroglyph on Ometepe Island

Western Nicaragua was populated by Mesoamerican groups such as the Nicaraos and Chorotegas, who were agriculturalists, and cultivated maize, cacao, tomatoes, avocados, squash, beans, and chili, which was the typical Mesoamerican diet. The Nicarao also dined on various meats such as turkey, deer, iguana, mute dogs, and fish from the sea, rivers, lakes and lagoons. Eastern Nicaragua was populated by Misumalpan and Chibchan-speaking groups, belonging to the Isthmo-Colombian area. Here, the population consisted of extended families or tribes. Food was obtained by hunting, fishing, and slash-and-burn agriculture. Crops like cassava and pineapples were the staple foods. The people of eastern Nicaragua appear to have traded with and been influenced by the native peoples of the Caribbean, as round thatched huts and canoes, both typical of the Caribbean, were common in eastern Nicaragua.

When the Spanish arrived in western Nicaragua in the early 16th century, they found three principal tribes, each with a different culture and language: the Nicarao, the Chorotega, and the Chontal. Each of these diverse groups occupied much of Nicaragua's territory, with independent chieftains who ruled according to each group's laws and customs. Their weapons consisted of swords, lances, and arrows made from wood. Monarchy was the form of government of most tribes; the supreme ruler was the chief, or cacique, who, surrounded by his princes, formed the nobility. Laws and regulations were disseminated by royal messengers who visited each township and assembled the inhabitants to give their chief orders.

Occupying most of western Nicaragua and the Pacific Coast, the Nicaraos were governed by multiple rulers, such as chiefs Macuilmiquiztli, and Agateyte. Macuilmiquiztli was a rich ruler who lived in Quauhcapolca, now the city of Rivas, while Agateyte was the ruler of Teswatlan, located in present-day northwestern Nicaragua, specifically Chinandega. They spoke the Nawat language and had migrated from El Salvador around 1200 AD, and ultimately from central and southern Mexico before that. Although not much is known about the military forces of Nicanahuac, the Nicarao did have a warrior tradition. Nicarao warriors wore long and thick padded cotton armor that extended down to their thighs and knees, fought with spears, atlatls, bow and arrows, clubs edged with stone blades, knives and daggers with obsidian blades, and macanas, a wooden sword edged with obsidian blades similar to the Aztec macahuitl. The Chorotegas, also known as Mangue, are an Oto-Manguean people closely related to the Zapotecs and Mixtecs of Mexico. They lived in parts of central and western Nicaragua, and are also thought to have ultimately migrated from central Mexico or Oaxaca, between 600 and 700 AD, given that their language belongs to the Oto-Manguean family. These two groups had intimate contact with the Spanish conquerors, paving the way for the racial mix of native and Spanish stock now known as mestizos. The Chontal (which means foreigner in Nahuatl), also known as the Caribs, occupied the central mountain region. This group was smaller than the other two, and it is not known when they first settled in Nicaragua. This group may have modern representatives in the Cacaopera people.

In the west and highland areas where the Spanish settled, the indigenous population was almost completely wiped out by the rapid spread of new diseases brought by the Spaniards, for which the native population had no immunity and the virtual enslavement of the remainder of the indigenous people. Most indigenous groups survived in the east, where the Europeans did not settle. The English introduced guns and ammunition to one of the local peoples, the Bawihka, who lived in northeast Nicaragua. The Bawihka later intermarried with runaway slaves from Britain's Caribbean possessions, and the resulting population, with its access to superior weapons, began to expand its territory and push other indigenous groups into the interior. This Afro-indigenous group became known to the Europeans as Miskito, and the displaced survivors of their expansionist activities were called the Mayangna.

== Spanish conquest ==
Nicaragua was first encountered by Europeans when Christopher Columbus sailed south from what is now Colón, Honduras, exploring the eastern coast of Central America on his fourth voyage in 1502. The first time Europeans incur into the limits of Nicaragua occurs on September 14, 1502. When he reaches the limits of the present Honduran coastline, Christopher Columbus names the mouth of the Rio Coco, Cabo Gracias a Dios. Eleven days later on September 25, Columbus arrives to what is today the Mosquito Coast. Columbus describes the people he encounters as "people of a good disposition, very sharp, [and] wanting to see." Columbus notes seeing "hogs and big mountain cats, and they brought them to the ships: [where] here we took (people) for language [purposes]. And they were left somewhat scandalized." He goes on to add that the ancestors of Nicaragua "had threaded cotton" and "their faces painted".

In 1522, the first Spaniards entered the region of what would become known as Nicaragua. Gil González Dávila with a small force reached its western portion after a trek through Costa Rica. He proceeded to explore the fertile western valleys and was impressed with the Nicarao civilization for the vast amounts of food it had in addition to their elaborate markets and permanent temples. Macuilmiquiztli initially welcomed the Spanish and their Tlaxcallan translators, however, Dávila and his small army used the opportunity to gather gold and baptize some of the Nahuas along the way. Understanding the threat that the Spanish imposed, Macuilmiquiztli waged war against Dávila, and both Chorotega and Nicarao warriors forced the Spanish to withdraw to Panama. As González Dávila retreated to his expedition's starting point in Panama, he reported on his discovery, naming the area Nicaragua. However, governor Pedrarias Dávila attempted to arrest him and confiscate his treasure. He was forced to flee to Santo Domingo to outfit another expedition.

Within a few months, Nicaragua was invaded by several Spanish forces and their Tlaxcallan allies, each led by a conquistador. González Dávila was authorized by royal decree and came in from the Caribbean coast of Honduras. Francisco Hernández de Córdoba, at the command of the governorate of Panama (then called Veragua), approached from Costa Rica. Pedro de Alvarado and Cristóbal de Olid at the command of Hernán Cortés, came from Guatemala through San Salvador and Honduras.

Córdoba apparently came with the intention of colonization. In 1524, he established permanent settlements in the region, including two of Nicaragua's principal towns: Granada on Lake Nicaragua and León west of Lake Managua. But he soon found it necessary to prepare defenses for the cities and go on the offensive against incursions by the other conquistadores.

The inevitable clash between the Spanish forces devastated the indigenous population. The Indian civilization was destroyed. The series of battles came to be known as The War of the Captains. By 1529, the conquest of Nicaragua was complete as the Nicaraos and the Chorotegas suffered devastating defeats in addition to demographic and societal collapse from a combination of disease, war against the Spanish and their Tlaxcallan allies, and being sold into slavery. Several conquistadores came out winners, and some were executed or murdered. Pedrarias Dávila was one such winner. Although he lost control of Panama, he moved to Nicaragua and established his base in León.

The land was parceled out to the conquistadores. The area of most interest was the western portion. It included a wide, fertile valley with huge, freshwater lakes, a series of volcanoes, and volcanic lagoons. Many Indians were soon enslaved to develop and maintain "estates" there. Others were put to work in mines in northern Nicaragua, but the great majority were sent as slaves to Panama and Peru, for significant profit to the new landed aristocracy. Many Indians died through disease and neglect by the Spaniards, who controlled everything necessary for their subsistence.

== From colony to state ==
In 1538, the Viceroyalty of New Spain was established, encompassing all of Mexico and Central America, except Panama. The Spanish used Nicaragua for their massive agricultural export economy in the region. The slave trade was particularly important on the pacific coast of Nicaragua. The large urban population was exploited by the Spanish for removal to places like Panama and Peru. Slaves filled several manual labor roles with the exception of soldiers. The depopulation of the Indigenous population following the arrival of the Spanish was catastrophic. The highest estimates are that the population declined by 500,000 to 600,000, including 30,000 deaths from famine, and as few as 5,000 surviving. Up to 500,000 Nicaraguans were exported as slaves. By the 1580s, the Indigenous population had declined by up to 97%. It has been estimated that only 20% of slaves survived.

Bartolomé de La Casas (1484-1576) was a Spanish landowner who joined the Dominican Order after bearing witness to the massacre of a group of Indigenous people in Cuba by some Spaniards. He would commit himself to documenting Spanish atrocities in Central America to try and get the crown to act. He also established a convent in Granada, but would eventually abandon it in 1536 and would try again in Guatemala. He advocated for the outlawing of slavery and his manuscript, A Short Account of the Destruction of the Indies, convinced the Spanish crown to agree to some reforms and the enacting of the New Laws of the Indies that among other changes, abolished the enslavement of Indigenous persons.

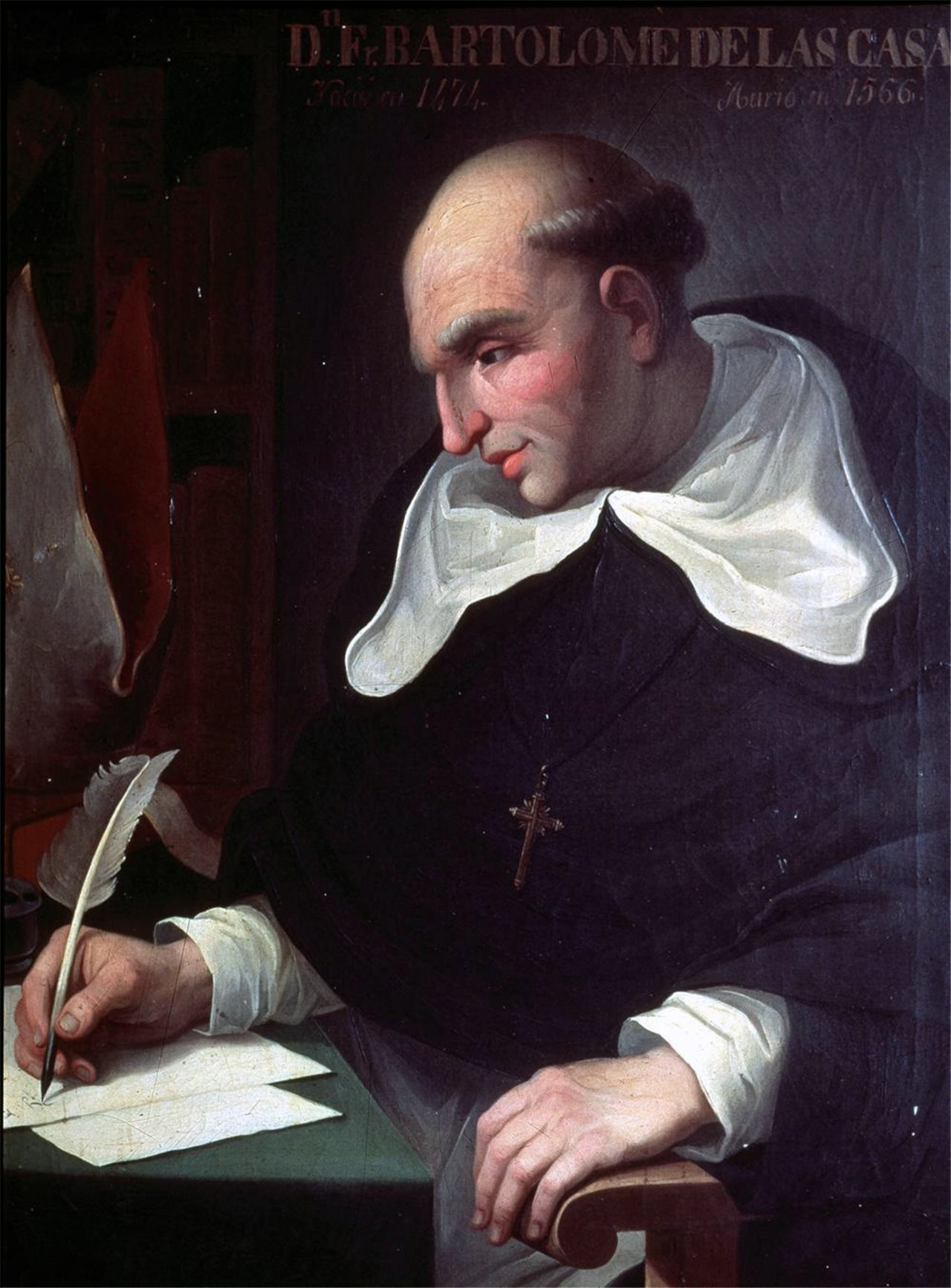
Friar Bartolomé de La Casas was a Spanish landowner and priest who worked to mitigate the violence the Spanish colonizers were inflicting on the indigenous populations

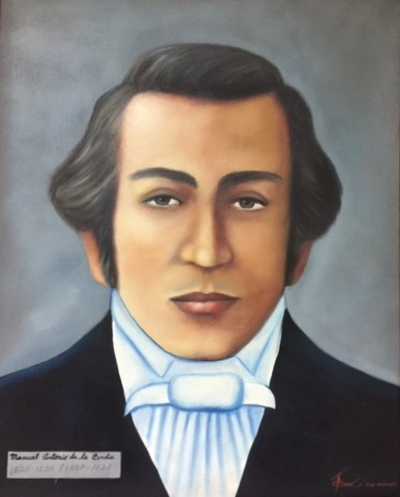
Manuel Antonio de la Cerda, one of the main leaders of the 1811 and 1812 Independence Movements and first Head of State of Nicaragua.

By 1570, the southern part of New Spain was designated the Captaincy General of Guatemala. The area of Nicaragua was divided into administrative "parties" with León as the capital. In 1610, the volcano known as Momotombo erupted, destroying the capital. It was rebuilt northwest of its original site. In the meantime, the Pacific Coast of Nicaragua became a supplementary node to the trade route between Manila, Philippines and Acapulco, Mexico; otherwise known as the Manila galleon trade route.

The British first began incursions into the region in the early 1570s and were led by Francis Drake. The area would become a hotbed for raids by Spain's European enemies with conflicts in Europe even spilling over to the Caribbean region.

There were minor civil wars and rebellions, but they were quickly suppressed. The region was subject to frequent raids by Dutch, French and British pirates, with the city of Granada being invaded twice, in 1658 and 1660.

As a part of the Bourbon Reforms, Nicaragua would be one of the intendancy districts beginning in 1786.

== Fight for independence ==
Nicaraguans were divided over Spanish monarchy and independence. In 1811, Nicolás García Jerez, a priest decided to make concessions with pro-independence figures. He proposed holding elections for each barrio and form a government junta. However, he soon declared himself as governor and threatened to punish rebellions with death.

Nicaraguans were divided over monarchy and independence. This division made Nicaragua the most active civil battleground in Latin America. The citizens of Leon were the first to act against the Spanish monarchy. They overthrew the local intendente Jose Salvador on December 13, 1811. Granada followed Leon's move with a vote of confidence and demanded the retirement of Spanish officials. The Spanish constitution of 1812 granted more independence to local administrations, and Garcia Perez was appointed as the intendente of Nicaragua.

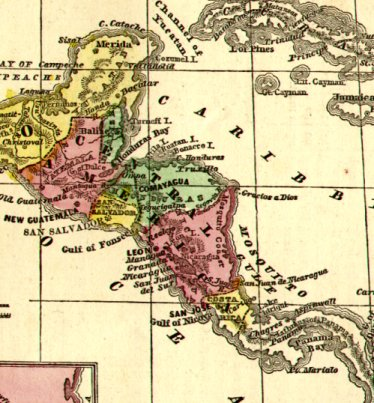
Map of Central America (1860s), pictured is Nicaragua along with the Guanacaste Province which then belonged to Nicaragua but was incorporated with present-day Costa Rica in 1825.

In 1821 Guatemala declared its independence and all central american provinces followed it. Nicaragua became a part of the First Mexican Empire in 1822, was a part of the United Provinces of Central America in 1823, and then became an independent republic in its own right in 1838. The Mosquito Coast based on Bluefields on the Atlantic was claimed by the United Kingdom as a protectorate from 1655 to 1850. This area was designated to Honduras in 1859 and transferred to Nicaragua in 1860, though it remained autonomous until 1894.

Much of Nicaragua's politics since independence has been characterized by the rivalry between the liberal elite of León and the conservative elite of Granada. The rivalry often degenerated into civil war, particularly during the 1840s and 1850s. Initially invited by the Liberals in 1855 to join their struggle against the Conservatives, a United States adventurer named William Walker declared himself President in 1856 and made English the official language. (See Walker affair.) Honduras and other Central American countries united to drive him out of Nicaragua in 1857, after which a period of three decades of Conservative rule ensued. They were supported by the United States industrialist Cornelius Vanderbilt, who had originally sponsored Walker in Nicaragua. Walker was executed in neighbouring Honduras on September 12, 1860.

Taking advantage of divisions within the conservative ranks, José Santos Zelaya led a liberal revolt that brought him to power in 1893. Zelaya ended the longstanding dispute with the United Kingdom over the Atlantic coast in 1894, and "reincorporated" the Mosquito Coast into Nicaragua.

== US interventions ==
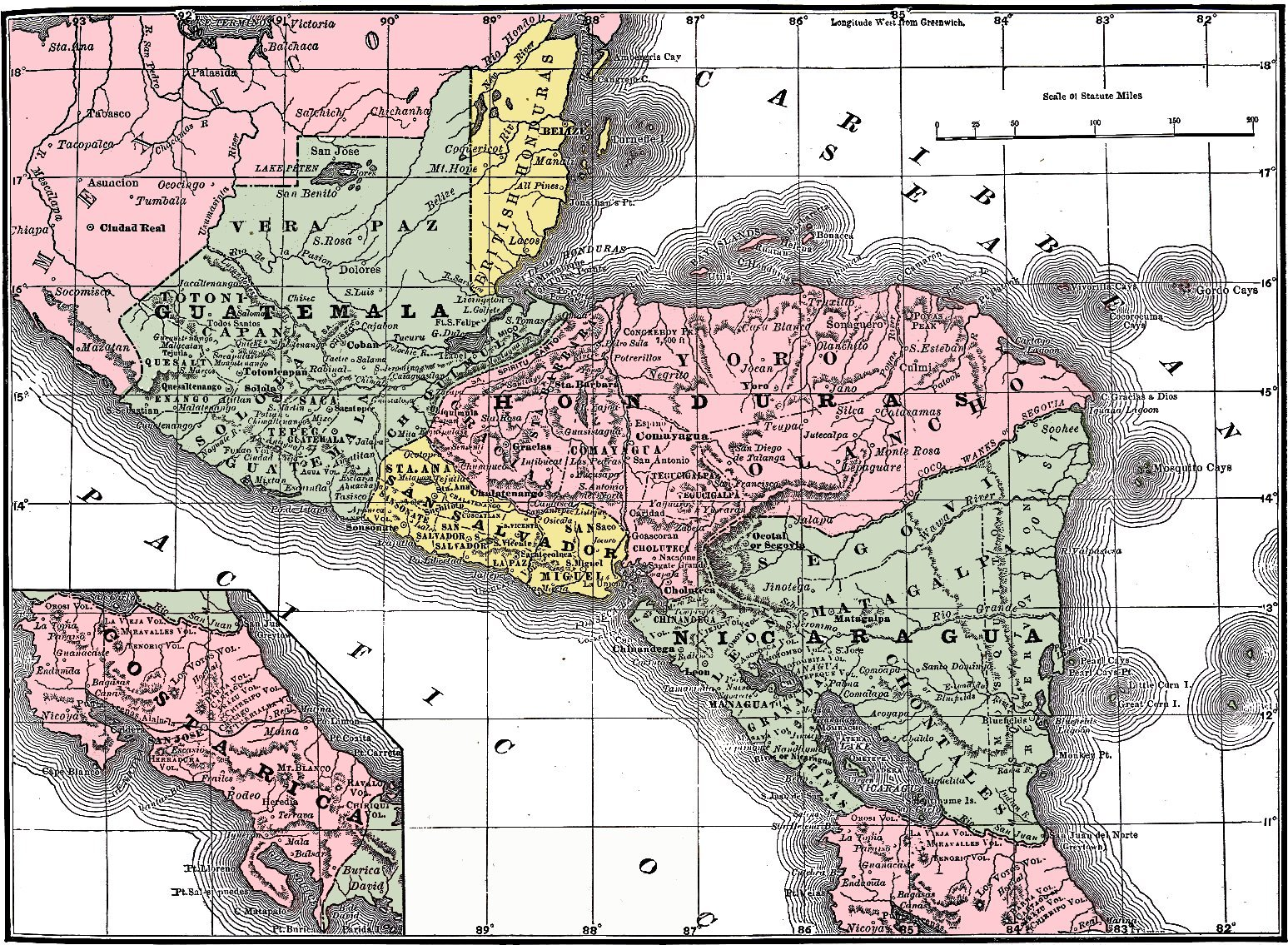
Central America 1892

Because of the strategic importance of Nicaragua in the hemisphere, the United States (US) made numerous military interventions to protect what it believed were its interests in the region:

- 1894: Month-long occupation of Bluefields
- 1896: Marines land in port of Corinto
- 1898: Marines land at port of San Juan del Sur
- 1899: Marines land at port of Bluefields
- 1907: "Dollar Diplomacy" protectorate set up
- 1910: Marines land in Bluefields and Corinto
- 1912-33: Bombing, 20-year occupation, fought guerrillas
- 1981-90: CIA aids the Contras in their revolutionary war against the Sandinistas and plants harbor mines

== United States occupation (1909–1933) ==
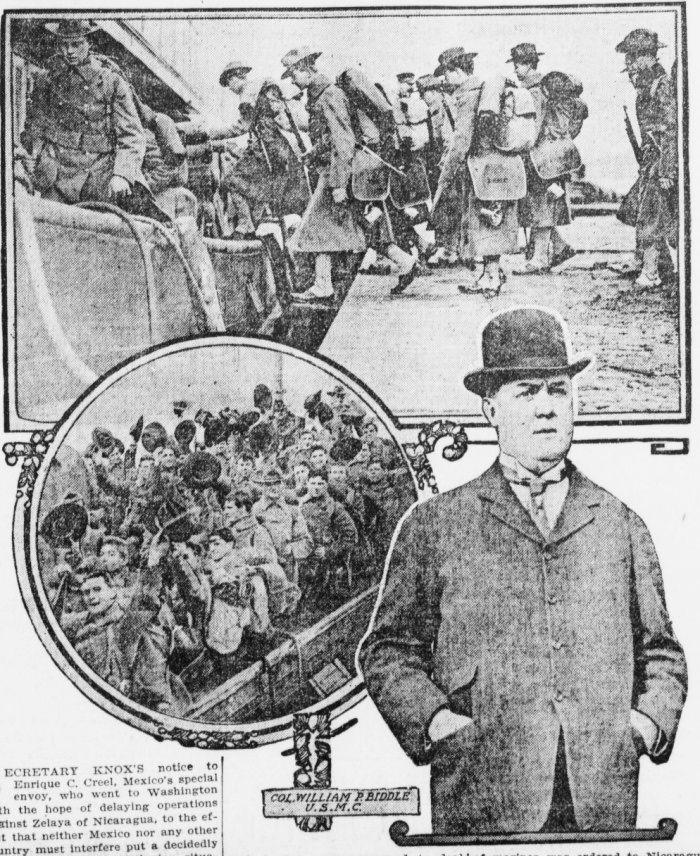
U.S. Marines leaving New York City in 1909 for deployment in Nicaragua with then-Colonel William P. Biddle, in charge of the detachment, is in civilian clothes at right

In 1909, the United States provided political support to conservative-led forces rebelling against President Zelaya. U.S. motives included differences over the proposed Nicaragua Canal, Nicaragua's potential as a destabilizing influence in the region, and Zelaya's attempts to regulate foreign access to Nicaraguan natural resources. On November 17, 1909, two Americans were executed by order of Zelaya after the two men confessed to having laid a mine in the San Juan River with the intention of blowing up the Diamante. The U.S. justified the intervention by claiming to protect U.S. lives and property. Zelaya resigned later that year.

In August 1912, the President of Nicaragua, Adolfo Díaz, requested the resignation of the Secretary of War, General Luis Mena. Concerned that Díaz was leading an insurrection, Mena fled Managua with his brother, the Chief of Police of Managua, and the insurrection escalated. When the U.S. Legation asked President Adolfo Díaz to ensure the safety of American citizens and property during the insurrection, Díaz replied that he could not and that...

In consequence my Government desires that the Government of the United States guarantee with its forces security for the property of American Citizens in Nicaragua and that it extend its protection to all the inhabitants of the Republic.

United States Marines were stationed in Nicaragua from 1912 to 1933, except for a nine-month period beginning in 1925. From 1910 to 1926, the conservative party ruled Nicaragua. The Chamorro family, which had long dominated the party, effectively controlled the government during that period. In 1914, the Bryan–Chamorro Treaty was signed, giving the U.S. control over the proposed canal, as well as leases for potential canal defenses.

=== Nicaraguan Civil War (1926–1927) ===
Following the evacuation of U.S. immigrants in 1925, another violent conflict between liberals and conservatives known as the Constitutionalist War took place in 1926, when Liberal soldiers in the Caribbean port of Puerto Cabezas revolted against Conservative President Adolfo Díaz, recently installed as a result of United States pressure following a coup. The leader of this revolt, Gen. José María Moncada, declared that he supported the claim of exiled Liberal vice-president Juan Bautista Sacasa, who arrived in Puerto Cabezas in December, declaring himself president of a "constitutional" government. The U.S., using the threat of military intervention, forced the Liberal generals to agree to a cease-fire.

On May 4, 1927, representatives from the two warring factions signed the Pact of Espino Negro, negotiated by Henry Stimson, appointed by U.S. President Calvin Coolidge as a special envoy to Nicaragua. Under the terms of the accord, both sides agreed to disarm, Díaz would be allowed to finish his term and a new national army would be established, the Guardia Nacional (National Guard), with U.S. soldiers remaining in the country to supervise the upcoming November presidential election. Later, a battalion of the U.S. army under the command of Gen. Logan Feland arrived to enforce the agreement.

=== 1927–1933 ===
The only Nicaraguan general to refuse to sign this pact (el tratado del Espino Negro) was Augusto César Sandino. He took refuge in the northern mountains of Las Segovias. He led a sustained guerrilla war, first against the Conservative regime and subsequently against the U.S. Marines, who withdrew upon the establishment of a new Liberal government. When the Americans left in 1933 as a result of Sandino's guerrilla war and the Great Depression, they set up the National Guard, a combined military and police force trained and equipped by the Americans, designed to be loyal to U.S. interests. Anastasio Somoza García, a close friend of the American government, was put in charge. He was one of the three rulers of the country, the others being Sandino and the mostly figurehead President Juan Bautista Sacasa.

Sandino and the newly elected Sacasa government reached an agreement by which he would cease his guerrilla activities in return for amnesty, a grant of land for an agricultural colony, and retention of an armed band of 100 men for a year.

The Nicaraguan Campaign Medal, a decoration of the United States Navy, was later issued for those American service members who had performed military duty in Nicaragua during the early years of the 20th century.

There followed a growing hostility between Sandino and Anastasio Somoza Garcia, chief of the national guard, which prompted Somoza to order the assassination of Sandino. Fearing future armed opposition from Sandino, Somoza invited him to a meeting in Managua, where Sandino was assassinated on February 21 of 1934 by the National Guard. Following the death of Sandino was the execution of hundreds of men, women, and children.

== Somoza dynasty (1936–1979) ==
=== Anastasio Somoza García's rule ===
With Sandino's death and using his troops, the National Guard, to force Sacasa to resign, Somoza had taken control of the country in 1937 and destroyed any potential armed resistance. The Somoza family would rule until 1979.

The earliest opposition to Somoza came from the educated middle class and the normally conservative wealthy, such as Pedro Joaquín Chamorro. On September 21, 1956, a Nicaraguan poet, Rigoberto López Pérez, snuck into a party attended by the President and shot him in the chest. In his memoirs Nicaragua Betrayed, Anastasio Debayle (Somoza's son) claims that Chamorro had knowledge of the assassination plot. While the assassin quickly died in a hail of gunfire, Somoza himself died a few days later, in an American hospital in the Panama Canal Zone.

=== Somoza's rise to power and the formation of a dictatorship ===
Divisions within the Conservative Party in the 1932 elections paved the way for the Liberal Juan Bautista Sacasa to assume power. This initiated an inherently weak presidency—hardly a formidable obstacle to Somoza as he set about building his personal influence over Congress and over the ruling Liberal Party. President Sacasa's popularity decreased as a result of his poor leadership and accusations of fraud in the 1934 congressional elections. Somoza García benefited from Sacasa's diminishing power, and at the same time brought together the National Guard and the Liberal Party (Partido Liberal – PL) in order to win the presidential elections in 1936. Somoza Garcia also cultivated support from former presidents Moncada and Chamorro while consolidating control within the Liberal Party.

Early in 1936, Somoza openly confronted President Sacasa by using military force to displace local government officials loyal to the president and replacing them with close associates. Somoza García's increasing military confrontation led to Sacasa's resignation on June 6, 1936. The Congress appointed Carlos Brenes Jarquín, a Somoza García associate, as interim president and postponed presidential elections until December. In November, Somoza resigned as chief director of the National Guard, thus complying with constitutional requirements for eligibility to run for the presidency. The Liberal Nationalist Party (Partido Liberal Nacionalista – PLN) was established with support from a faction of the Conservative Party to support Somoza Garcia's candidacy. Somoza was elected president in the December election with a reported margin of 64,000 of the 80,663 votes cast. On January 1, 1937, he resumed control of the National Guard, combining the roles of president and chief director of the military.

After Somoza's win in the December 1936 presidential elections, he proceeded to consolidate his power within the National Guard, while at the same time dividing his political opponents. Somoza family-members and close associates took up key positions within the government and the military. The Somoza family also controlled the PLN, which in turn controlled the legislature and judicial system, thus giving Somoza absolute power over every sphere of Nicaraguan politics. Nominal political opposition was allowed as long as it did not threaten the ruling élite. Somoza Garcia's National Guard repressed serious political opposition and anti-government demonstrations. The institutional power of the National Guard grew in most government-owned enterprises, until eventually the Guard controlled the national radio and telegraph networks, the postal and immigration services, health services, the internal revenue service, and the national railroads.

In less than two years after his election, Somoza Garcia, defying the Conservative Party, declared his intention to stay in power beyond his presidential term. Thus, in 1938, Somoza Garcia named a Constituent Assembly that gave the president extensive power and elected him for another eight-year term. A Constituent Assembly, extension of the presidential term from four years to six years, and clauses empowering the president to decree laws relating to the National Guard without consulting Congress, ensured Somoza's absolute control over the state and the military. Control over electoral and legislative machinery provided the basis for a permanent dictatorship.

In 1941, during World War II, Nicaragua declared war on Germany. Somoza sent no troops to the battlefronts, but used the crisis to seize attractive properties held by German-Nicaraguans, the best known of which was the Montelimar estate. (Today it operates as a privately owned luxury resort and casino.) Nicaragua became the first country to ratify the UN Charter.

=== Younger Somozas ===
Somoza García was succeeded by his two sons. Luis Somoza Debayle became President (29 September 1956 to 1 May 1963), and was effectively dictator of the country until his death, but his brother Anastasio Somoza Debayle held great power as head of the National Guard. A graduate of West Point, Anastasio was even closer to the Americans than his father and was said to speak better English than Spanish. Luis Somoza, remembered by some for being moderate, was in power for only a few years before dying of a heart attack.

The revolutionaries opposing the Somozas were greatly strengthened by the Cuban Revolution. The revolution provided both hope and inspiration to the insurgents, as well as weapons and funding. Operating from Costa Rica they formed the Frente Sandinista de Liberacion Nacional (FSLN) and came to be known as Sandinistas. They took their name from the still legendary Augusto César Sandino. With aid from the United States, the Somoza brothers succeeded in defeating the guerrillas.

Then came president, René Schick, whom most Nicaraguans viewed "as nothing more than a puppet of the Somozas". President Luis Somoza Debayle, under pressure from the rebels, announced that national elections would be held in February 1963. Election reforms had been made that established secret ballots and a supervising electoral commission, although the Conservative Party never elected any members of the commission. Somoza had also introduced a constitutional amendment that would prevent family members from succeeding him. The opposition was extremely skeptical of Somoza's promises, and ultimately control of the country passed to Anastasio Somoza Debayle.

In 1961, a young student, Carlos Fonseca, evoked the historical figure of Sandino, and founded the Sandinista National Liberation Front (FSLN). The FSLN was a tiny party throughout most of the 1960s, but Somoza's hatred of it, and his repressive treatment of anyone suspected as a Sandinista sympathizer, gave many ordinary Nicaraguans the idea that the Sandinistas were much stronger than was the case.

Somoza acquired monopolies in industries that were key to rebuilding the nation, not allowing other members of the upper class to share the profits that would result from the reborn economic activity. This ultimately weakened Somoza since even the economic elite were reluctant to support him. In the 1950s a synthetic brand of cotton, one of Nicaragua's economic pillars of the epoch, was developed. This caused the price of cotton to decrease, placing the economy in great trouble.

Landless peasants worked on large plantations during short harvest seasons and received wages as low as US$1 per day. In desperation, many of these poor laborers migrated east, seeking their own land near the rain forest. In 1968, the World Health Organization found that polluted water led to 17% of all Nicaraguan deaths.

=== American economic involvement ===
From 1945 to 1960, the U.S.-owned Nicaraguan Long Leaf Pine Company (NIPCO) directly paid the Somoza family millions of dollars in exchange for favorable benefits to the company, such as not having to re-forest clear cut areas. By 1961, NIPCO had cut all of the commercially viable coastal pines in northeast Nicaragua. Expansion of cotton plantations in the 1950s and cattle ranches in the 1960s forced peasant families from the areas they had farmed for decades. Some were forced by the National Guard to relocate into colonization projects in the rainforest.

Some moved eastward into the hills, where they cleared forests in order to plant crops. Soil erosion forced them, however, to abandon their land and move deeper into the rainforest. Cattle ranchers then claimed the abandoned land. Peasants and ranchers continued this movement deep into the rain forest. By the early 1970s, Nicaragua had become the United States' top beef supplier. The beef supported fast-food chains and pet food production. President Anastasio Somoza Debayle owned the largest slaughterhouse in Nicaragua, as well as six meat-packing plants in Miami.

Also in the 1950s and 1960s, 40% of all U.S. pesticide exports went to Central America. Nicaragua and its neighbors widely used compounds banned in the U.S., such as DDT, endrin, dieldrin and lindane. In 1977 a study revealed that mothers living in León had 45 times more DDT in their breast milk than the World Health Organization safe level.

== Sandinista insurrection (1972–1979) ==
A major turning point was the December 1972 Managua earthquake that killed over 10,000 people and left 500,000 homeless. A great deal of international relief was sent to the nation. Some Nicaraguan historians point to the earthquake that devastated Managua as the final 'nail in the coffin' for Somoza; some 90% of the city was destroyed. Somoza's brazen corruption, mishandling of relief (which prompted Pittsburgh Pirates star Roberto Clemente to fly to Managua on December 31, 1972, to try to help - a flight that ended in his death) and refusal to rebuild Managua, flooded the ranks of the Sandinistas with young disaffected Nicaraguans who no longer had anything to lose. The Sandinistas received some support from Cuba and the Soviet Union.

On 27 December 1974, a group of nine FSLN guerrillas invaded a party at the home of a former Minister of Agriculture, killing him and three guards in the process of taking several leading government officials and prominent businessmen hostage. In return for the hostages they succeeded in getting the government to pay US$2 million ransom, broadcast an FSLN declaration on the radio and in the opposition newspaper La Prensa, release fourteen FSLN members from jail, and fly the raiders and the released FSLN members to Cuba. Archbishop Miguel Obando y Bravo acted as an intermediary during the negotiations.

The incident humiliated the government and greatly enhanced the prestige of the FSLN. Somoza, in his memoirs, refers to this action as the beginning of a sharp escalation in terms of Sandinista attacks and government reprisals. Martial law was declared in 1975, and the National Guard began to raze villages in the jungle suspected of supporting the rebels. Human rights groups condemned the actions, but U.S. President Gerald Ford refused to break the U.S. alliance with Somoza.

The country tipped into full-scale civil war with the 1978 murder of Pedro Chamorro, who had opposed violence against the regime. 50,000 people turned out for his funeral. It was assumed by many that Somoza had ordered his assassination; suspected plotters included the dictator's son, “El Chiguin”, Somoza's President of National Congress of Nicaragua, Cornelio Hueck, Somoza's Attorney General, and Pedro Ramos, a close Cuban ally who commercialized illegal blood plasma. A nationwide strike, including labour and private businesses, commenced in protest, demanding an end to the dictatorship. At the same time, the Sandinistas stepped up their rate of guerrilla activity. Several towns, assisted by Sandinista guerrillas, expelled their National Guard units. Somoza responded with increasing violence and repression. When León became the first city in Nicaragua to fall to the Sandinistas, he responded with aerial bombardment, famously ordering the air force to "bomb everything that moves until it stops moving."

The U.S. media grew increasingly unfavorable in its reporting on the situation in Nicaragua. Realizing that the Somoza dictatorship was unsustainable, the Carter administration attempted to force him to leave Nicaragua. Somoza refused and sought to maintain his power through the National Guard. At that point, the U.S. ambassador sent a cable to the White House saying it would be "ill-advised" to call off the bombing, because such an action would help the Sandinistas gain power. When ABC reporter Bill Stewart was executed by the National Guard, and graphic film of the killing was broadcast on American TV, the American public became more hostile to Somoza. In the end, President Carter refused Somoza further U.S. military aid, believing that the repressive nature of the government had led to popular support for the Sandinista uprising.

In May 1979, another general strike was called, and the FSLN launched a major push to take control of the country. By mid July they had Somoza and the National Guard isolated in Managua.

== Sandinista period (1979–1990) ==
As Nicaragua's government collapsed and the National Guard commanders escaped with Somoza, the U.S. first promised and then denied them exile in Miami. The rebels advanced on the capital victoriously. On July 19, 1979, a new government was proclaimed under a provisional junta headed by 33-year-old Daniel Ortega, and included Violeta Chamorro, Pedro's widow. Somoza eventually ended up in Paraguay, where he was assassinated in September 1980, allegedly by members of the 'Argentinian Revolutionary Workers' Party.

The United Nations estimated material damage from the revolutionary war to be US$480 million. The FSLN took over a nation plagued by malnutrition, disease, and pesticide contaminations. Lake Managua was considered dead because of decades of pesticide runoff, toxic chemical pollution from lakeside factories, and untreated sewage. Soil erosion and dust storms were also a problem in Nicaragua at the time due to deforestation. To tackle these crises, the FSLN created the Nicaraguan Institute of Natural Resources and the Environment.

The key large-scale programs of the Sandinistas included a National Literacy Crusade from March to August 1980. Nicaragua received international recognition for gains in literacy, health care, education, childcare, unions, and land reform.

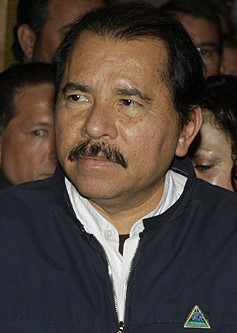
Daniel Ortega remained as president in the 1980s, going on to become one of the longest leaders in the Americas.

Managua became the second capital in the hemisphere after Cuba to host an embassy from North Korea. Due to tensions between their Soviet sponsors and China, the Sandinistas allowed Taiwan to retain its mission and refused to allow a Chinese mission in the country.

The Sandinistas won the national election of November 4, 1984, gathering 67% of the vote. The election was certified as "free and fair" by the majority of international observers. The Nicaraguan political opposition and the Reagan administration claimed political restrictions were placed on the opposition by the government. The primary opposition candidate was the U.S.-backed Arturo Cruz, who succumbed to pressure from the United States government not to take part in the 1984 elections; later US officials were quoted as saying, "the (Reagan) Administration never contemplated letting Cruz stay in the race, because then the Sandinistas could justifiably claim that the elections were legitimate." Three right-wing opposition parties (Coordinadora Democrática Nicaragüense) boycotted the election, claiming that the Sandinistas were manipulating the media and that the elections might not be fair. Other opposition parties such as the Conservative Democratic Party and the Independent Liberal party, were both free to denounce the Sandinista government and participate in the elections. Ortega was victorious, but the long years of war had decimated Nicaragua's economy.

Historian Christopher Andrew claimed that it was later discovered that the FSLN had, in fact, been suppressing right-wing opposition parties while leaving moderate parties alone, with Ortega claiming that the moderates "presented no danger and served as a convenient facade to the outside world". In 1993, the Library of Congress wrote "Foreign observers generally reported that the election was fair. Opposition groups, however, said that the FSLN domination of government organs, mass organizations groups, and much of the media created a climate of intimidation that precluded a truly open election.".

=== Communist leanings and U.S. backed Contras ===
American support for the long rule of the Somoza family had soured relations, and the FSLN government was committed to a Marxist ideology, with many of the leading Sandinista continuing long-standing relationships with the Soviet Union and Cuba. United States President Jimmy Carter, who had cut off aid to Somoza's Nicaragua the previous year, initially hoped that continued American aid to the new government would keep the Sandinistas from forming a doctrinaire Marxist–Leninist government aligned with the Soviet bloc, but the Carter administration aid was minimal, and the Sandinistas turned to Cuban and Eastern European assistance to build a new army of 75,000, including T-55 tanks, heavy artillery and HIND attack helicopters, that made the Sandinista Army more powerful than its neighbors. The Soviets also pledged to provide MiG 21 fighters, but the aircraft were never delivered.

With the election of Ronald Reagan in 1980, relations between the United States and the Sandinista regime became an active front in the Cold War. The Reagan administration insisted on the "Communist threat" posed by the Sandinistas—reacting particularly to the support provided to the Sandinistas by Cuba and the Soviets. The US suspended aid due to evidence of Sandinista support to FMLN rebels in El Salvador. Prior to U.S. aid withdrawal, FSLN politician Bayardo Arce, stated that "Nicaragua is the only country building its socialism with the dollars of imperialism." The Reagan administration responded by imposing economic sanctions and a trade embargo against Nicaragua in 1981, which would not be lifted until 1990.

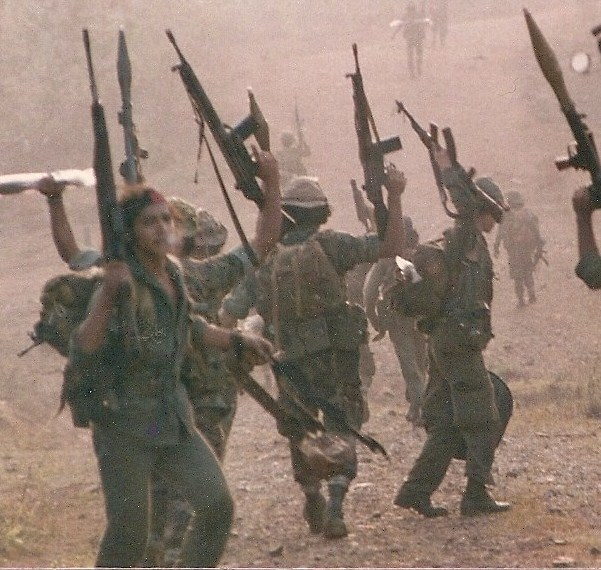
The Contras in 1987

After a brief period of sanctions, Nicaragua was faced with a collapsing economy. The U.S. trained and financed the Contras, a counter-revolutionary group, based in neighbouring Honduras to militarily oppose the Sandinista government. President Reagan called the Contras "the moral equivalent of our founding fathers." The Contras, groups of Somoza's National Guard who had fled to Honduras, were organized, trained and funded by CIA. The Contra chain of command included some ex-National Guardsmen, including Contra founder and commander Enrique Bermúdez and others, including ex-Sandinista hero Edén Pastora, who rejected the Leninist orientation of the Sandinistas. The Contras operated out of camps in the neighbouring Honduras to the north and Costa Rica to the south. They engaged in a systematic campaign of terror amongst the rural Nicaraguan population to disrupt social reform projects of the Sandinistas.

The US support for the Contras sparked widespread criticism from many quarters around the globe including within Nicaragua and the U.S., Democrats in Congress included. Several historians have criticized the contra campaign and the Reagan Administration's support for it, citing the brutality and numerous human rights violations of the Contras. LaRamee and Polakoff, for example, describe the destruction of health centers, schools and cooperatives at the hands of the rebels. Others have contended that large scale murder, rape and torture also occurred in Contra-dominated areas. The US also sought to place economic pressure on the Sandinistas, and the Reagan administration imposed a full trade embargo.

The Sandinistas were also accused of human rights abuses including torture, disappearances and mass executions. The Inter-American Commission on Human Rights investigated abuses by Sandinista forces, including an execution of 35 to 40 Miskitos in December 1981, and an execution of 75 people in November 1984.

American pressure against the government escalated throughout 1983 and 1984; the Contras began a campaign of economic sabotage and disrupted shipping by planting underwater mines in Nicaragua's Port of Corinto, an action later condemned by the International Court of Justice as illegal.

Daniel Ortega was elected president in 1984. The years of war and Nicaragua's economic situation had taken an unparalleled toll on Nicaragua. The US Government offered a political amnesty program that gave visas to any Nicaraguan without question. Nicaraguans (particularly wealthy on or those who had familial connections within the US) left the country in the largest emigration in Nicaraguan history. On May 1, 1985, Reagan issued an executive order that imposed a full economic embargo on Nicaragua, which remained in force until March 1990.

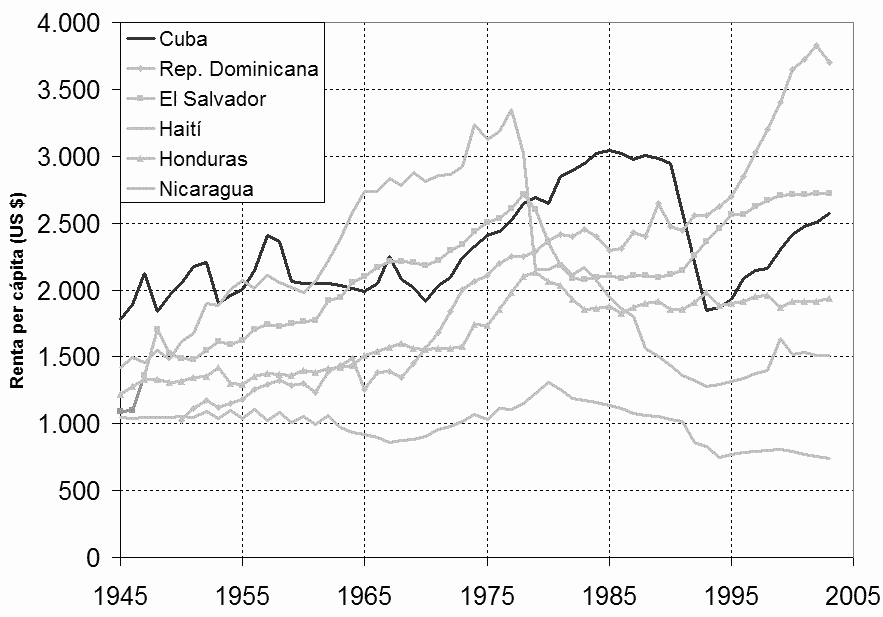
Comparative GDP per capita. Nicaragua experienced a large fall in growth in the late 1980s.

Nicaragua won a historic case against the U.S. at the International Court of Justice in 1986 (see Nicaragua v. United States), and the U.S. was ordered to pay Nicaragua $12 billion in reparations for violating Nicaraguan sovereignty by engaging in attacks against it. The United States withdrew its acceptance of the Court arguing it had no authority in matters of sovereign state relations. The United Nations General Assembly passed a resolution to pressure the U.S. to pay. Only Israel and El Salvador, which was backed in its own guerrilla insurgency, voted with the U.S.. Jeane Kirkpatrick, the American ambassador to the UN, criticized the Court as a "semi-judicial" body. In addition, the U.S. noted that Cuba and the Soviet Union had earlier committed the same violations against Nicaraguan sovereignty by providing training and ammunition to the Sandinistas against the Somoza regime.

The International Court of Justice decision called the nature of the conflict in Nicaragua as one of aggression directed by a foreign power against Nicaragua. In a twelve to three vote, the Court's summary judgment against the United States stated that by:

...training, arming, equipping, financing and supplying the contra forces or otherwise encouraging, supporting and aiding military and paramilitary activities in and against Nicaragua, the United States has acted, against the Republic of Nicaragua, in breach of its obligation under customary international law not to intervene in the affairs of another State.

In 1982, legislation was enacted by US Congress to prohibit further aid to the Contras. Reagan's officials attempted to illegally supply them out of the proceeds of arms sales to Iran and third party donations, triggering the Iran–Contra Affair of 1986–87. Mutual exhaustion, Sandinista fears of Contra unity and military success, and mediation by other regional governments led to the Sapoa ceasefire between the Sandinistas and the Contras on March 23, 1988. Subsequent agreements were designed to reintegrate the Contras and their supporters into Nicaraguan society in preparation for general elections

== Sixteen years of center-right rule (1990–2006) ==
The FSLN lost to the National Opposition Union by 14 points in elections on February 25, 1990. ABC news had been predicting a 16-point Sandinista victory. At the beginning of Violeta Chamorro's nearly 7 years in office the Sandinistas still largely controlled the army, labor unions, and courts. Her government made moves towards consolidating democratic institutions, advancing national reconciliation, stabilizing the economy, privatizing state-owned enterprises. Due to the control and influence of the army by the Sandinistas, the period following this saw the United States again re-introducing sanctions to Nicaragua from 1992 to 1995. Demands from the United States on lifting the sanctions were as given: strengthen civil control over the Nicaraguan military and settle expropriation claims.

In February 1995, Sandinista Popular Army Cmdr. Gen. Humberto Ortega was replaced, in accordance with a new military code enacted in 1994 by Gen. Joaquín Cuadra, who espoused a policy of greater professionalism in the renamed Army of Nicaragua. A new police organization law, passed by the National Assembly and signed into law in August 1996, further codified both civilian control of the police and the professionalization of that law enforcement agency.

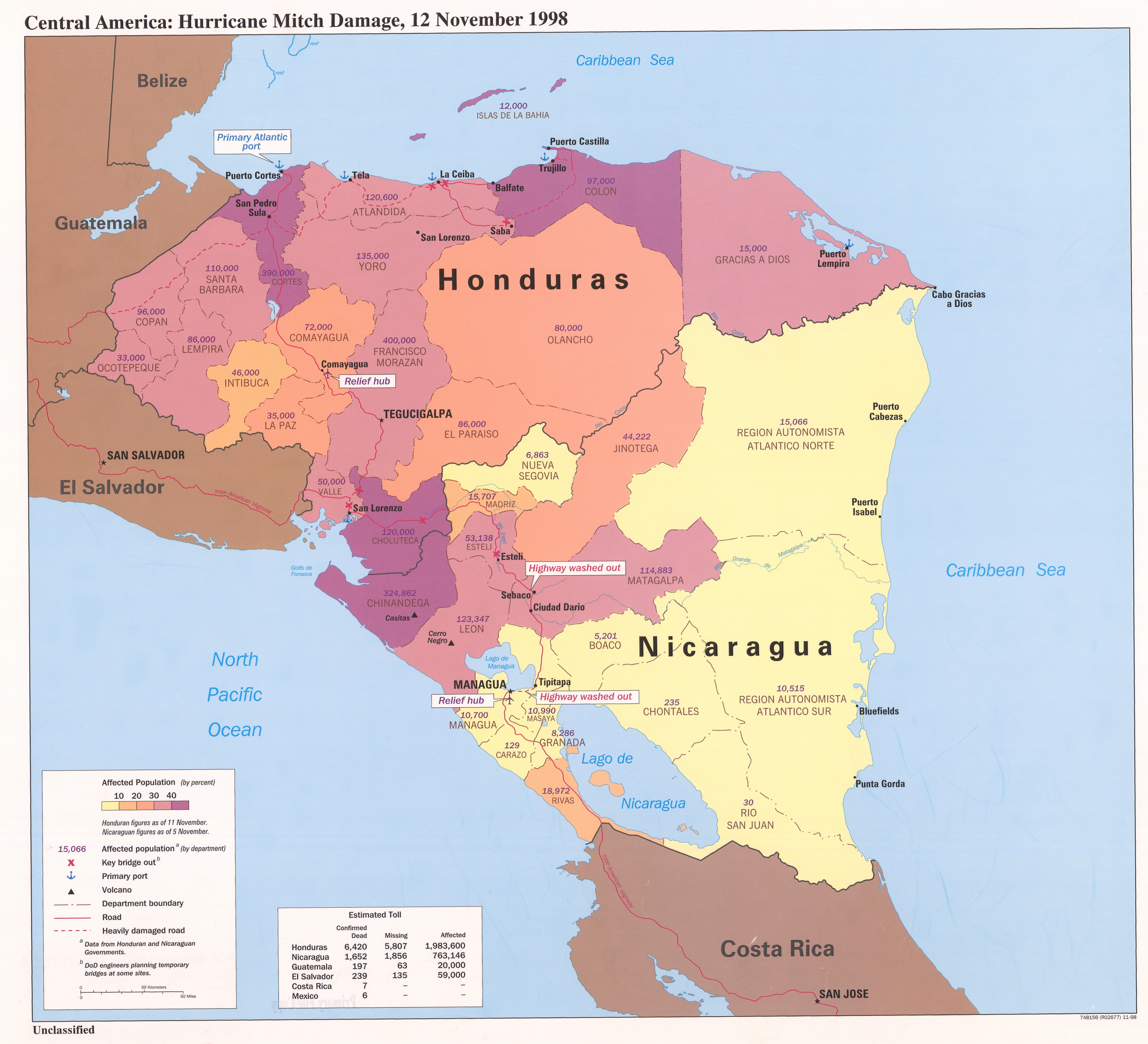
Affected regions in Nicaragua during Hurricane Mitch.

The October 20, 1996 presidential, legislative, and mayoral elections also were judged free and fair by international observers and by the groundbreaking national electoral observer group Ética y Transparencia (Ethics and Transparency) despite a number of irregularities, due largely to logistical difficulties and a baroquely complicated electoral law. This time Nicaraguans elected former-Managua Mayor Arnoldo Alemán, leader of the center-right Liberal Alliance, which later consolidated into the Constitutional Liberal Party (PLC). Alemán continued to privatize the economy and promote infrastructure projects such as highways, bridges, and wells, assisted in large part by foreign assistance received after Hurricane Mitch hit Nicaragua in October 1998. His administration was besieged by charges of corruption, resulting in the resignation of several key officials in mid-2000. Alemán himself was subsequently convicted of official corruption and sentenced to twenty years in jail.

In November 2000, Nicaragua held municipal elections. Alemán's PLC won a majority of the overall mayoral races. The FSLN fared considerably better in larger urban areas, winning a significant number of departmental capitals including Managua.

Presidential and legislative elections were held on November 4, 2001, the country's fourth free and fair election since 1990. Enrique Bolaños of the PLC was elected to the Nicaraguan presidency, defeating the FSLN candidate Daniel Ortega, by 14 percentage points. The elections were characterized by international observers as free, fair and peaceful. Bolaños was inaugurated on January 10, 2002.

In November 2006 the presidential election was won by Daniel Ortega, returned to power after 16 years in opposition. International observers, including the Carter Center, judged the election to be free and fair.

The country partly rebuilt its economy during the 1990s, but was hit hard by Hurricane Mitch at the end of October 1998, almost exactly a decade after the similarly destructive Hurricane Joan and again in 2007 it was hit by Hurricane Felix, a category 5 hurricane. Ten years later, Hurricane Nate also hit Nicaragua and destroyed much of the infrastructure in the countryside, such as communication masts.

== Ortega back in power (2006–present) ==
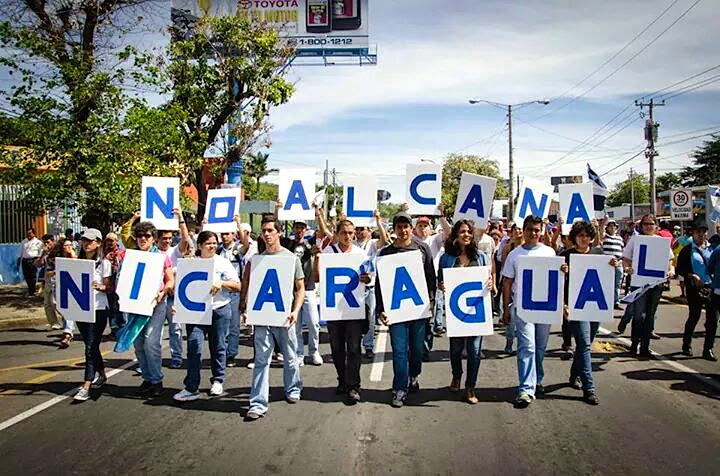
2014–18 Nicaraguan protests

In the Nicaraguan general election, 2006 Daniel Ortega gained some 38% of the vote in the single round, thus returning to power for his second term overall. The constitution at the time included a ban on immediate reelection of an incumbent president and on any one individual serving more than two terms as president. That notwithstanding, Ortega ran again and won the Nicaraguan general election, 2011 amid accusations of fraud by losing candidate Fabio Gadea Mantilla. Economic growth during most of those two terms was strong, and tourism in Nicaragua grew especially strongly, in part thanks to the perception of Nicaragua as a safe country to visit.

The Nicaraguan general election, 2016 saw a partial electoral boycott by the opposition and again accusations of electoral fraud as well, as accusations that the abstention rate was higher than the one officially published by the government. The Nicaraguan Canal was an issue of public debate and some controversy. Starting 19 April 2018, criticism of the Ortega government over the canal, forest fires in the Indio Maíz nature reserve, and a planned reform of the social security system led to the 2018–2022 Nicaraguan protests to which the government responded with violence and harsh repression.

On 20 July 2026, Daniel Ortega announced the abolition of the electoral system in order to prevent the opposition from taking power. He stated "There won't be any more elections here for them to try to seize the government and seize power" and "The days when parties backed by the Yankees and the Somocistas would return to power are over - never again." Nicaraguan lawmakers moved to carry out this plan.

== See also ==
- Politics of Nicaragua
- Protests against Daniel Ortega
- José Antonio Lacayo de Briones y Palacios
- List of presidents of Nicaragua
- Nicaragua v. United States (1986 International Court of Justice judgement)
- Timeline of Managua
- UNAPA (1994)

General:

- History of Central America
- List of years in Nicaragua
