= Isidoro del Carmen Mora Ortega =

Catholic Bishop of Siuna

The Most Reverend Isidoro del Carmen Mora Ortega
- Bishop of Siuna
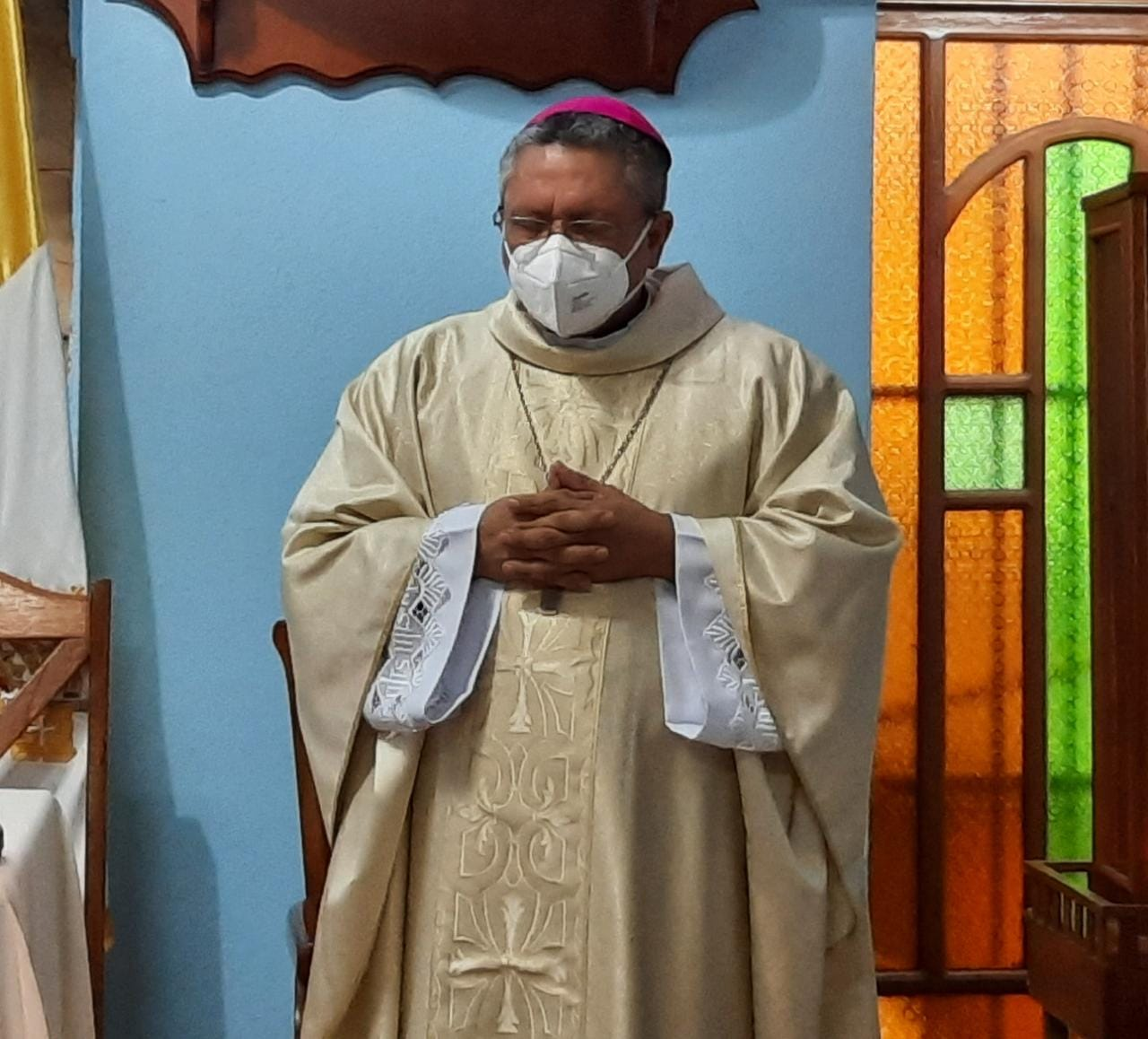
- Church: Roman Catholic Church
- Archdiocese: Managua
- Diocese: Siuna
- Appointed: 8 April 2021
- Predecessor: David Albin Zywiec Sidor
- Previous post: Vicar General of Matagalpa (2009–2021)

Orders
- Ordination: 20 September 2003
- Consecration: 26 June 2021 by Leopoldo Brenes

Personal details
- Born: 5 March 1970 (age 56) Matagalpa, Nicaragua
- Denomination: Roman Catholic
- Education: Major Seminary of Our Lady of Fátima in Managua

Isidoro del Carmen Mora Ortega (born 5 March 1970) is a Nicaraguan Roman Catholic prelate. He has been serving as the bishop of Siuna since 8 April 2021. He is an opponent of the Nicaraguan President Daniel Ortega. From December 2023 he was held under arrest. On 14 January 2024, Bishop Mora was exiled to Vatican City.

== Early years ==
Bishop Mora was born on 5 March 1970 in Matagalpa in the department of Matagalpa. He studied philosophy at the St Peter Apostle major seminary in Granada and theology at the Major Seminary of Our Lady of Fátima in Managua.

== Priesthood and pastoral work ==
Mora was ordained a priest for the Diocese of Matagalpa on 20 September 2003. Since then he held, among others, the following positions: parish vicar of St. Joseph in Matiguás and Our Lord of Esquipulas (2003–2004); parish administrator of St. Isidore and St. Dionysius in Matagalpa (2004–2006) and parish priest of St. John the Baptist in Muy Muy (2007–2008).

Since 2009 he has been parish priest of San Ramon Nonato and vicar general of his native Diocese of Matagalpa.

== Bishop ==
Fr. Mora was appointed as the second Bishop of Siuna by Pope Francis on 8 April 2021. and was consecrated a bishop on 26 June 2021 by Cardinal Leopoldo Brenes, archbishop of Managua, assisted by bishops Pablo Ervin Schmitz Simon and Rolando José Álvarez Lagos at the Cathedral of Our Lord of Esquipulas in Siuna.

=== Arrest by the Nicaraguan government and exile ===
On the night of 20 December 2023, Bishop Mora was arrested by the Nicaraguan government headed by president Daniel Ortega, one day after participating in a mass celebrating the 99th anniversary of the Diocese of Matagalpa, whose head, Bishop Rolando José Álvarez Lagos, was arrested after refusing to leave the country. On 14 January 2024, Ortega freed Mora, along with Álvarez, 15 priests, and two seminarians and exiled them to Vatican City.
