= Giru Marcelli =

City and bishopric in Roman North Africa

Giru Marcelli was a city and bishopric in Roman North Africa, which remains a Latin Catholic titular see.

== History ==
Giru Marcelli, located in present Algeria, was among the many town in the Roman province of Numidia which were important enough to become a suffragan diocese in the papal sway, but faded completely.

Its only historically documented bishop was Fructuosus, who participated in the synod called at Carthage by Hunerik of the Vandal Kingdom in 484, whereafter he was exiled, like most Catholic incumbents, unlike their Donatist heretic counterparts.

== Titular see ==
The diocese was nominally restored in 1933 as Titular bishopric of Giru Marcelli (Latin) / Giru di Marcello (Curiate Italian) / de Giru Marcelli (Latin adjective).

It has had the following incumbents, of the fitting Episcopal (lowest) rank, with an archiepiscopal exception:

- Titular Archbishop: Antoine Grauls, M. Afr. (1967.10.16 – 1986.07.26) as emeritate; previously Titular Bishop of Mades (1936.12.23 – 1959.11.10) as last Apostolic Vicar of Urundi (Burundi) (1936.12.23 – 1949.07.14) restyled only Apostolic Vicar of Kitega (1949.07.14 – 1959.11.10) and (see) promoted first Metropolitan Archbishop of Gitega (1959.11.10 – 1967.10.16)
- Mihály Mayer (1988.12.23 – 1989.11.03) as Auxiliary Bishop of the Diocese of Pécs (Hungary); next succeeded as Bishop of Pécs (1989.11.03 – retired 2011.01.19)
- Vital Massé (1993.10.20 – 2001.09.08) as Auxiliary Bishop of the Diocese of Saint-Jérôme (Canada) (1993.10.20 – 2001.09.08); later Bishop of Mont-Laurier (Canada) (2001.09.08 – retired 2012.02.02)
- David Albin Zywiec Sidor, O.F.M. Cap. (2002.06.24 – 2018.01.13) as Auxiliary Bishop of Apostolic Vicariate of Bluefields (Nicaragua).
- Robert Francis Christian, O.P. (2018.03.28 – 2019.07.11) as Auxiliary Bishop of the Archdiocese of San Francisco.
- Mykola Luchok, O.P. (since 2019.11.11) as Auxiliary Bishop of the Diocese of Mukachevo.

== See also ==
- List of Catholic dioceses in Algeria

== Sources and external links ==
- GCatholic

Bibliography

- Pius Bonifacius Gams, Series episcoporum Ecclesiae Catholicae, Leipzig 1931, p. 466
- Stefano Antonio Morcelli, Africa christiana, Volume I, Brescia 1816, pp. 172–173
- J. Mesnage, L'Afrique chrétienne, Paris 1912, pp. 415–416
