= Pablo Ervin Schmitz Simon =

American Capuchin friar

Pablo Ervin Schmitz Simon OFMCap
- Bishop Emeritus of Bluefields
- Church: Catholic Church
- Diocese: Diocese of Bluefields
- In office: July 28, 1994 – November 12, 2020
- Predecessor: Salvador Albert Schlaefer Berg
- Successor: Francisco José Tigerino Dávila
- Other post: Apostolic Administrator of Siuna (2020-2021)
- Previous posts: Titular Bishop of Elepla (1984-2017); Auxiliary Bishop of Bluefields (1984-1994)

Orders
- Ordination: September 3, 1970 by Leo Joseph Brust
- Consecration: September 17 1984 by Andrea Cordero Lanza di Montezemolo

Personal details
- Born: December 4, 1943 (age 82) Fond du Lac, Wisconsin, United States
- Coat of arms

Pablo Ervin Schmitz Simon OFMCap (born December 3, 1943) is an American Capuchin friar, who was bishop of Bluefields, Nicaragua, from 1994 to 2020.

== Biography ==
Born in Fond du Lac, Wisconsin, United States, on December 3, 1943, Schmitz was ordained to the priesthood on September 3, 1970, for the Capuchin order. On June 22, 1984, he was appointed titular bishop of Elepla and auxiliary bishop of the Roman Catholic Vicariate Apostolic of Bluefields, Nicaragua. He was ordained bishop on September 17, 1984.

On January 2, 1990, Schmitz was injured in an attack in Nicaragua by armed men identified as "contra" fighters that led to the deaths of two Roman Catholic nuns.

On July 28, 1994, he was appointed bishop of the Apostolic Vicariate of Bluefields. On 30 November 2017, the Apostolic Vicariate was promoted to a diocese and Schmitz was named its first diocesan bishop. He was installed there on 20 January 2018.

Pope Frances accepted his resignation on 12 November 2020.

On 9 January 2020, Pope Francis appointed him apostolic administrator of the Diocese of Siuna following the death of Bishop David Albin Zywiec Sidor. He held that post until the 26 June 2021.
