= Cathedral of the Holy Virgin Protection, Mariupol =

Coordinates: 47.097895°N 37.548404°E

Cathedral of the Holy Virgin Protection
- Cathedral of the Holy Virgin Protection, Mariupol
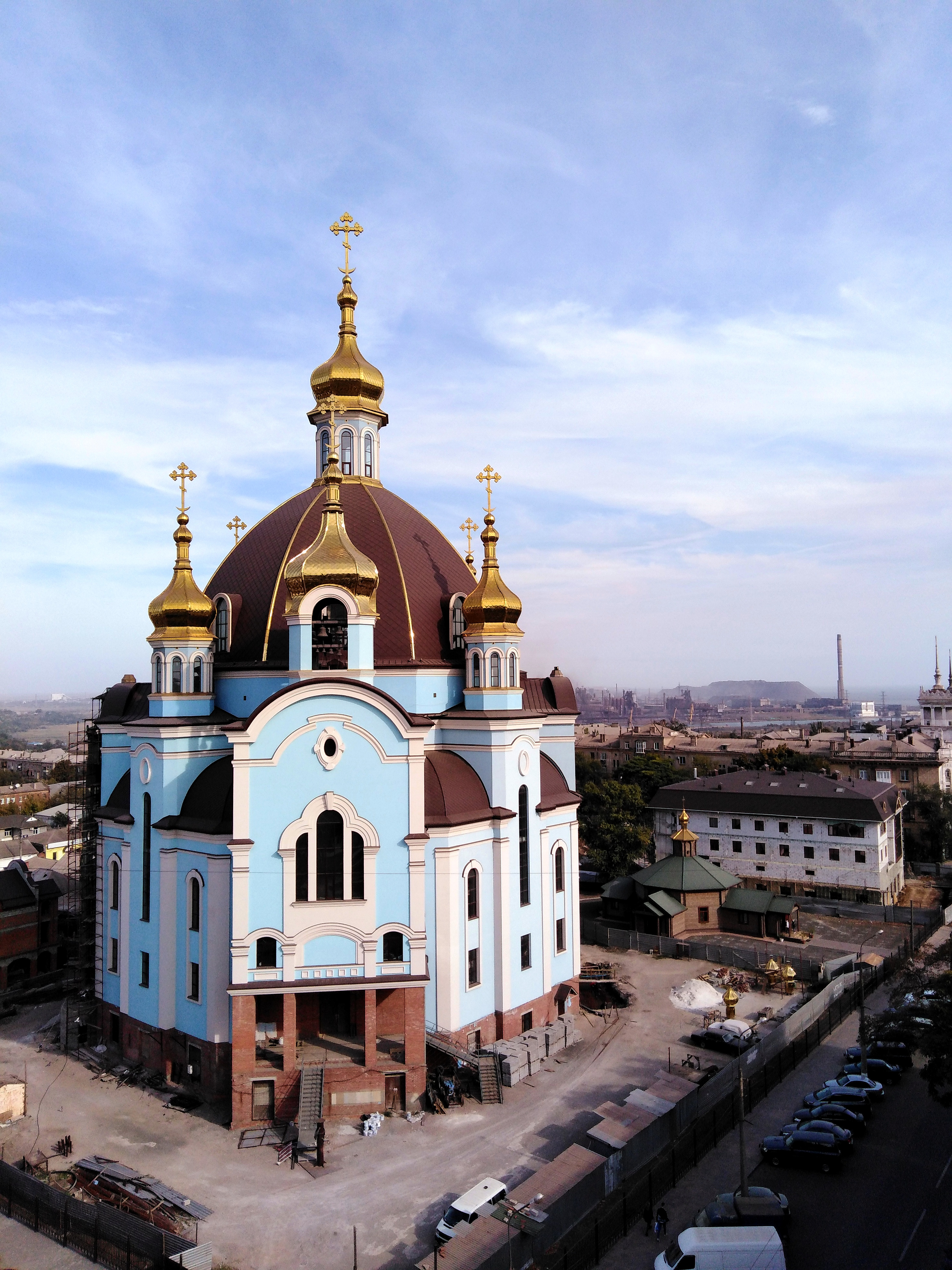
- Cathedral of the Holy Virgin Protection
- Cathedral of the Holy Virgin Protection
- Location: Mariupol
- Country: Ukraine

History
- Status: Church
- Dedication: Holy Virgin Protection

Architecture
- Years built: 2007
- Completed: 2020

Specifications
- Materials: Brick

The Cathedral of the Holy Virgin Protection (Ukrainian: Храм Покрови Пресвятої Божої Матері) is a Ukrainian Orthodox church located in Mariupol, Ukraine.

== History ==
The stone building was built between 2007 and 2020 and designed by architect Stanislaw Stolow (Russian: Станислав Столов). The bell tower of the church has ten bells. They were installed in 2012, the main bell weighs 4.2 tons, and the weight of the smallest bell is 18 kilograms. The largest cross weighs two tons, and the weight of the side cross is 730 kilograms. The height of the cathedral is 84.3 meters.

== See also ==
- List of cathedrals in Ukraine
