= Mykola Luchok =

Ukrainian prelate

Most Reverend Mykola Petro Luchok, O.P.
- Titular Bishop of Giru Marcelli, Auxiliary Bishop of Mukachevo
- Church: Roman Catholic Church
- Appointed: 11 November 2019
- Other post(s): Superior of the Dominican community in Lviv (2018–2019)

Orders
- Ordination: 24 June 2003 (Priest) by Antal Majnek
- Consecration: 10 December 2019 (Bishop) by Claudio Gugerotti

Personal details
- Born: Petro Oleksandrovych Luchok; 26 March 1974 (age 51); Mukachevo, Zakarpattia Oblast, Ukrainian SSR, Soviet Union

Bishop Mykola Petro Luchok, O.P. (Ukrainian: Микола Петро Лучок; Hungarian: Lucsok Péter Miklós; born 26 March 1974) is a Ukrainian prelate of the Latin Church of the Catholic Church and the Titular Bishop of Giru Marcelli and Auxiliary Bishop of Diocese of Mukachevo since 11 November 2019. Since 28 January 2022 he is also serving as Apostolic Administrator of the same Diocese.

== Life ==
Bishop Luchok was born in the family of Oleksandr Luchok in Zakarpattia Oblast. After graduation of the school education, joined the Dominican Order in 1994; he made a profession on August 29, 1995, and a solemn profession on April 30, 2000, and was ordained as priest on June 23, 2003, after completed studies at the Major Dominican Theological Seminary in Kraków, Poland and the Pontifical University of John Paul II in Kraków, Poland.

He returned to Ukraine in 2003 and began to work in the Dominican parishes and as superior of the different local Dominican communities, aspecially in Yalta, Saint Petersburg (Russian Federation), Chortkiv, Lviv and Khmelnytskyi. From 2018 until 2019 he again served as superior of the Dominican community in Lviv.

On November 11, 2019, he was appointed by Pope Francis as the first Auxiliary Bishop of the Diocese of Mukachevo, Ukraine and Titular Bishop of Giru Marcelli and consecrated in the Cathedral of St Martin of Tours in Mukachevo on December 10, 2019.

On Friday, January 28, 2022, Pope Francis accepted the resignation of Antal Mainek, Bishop of the Diocese of Mukachevo of the Roman Catholic Church in Ukraine. The pope appointed the Auxiliary Bishop of the Mukachevo Diocese, Mykola Luchko, O.P.

Catholic Church titles
Preceded by Robert Francis Christian	Titular Bishop of Giru Marcelli; 2019–	Succeeded by Incumbent
Preceded by Antal Majnek	Apostolic Administrator of Diocese of Mukachevo; 2022–present	Succeeded by Incumbent
