= Rolando José Álvarez Lagos =

Catholic Bishop of Matagalpa in Nicaragua (born 1966)

The Most Reverend Rolando Álvarez
- Bishop of Matagalpa
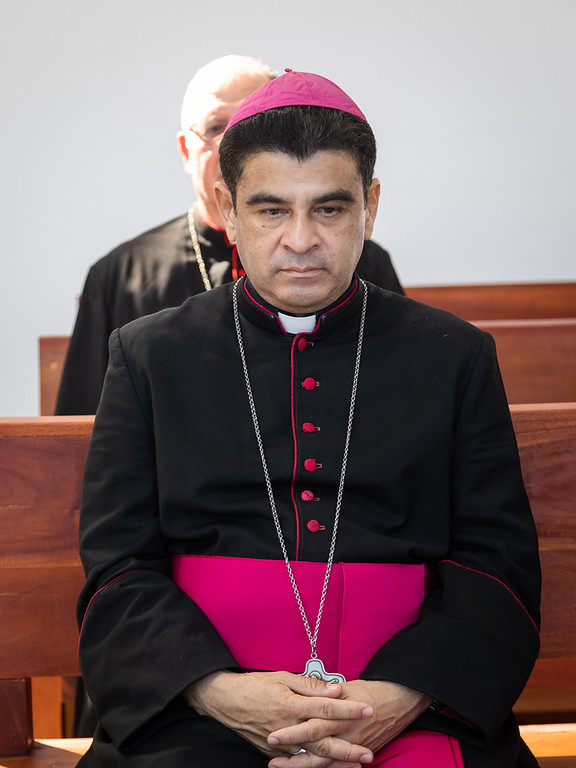
- Church: Roman Catholic Church
- Archdiocese: Managua
- Diocese: Matagalpa
- Appointed: 8 March 2011
- Predecessor: Jorge Solórzano Pérez
- Other post: Apostolic administrator of Estelí (since 2021)

Orders
- Ordination: 7 November 1994
- Consecration: 2 April 2011 by Leopoldo Brenes

Personal details
- Born: 27 November 1966 (age 59) Managua, Nicaragua
- Denomination: Roman Catholic
- Education: Pontifical Lateran University; Pontifical Gregorian University

Styles of Rolando José Álvarez Lagos
- Reference style: His Excellency
- Spoken style: Your Excellency
- Religious style: Bishop

Rolando José Álvarez Lagos (born 27 November 1966) is a Nicaraguan prelate of the Catholic Church. He has served as the bishop of Matagalpa since 2011 and apostolic administrator of Estelí since 2021. He is a longtime opponent of the Nicaraguan President Daniel Ortega. In February 2023, after being held under house arrest for six months, he refused to join a group of political prisoners released into U.S. custody and was sentenced for treason to 26 years in prison. He was exiled to Vatican City in January 2024.

== Early years ==
Álvarez was born on 27 November 1966 in Managua in the department of Managua. He began his education at the Instituto Didáctico Domingo Faustino Sarmiento there. He studied philosophy and theology at the major seminary in Guatemala City and then earned his bachelor's degree in theology at the Pontifical Lateran University and his licentiate in philosophy from the Pontifical Gregorian University. He completed further coursework in preparation for his ordination at the Congregation for the Clergy and earned a master's degree in the social doctrine of the Church at the University of Salamanca.

== Priesthood ==
Álvarez was ordained a priest of the Archdiocese of Managua on 7 December 1994. Since then he has worked as a professor and prefect at the seminary of that archdiocese (1994-2006), coordinator of the youth ministry of the archdiocese (since 1998), director of the Catholic radio station Radio Nicaragua (since 2001), secretary of the department for social communications of the Nicaraguan Bishops' Conference (since 2003), Secretary for Information and Spokesperson for the Archdiocese of Managua (since 2005), Coordinator of National Youth Pastoral Care (since 2006), Pastor of the parish of San Francisco de Asís in Managua from 2006 to 2011, and executive secretary of the Secretariat of the Bishops of Central America (SEDAC) from 2009 to 2011.

== Bishop ==
Álvarez was appointed Bishop of Matagalpa by Pope Benedict XVI on 8 March 2011. He was consecrated a bishop on 2 April by Leopoldo Brenes, archbishop of Managua, assisted by Jorge Solórzano Pérez and Henryk Józef Nowacki.

He took on the responsibility of apostolic administrator of the Diocese of Esteli in July 2022, following the retirement of Bishop Juan Abelardo Mata.

=== Conflict with the Nicaraguan government ===
Alvarez has been one of the most outspoken critics of the Ortega regime, and its crackdown on civil and religious liberties. In May 2022 he announced he was beginning a hunger strike to protest against police harassment. In a video statement he explained that he was being followed by police constantly, and that the fact this was now affecting his family had led him to take action. "At one point I asked the police why they were there, and they told me it was for my own safety. But we know that in this country insecurity comes precisely from the police, they were the ones making me feel unsafe. I will fast until such a time as the police, through the president or the vice-president of the Bishops’ Conference, and only them, inform me that they will begin to respect the privacy of my family’s circle".

On 4 August 2022, Álvarez was prevented by government agents from leaving his house to celebrate mass at St. Peter Cathedral, effectively placing him under house arrest. It is believed that government forces did this because he "frequently lambastes the violation of human rights, religious persecution and abuses of power" by the Ortega government. Álvarez's house arrest was confirmed on 19 August. Pope Francis expressed concern over restrictions on religious freedom in Nicaragua later that month.

In 13 December, Álvarez was charged with conspiracy "for undermining national integrity and propagation of false news through information and communication technologies to the detriment of the State and Nicaraguan society." He was ordered to remain under house arrest. On 8 February 2023, the Commission of the Bishops’ Conferences of the European Union called on the government to release Álvarez.

Álvarez was not among the 222 political prisoners the Nicaraguan government released to US custody on 9 February; Ortega said Álvarez had refused to board the flight to the United States. Álvarez had been scheduled to stand trial a week later, but on 10 February the government announced that Álvarez had been declared a traitor, stripped of his citizenship, and sentenced to 26 years in prison.

On 14 January 2024, Ortega freed Álvarez and expelled him from Nicaragua. Álvarez, along with Bishop Isidoro del Carmen Mora Ortega, 15 priests, and two seminarians were exiled to Vatican City.
