= List of Catholic dioceses in Nicaragua =

The Roman Catholic Church in Nicaragua comprises one ecclesiastical province headed by an archbishop. The province is in turn subdivided into 9 dioceses and 1 archdiocese each headed by a bishop or an archbishop.

== List of dioceses ==
=== Episcopal Conference of Nicaragua ===
==== Ecclesiastical province of Managua ====
- Archdiocese of Managua
  - Diocese of Bluefields
  - Diocese of Estelí
  - Diocese of Granada
  - Diocese of Jinotega
  - Diocese of Juigalpa
  - Diocese of León en Nicaragua
  - Diocese of Matagalpa
  - Diocese of Siuna
