= David Albin Zywiec Sidor =

American priest (1947–2020)

David Albin Zywiec Sidor OFM Cap
- Bishop of Siuna
- Church: Catholic Church
- Diocese: Diocese of Siuna
- In office: November 30, 2017 – January 5, 2020
- Predecessor: Diocese erected
- Successor: Isidoro del Carmen Mora Ortega
- Previous posts: Titular Bishop of Giru Marcelli (2002-2017); Auxiliary Bishop of Bluefields (2002-2017)

Orders
- Ordination: June 1, 1974 by Salvador Albert Schlaefer Berg
- Consecration: September 13, 2002 by Miguel Obando y Bravo

Personal details
- Born: July 15, 1947 East Chicago, Indiana, U.S.
- Died: January 5, 2020 (aged 72) Managua, Nicaragua
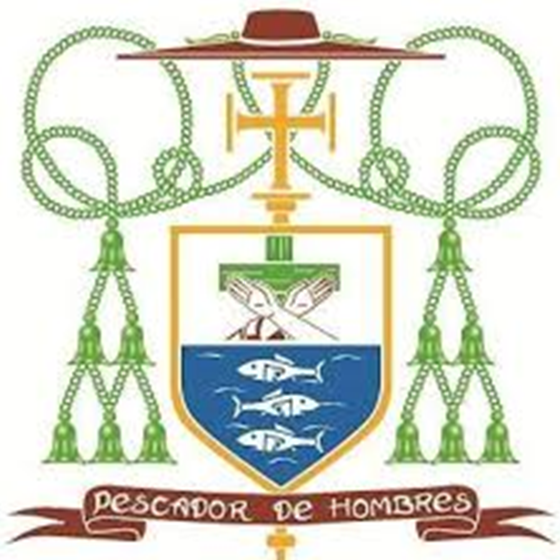
- Coat of arms: David Albin Zywiec Sidor's coat of arms

David Albin Zywiec Sidor, OFM Cap (July 15, 1947 – January 5, 2020) was an American-Nicaraguan Roman Catholic bishop.

Born in East Chicago, Indiana, Zywiec Sidor was ordained to the priesthood, for the Capuchin order, on June 1, 1974. On June 24, 2002, he was named titular bishop of Giri Marcelli and auxiliary bishop of the Roman Catholic Vicariate Apostolic of Bluefields, Nicaragua, and was ordained bishop on September 13, 2002. He then served as bishop of the Roman Catholic Diocese of Siuna, Nicaragua, from 2017 until his death in 2020.

On January 5, 2020, Zywiec died at the Military Hospital of Nicaragua, where he was treated for a brain tumor.
