= St. Martin of Tours Cathedral, Mukachevo =

Roman Catholic cathedral in Ukraine

St. Martin of Tours Cathedral
- Кафедральний собор св. Мартина з Туру
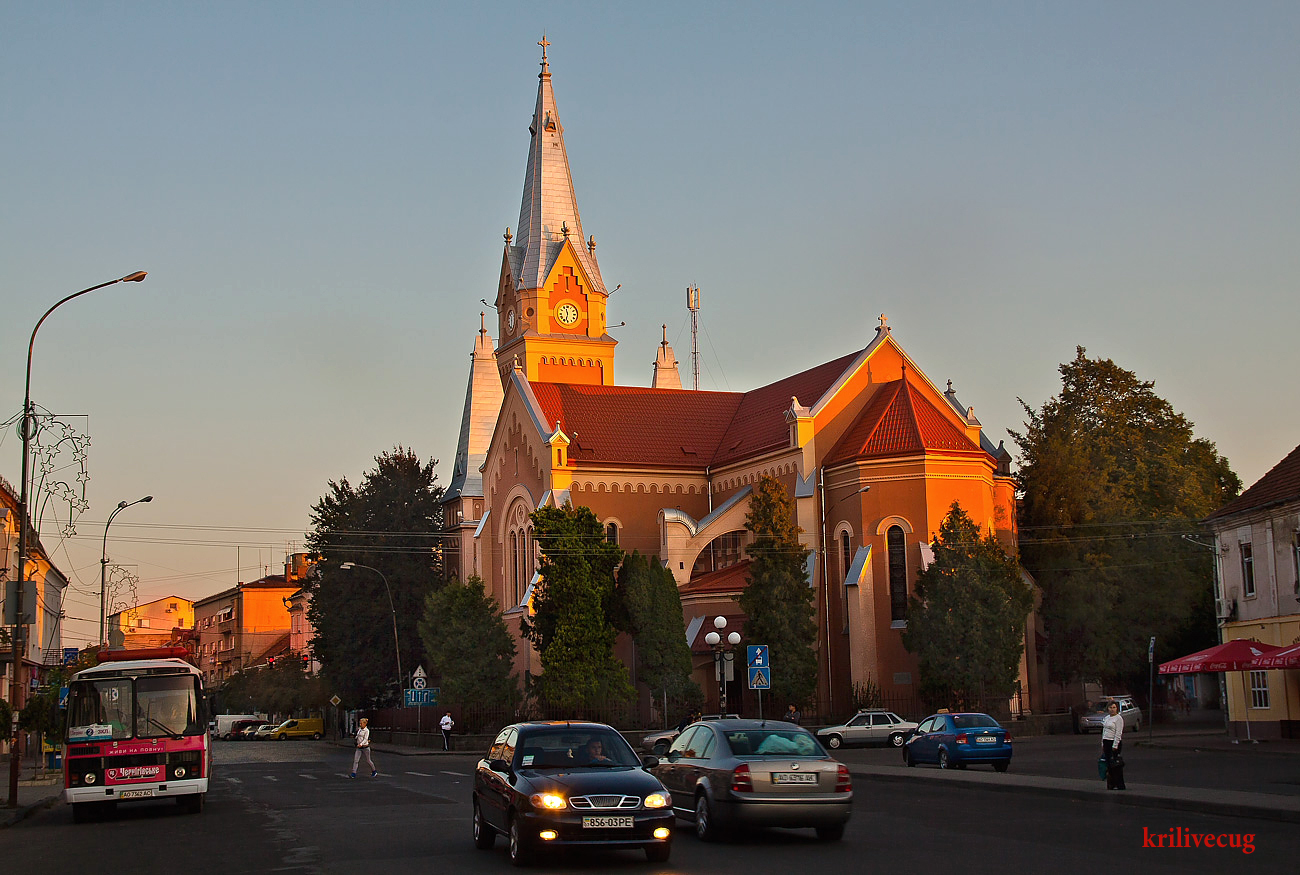
- St. Martin of Tours Cathedral
- 48.4403°N 22.7225°E
- Location: Mukachevo, Zakarpattia Oblast
- Country: Ukraine
- Denomination: Catholic

History
- Dedication: Martin of Tours
- Consecrated: 24 September 1905

Architecture
- Architect: Márton Wagner
- Style: Eclecticism

Administration
- Archdiocese: Lviv
- Diocese: Mukachevo

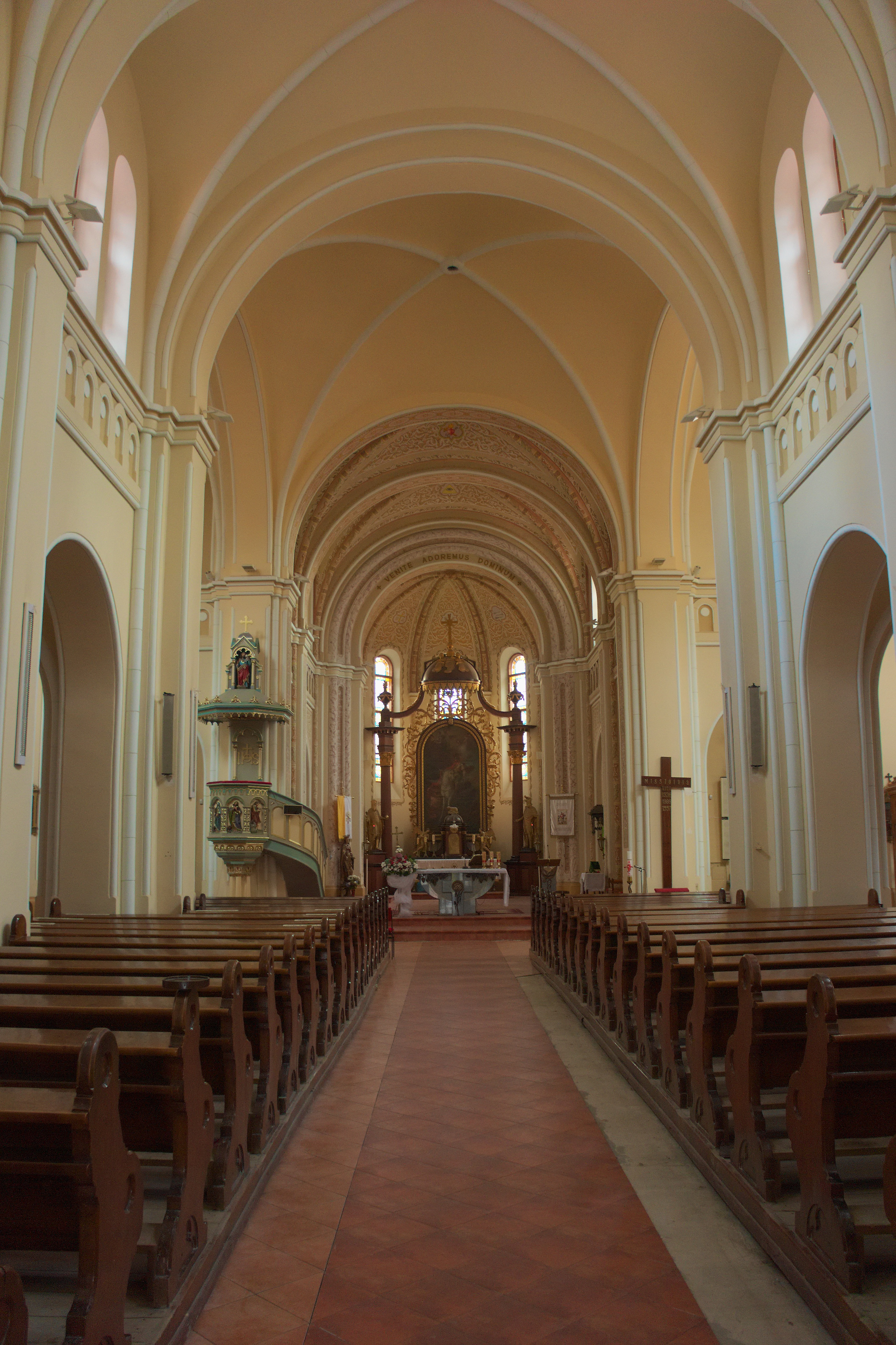
Internal view

The Cathedral of Saint Martin of Tours (Ukrainian: Кафедральний собор св. Мартина з Туру; Hungarian: Tours-i Szent Márton-székesegyház), also called the Mukachevo Cathedral in Mukachevo, Ukraine, is the cathedral church of the Diocese of Mukachevo of the Latins.

The church is decorated with a light brown tone. Its main and highest tower is adorned with a clock, and the entrance gate was decorated with a vaulted arch and columns. It has an adjoining chapel dedicated to Saint Joseph, which dates back to the 14th century. The church was built by Márton Wagner between 1904 and 1905 in an eclectic style. In Soviet times, it was closed by the authorities of the local communist party. In 1990, it was returned to the Catholic faithful. With the erection of the Catholic diocese of Mukachevo (Dioecesis Munkacsiensis Latinorum; Єпархія Мукачево) by bull Cum Transcarpatiae of Pope John Paul II, the church was designated as the diocesan cathedral.

== See also ==
- List of cathedrals in Ukraine
- Catholic Church in Ukraine
