= Matteo Aloisio Niedhammer y Yaeckle =

Matteo Aloisio Niedhammer y Yaeckle OFMCap
- Vicar Apostolic of Bluefields
- Church: Catholic Church
- See: Apostolic Vicariate of Bluefields
- In office: May 11, 1943 – June 25, 1970
- Predecessor: Juan Matías Solá y Farrell
- Successor: Salvador Albert Schlaefer Berg
- Other post: Titular Bishop of Caloe (1943-1970)

Orders
- Ordination: June 8, 1927 by Sebastian Gebhard Messmer
- Consecration: June 29, 1943 by James Edward Walsh

Personal details
- Born: September 11, 1901 New York City, New York, United States
- Died: June 25, 1970 (aged 68) Puerto Cabezas, Zelaya Department, Nicaragua

Matteo Aloisio Niedhammer y Yaeckle OFMCap (September 11, 1901 - June 25, 1970) was a Capuchin friar and a bishop of the Roman Catholic Church.

Born in New York City, New York, United States, Niedhammer y Yaeckle was ordained to the priesthood on June 8, 1927. On May 11, 1943, he was appointed titular bishop of Caloe and bishop of the Vicariate Apostolic of Bluefields, Nicaragua and was ordained bishop on June 29, 1943. He died in 1970 while still in office.
