= Cathedral of St. Michael the Archangel, Mariupol =

Saint Michael's Cathedral Mariupol Ukraine

Cathedral of St. Michael the Archangel (Mariupol)
- Собор Архистратига Михаїла в Маріуполі
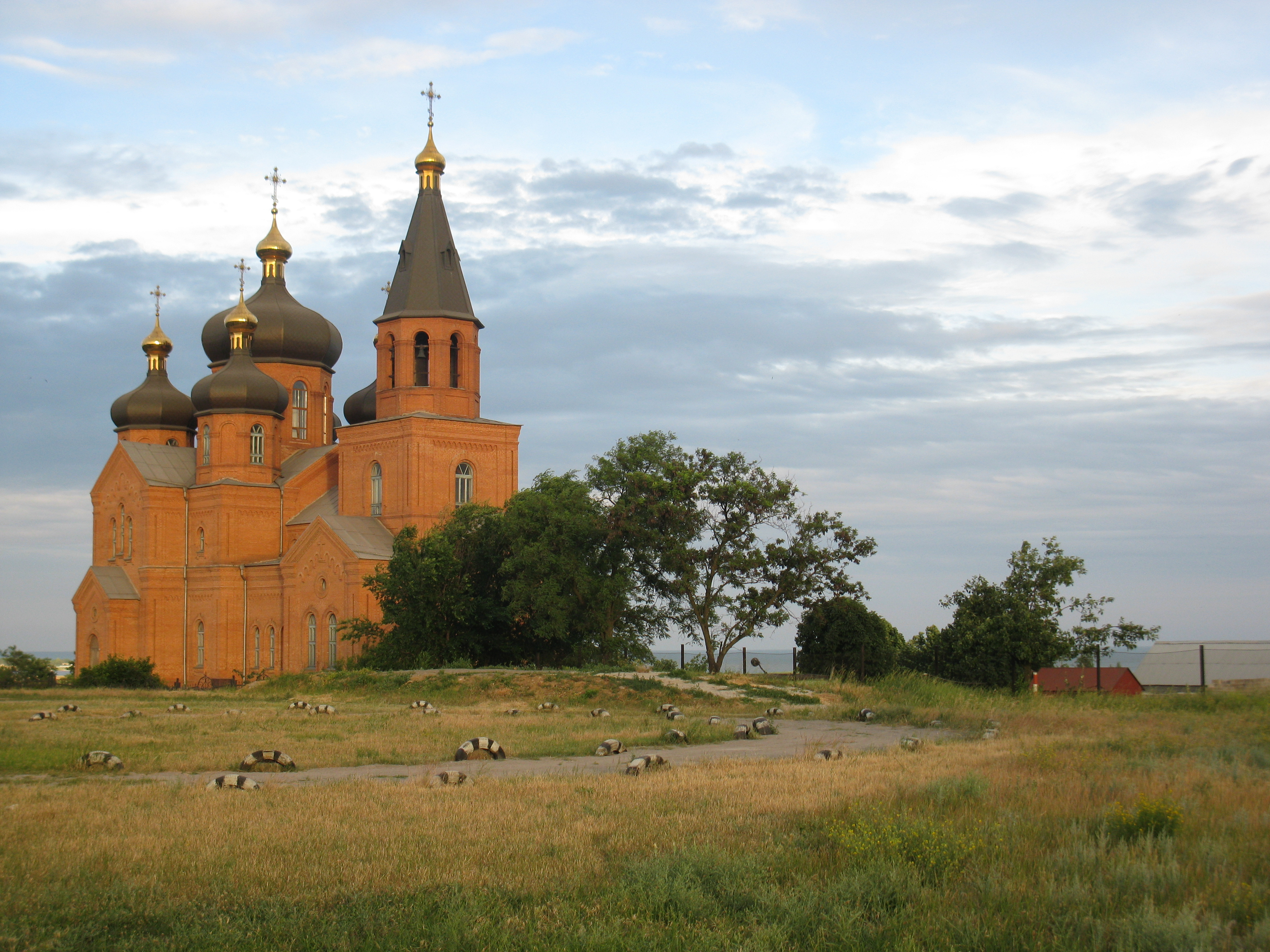
- Cathedral of St. Michael the Archangel
- Cathedral of St. Michael the Archangel (Mariupol)
- 47°05′47″N 37°39′36″E
- Location: Voiniv-Vyzvolyteliv St, 3, Mariupol', Donetsk Oblast, 87529
- Country: Ukraine
- Denomination: Ukrainian Orthodox (Moscow Patriarchate)
- Website: https://arhistratig.church.ua/

History
- Status: active
- Consecrated: 1997

Architecture
- Groundbreaking: 1995
- Completed: 1997

Administration
- Diocese: Donetsk Eparchy

Clergy
- Bishop(s): Shukalo Roman Vasilyevich, Metropolitan Hilarion of Donetsk and Mariupol

Cathedral of Saint Michael the Archangel (Ukrainian: Собор Архістратига Михаїла) is a Ukrainian Orthodox church located at the left bank of the river Kalmius, Mariupol, Ukraine.

== General information ==
The cathedral is a six-domed church, built between 1996 and 1998 and designed by the architects V. N. Konstantinow, L. N. Kuzminkow (Russian: В. Н. Константинов, Л. Н. Кузьминков).

The cathedral is a church, built of red brick over the course of two years and completed and consecrated in 1997. It can accommodate from 200 to 1,000 parishioners.

From the observation deck of the cathedral one has panoramic views of the Sea of Azov, coastal villages of the Left Bank, green villages and hills, in particular a hill called Slag Mountain, which arose as a result of the work of the Azovstal Iron and Steel Works.

The church is commonly known as "Pozhivanovska" in honor of the former mayor of Mariupol, Mikhail Pozhivanov, who was the initiator and patron of the project of constructing this church.

The church is home to icons and shrines, the main shrine being the copy of the icon of the Mother of God "Life-Giving Spring", created at the beginning of the 19th century. Other icons are of the Archangel Michael of God and St. Nicholas. There also are icons of saints, in which particles of their remains are embedded: St. Ignatius of Mariupol; St. Lazar the Four Days, Bishop of Kita; Hieromartyr Thaddeus, Archbishop of Tver; Saint Blessed Paul of Taganrog; Martyr Grand Duchess Elizabeth; Rev. Alexy, a man of God; Great Martyr John Sochavsky, and others.

During World War II, when temples were destroyed, the icons were kept by parishioners. After a period of persecution and unrest, the image of the Mother of God was restored and returned to the church.

An administrative building was also built on the grounds of the temple to house a Sunday school, a room for the baptism of children and a refectory for the needy.

A monument to Metropolitan Ignatius of Mariupol, the city's heavenly patron, stands next to the church. According to history, Metropolitan Ignatius of Gotfei and Kafai led the migration of Orthodox Greeks from the Crimea to the Azov Sea.

In 2022, during the Siege of Mariupol, the cathedral was heavily damaged.

== Gallery ==
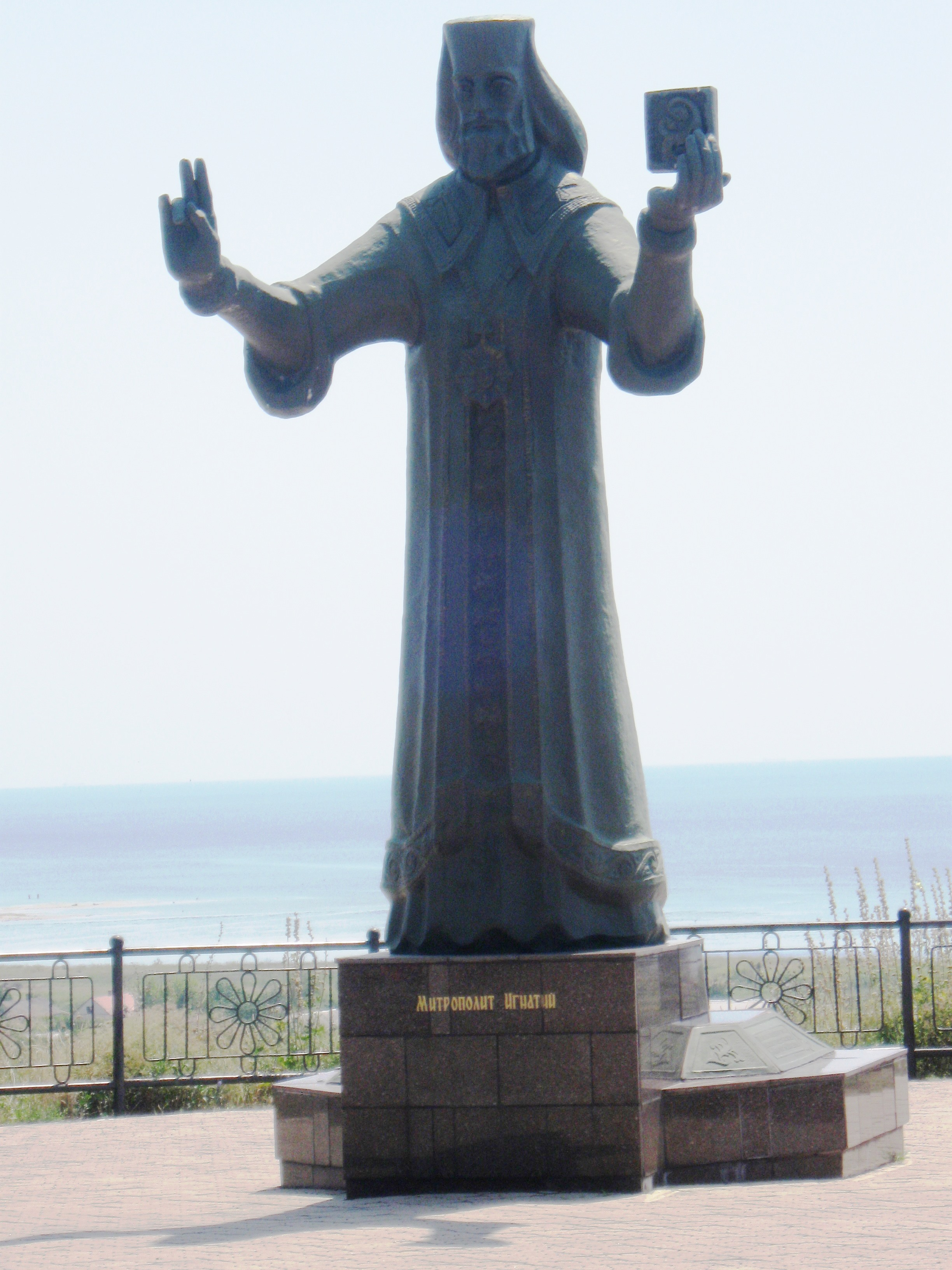
Monument to Metropolitan Ignatius - religious educator

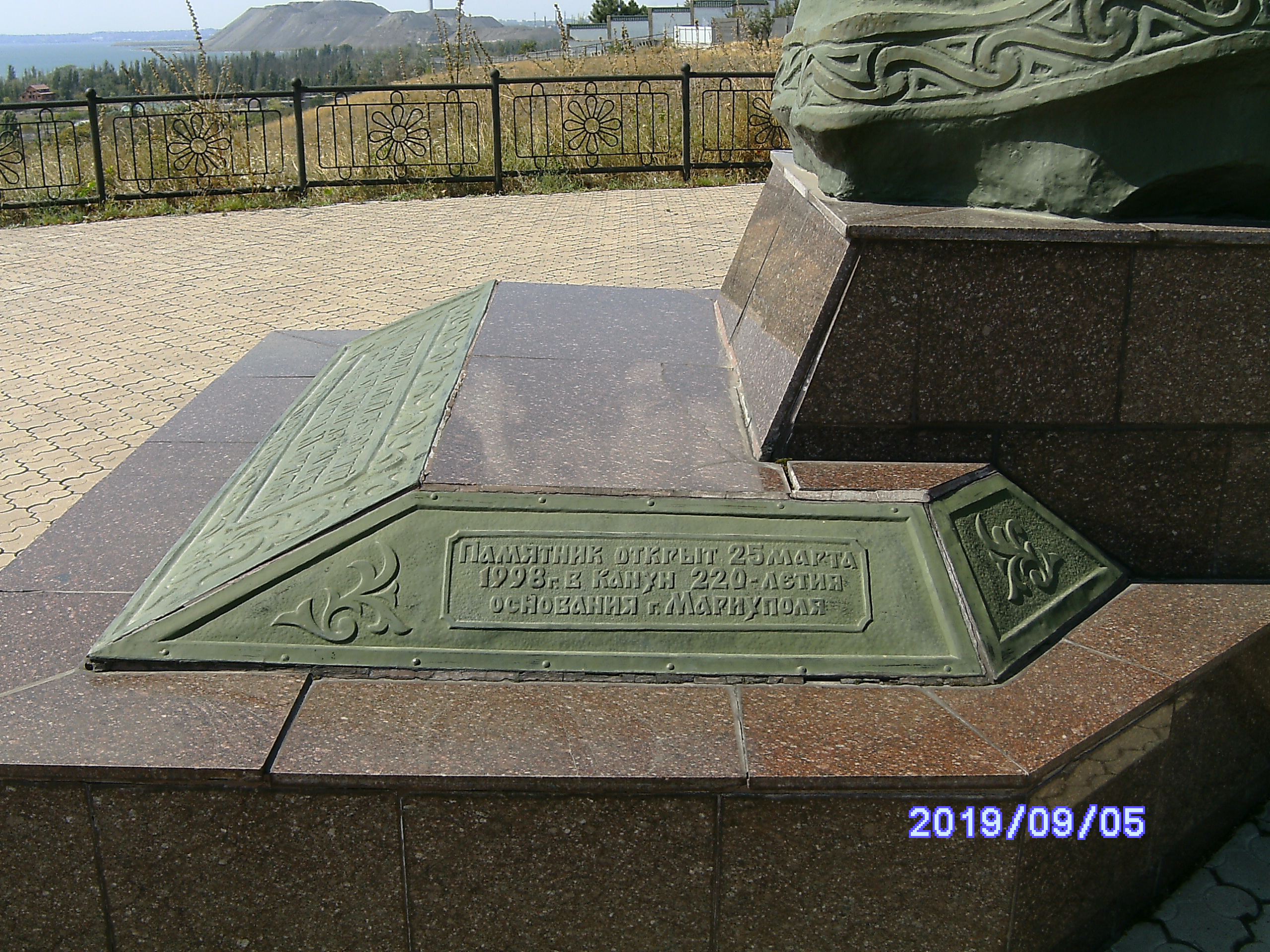
Foundation of the monument to Metropolitan Ignatius

== See also ==
- List of cathedrals in Ukraine
