= Antal Majnek =

Antal Majnek OFM
- Bishop Emeritus of Mukachevo
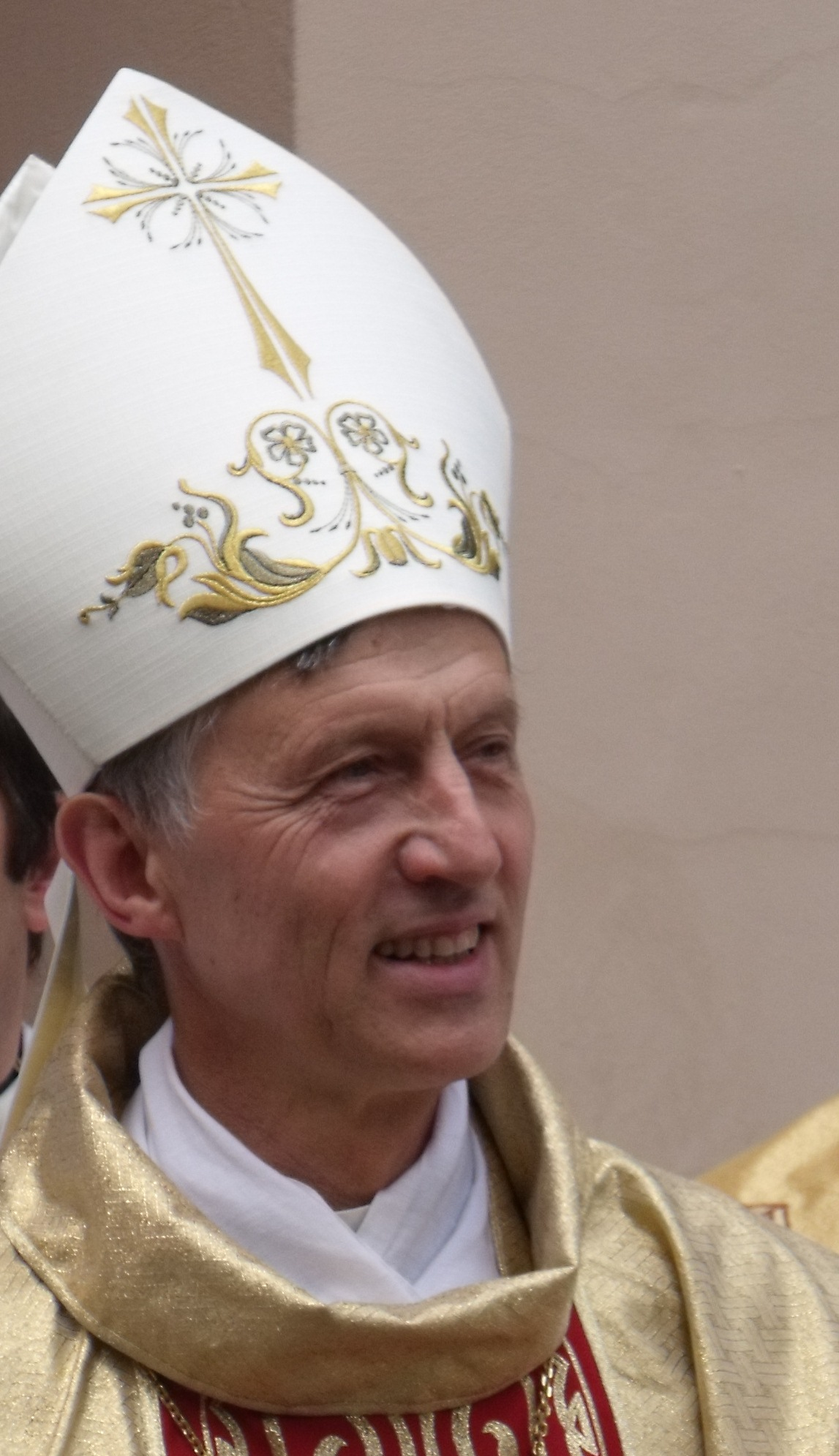
- Church: Catholic Church
- Diocese: Diocese of Mukachevo
- In office: 7 October 1997 – 28 January 2022
- Predecessor: Antonio Franco
- Successor: Mykola Luchok
- Previous posts: Titular Bishop of Febiana (1995-2002); Auxiliary Bishop of Zakarpattia (1995-1997)

Orders
- Ordination: 17 April 1982
- Consecration: 6 January 1996 by Pope John Paul II

Personal details
- Born: 18 November 1951 (age 74) Budapest, Hungarian People's Republic

Antal Majnek, OFM (18 November 1951 in Budapest) is the Roman Catholic bishop emeritus of the diocese of Mukachevo.

== Biography ==
In 1977 he joined the Franciscan Order in Hungary. On 17 April 1982 Majnek was ordained priest in Budapest. In 1989 he began missionary work in Ukraine.

== Episcopate ==
On 9 December 1995 he was appointed auxiliary bishop of Transcarpathia and to the titular see of Febiana. On 6 January 1996, Pope John Paul II ordained him bishop. Since 1997, he served as Apostolic Administrator of Transcarpathia. On 27 March 2002 he was appointed to the diocese of Mukachevo. On 28 January 2022, the Holy See announced that Pope Francis had accepted Majnek's resignation.
