= Salvador Albert Schlaefer Berg =

Salvador Albert Schlaefer Berg OFMCap
- Vicar Apostolic of Bluefields
- Church: Catholic Church
- See: Vicariate Apostolic of Bluefields
- In office: June 25, 1970 – October 22, 1993
- Predecessor: Matteo Aloisio Niedhammer y Yaeckle
- Successor: Pablo Ervin Schmitz Simon
- Other post: Titular Bishop of Flumenpiscense (1970-1993)

Orders
- Ordination: 5 June 1946 by John Patrick Treacy
- Consecration: 12 August 1970 by Lorenzo Antonetti

Personal details
- Born: July 27, 1920 Campbellsport, Wisconsin, United States
- Died: October 22, 1993 (aged 73)

Salvador Albert Schlaefer Berg OFMCap (July 27, 1920 – October 22, 1993) was a Capuchin friar and a bishop of the Roman Catholic Church.

Born in Campbellsport, Wisconsin, United States, Schlaefer Berg was ordained a priest for the Capuchin order on June 5, 1946. On July 25, 1970, he was appointed titular bishop of Flumenpiscene' and bishop of the Diocese of Bluefields, Nicaragua, on June 25, 1970, and was consecrated on August 12, 1970. He died while still in office.
