= Diocese of Siuna =

Roman Catholic diocese in Nicaragua

Diocese of Siuna Dioecesis Siunaënsis Diócesis de Siuna

Location
- Country: Nicaragua
- Ecclesiastical province: Province of Managua
- Metropolitan: Leopoldo José Brenes Solórzano

Statistics
- Area: 47,385 km^{2} (18,295 sq mi)
- Population: Total; Catholics: (as of 2022); 649,244; 295,081 (45.4%)
- Parishes: 18

Information
- Denomination: Roman Catholic
- Rite: Roman Rite
- Established: 30 November 2017 (8 years ago)
- Cathedral: Cathedral of Our Lady of Guadalupe, Siuna; Pro-cathedral of Our Lord of Esquipulas, Siuna

Current leadership
- Pope: Leo XIV
- Bishop: Isidoro del Carmen Mora Ortega

Map
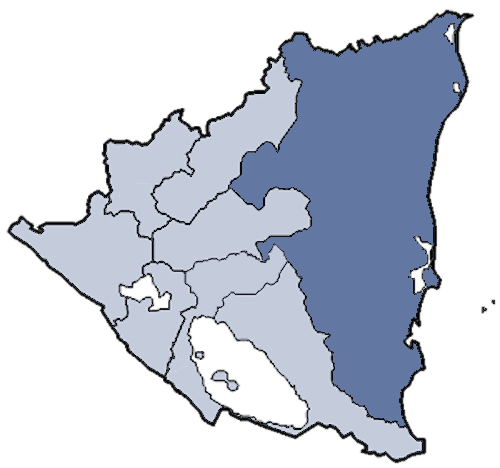

The Roman Catholic Diocese of Siuna (Latin: Dioecesis Siunaënsis) was established on 30 November 2017.

== History ==
- 30 November 2017: Established as Roman Catholic Diocese of Siuna, on territory split off from the Vicariate Apostolic of Bluefields.

== Ordinaries ==
- David Albin Zywiec Sidor O.F.M. Cap. (2017–2020)
- Isidoro del Carmen Mora Ortega (2021–)

== See also ==
- Roman Catholic dioceses of Nicaragua

== External links and references ==
- "Diocese of Siuna". Catholic-Hierarchy.

Specific
