= Diocese of Bluefields =

Latin Catholic ecclesiastical jurisdiction in Nicaragua

Diocese of Bluefields Dioecesis Bluefieldensis
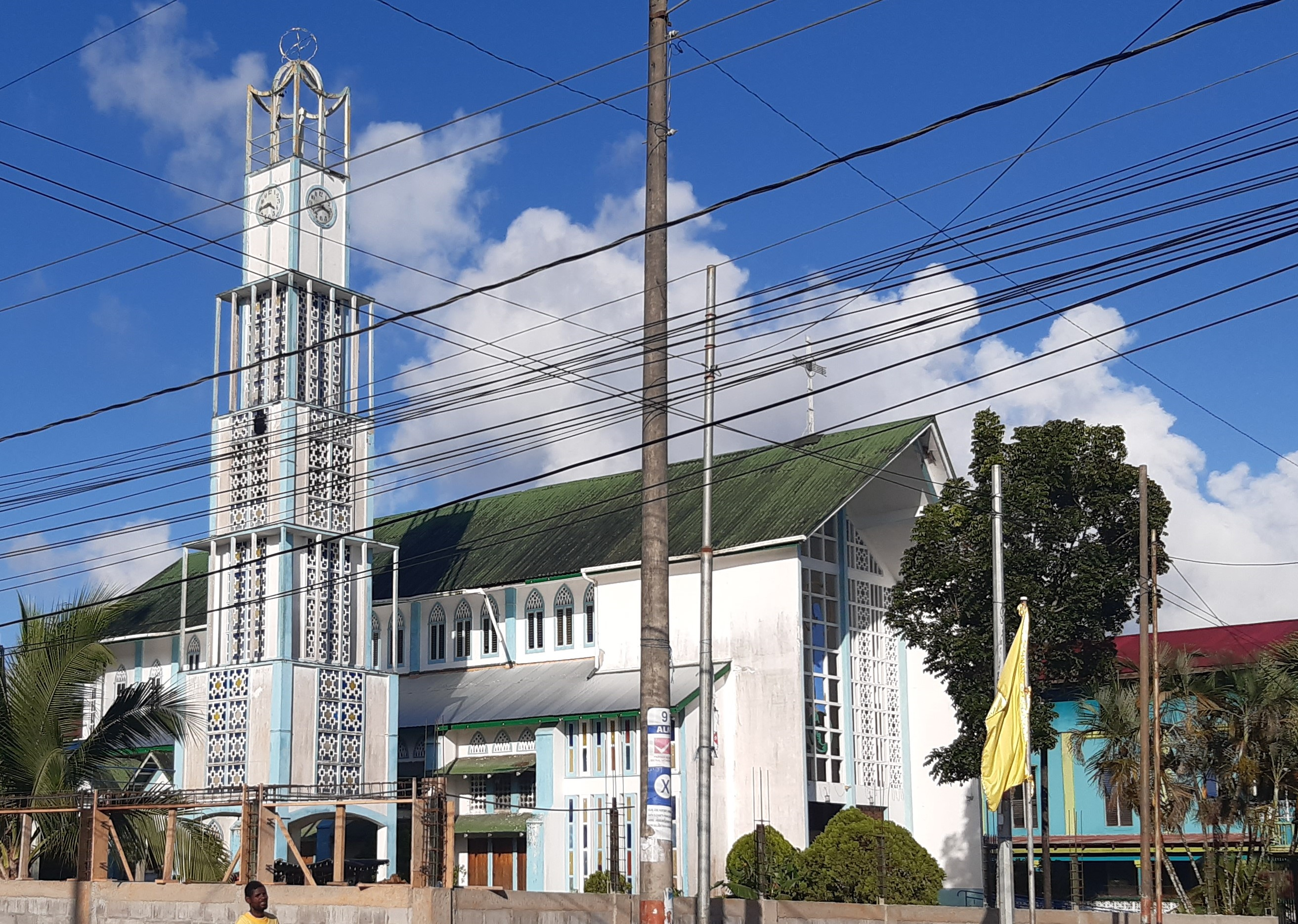
- Cathedral of Our Lady of the Rosary in Bluefields in 2023

Location
- Country: Nicaragua
- Ecclesiastical province: Province of Managua
- Metropolitan: Leopoldo José Brenes Solórzano

Statistics
- Area: 19,965 km^{2} (7,709 sq mi)
- Population: Total; Catholics: (as of 2022); 1,124,800; 663,500 (59%)
- Parishes: 14

Information
- Denomination: Catholic Church
- Sui iuris church: Latin Church
- Rite: Roman Rite
- Established: 2 December 1913 (112 years ago)
- Cathedral: Cathedral of Our Lady of the Rosary

Current leadership
- Pope: Leo XIV
- Diocesan Bishop: Francisco José Tigerino Dávila
- Bishops emeritus: Pablo Ervin Schmitz Simon, OFMCap

Map
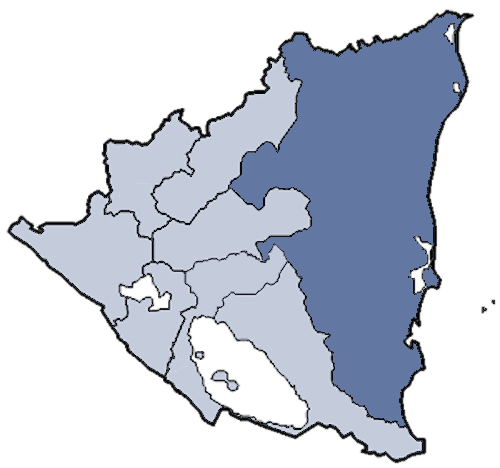

The Diocese of Bluefields (Latin: Dioecesis Bluefieldensis) is a Latin Church ecclesiastical jurisdiction or diocese of the Catholic Church in Nicaragua. The Vicariate Apostolic of Bluefields had been erected on December 2, 1913 and had grown to approximately 587,000 Catholics by 2017. On November 30, 2017 the Vicariate Apostolic of Bluefields was elevated to a diocese and a second diocese (the Diocese of Siuna) was created, taking approximately 60% of the Catholics that had formerly been in the Vicariate Apostolic of Bluefields. The current bishop is Francisco José Tigerino Dávila.

== History ==
- February 12, 1913: Established as Vicariate Apostolic of Bluefields, on territory split off from the Diocese of León in Nicaragua
- November 30, 2017: Lost territory to establish the Diocese of Siuna
- November 30, 2017: Elevated as to the status of diocese

== Ordinaries ==
- Agustín José Bernaus y Serra, OFMCap (1913–1930)
- Juan Solá y Farrell, OFMCap (1931–1942)
- Matteo Aloisio Niedhammer y Yaeckle, OFMCap (1943–1970)
- Salvador Albert Schlaefer Berg, OFMCap (1970–1993)
- Pablo Ervin Schmitz Simon, OFMCap (1994–2020)
- Francisco José Tigerino Dávila (2020– )

== Auxiliary bishops ==
- Pablo Ervin Schmitz Simon, OFMCap (1984-1994), appointed Vicar Apostolic here
- David Albin Zywiec Sidor, OFMCap (2002–2017)

== See also ==
- Roman Catholic dioceses of Nicaragua
