= List of cathedrals in Ukraine =

List of cathedrals in Ukraine and cathedral temples that includes temples that used to have cathedra.

Since 1992 there has been a movement to organize a separate Ukrainian Orthodox Church independently of the Russian church. In 2018, that church became the Orthodox Church of Ukraine recognized by the Ecumenical Patriarchate of Constantinople and now led by Epiphanius of Kyiv. This church is unrecognized by the Russian Orthodox Church.

All of the Russian Orthodox Church temples in Ukraine are organized as the Ukrainian Orthodox Church (Moscow Patriarchate).

In addition, a smaller independent church exists led by Filaret, the Ukrainian Orthodox Church – Kyiv Patriarchate

For disambiguation purposes the church recognized by Constantinople is identified as Orthodox Church of Ukraine (OCU), the Russian Orthodox Church is identified as the Ukrainian Orthodox Church (Moscow Patriarchate) (UOC-MP) and the church led by Filaret as the Ukrainian Orthodox Church (Kyiv Patriarchate) (UOC-Kyiv).

The Russian Orthodox Church continues to possess the highest number of dioceses and major temples in Ukraine. Many of the dioceses were created after the fall of the Soviet Union in 2000s and later. After the 2022 Russian invasion of Ukraine ownership of several sites has become disputed.

== Main cathedrals of confessions ==
#	Name	Phote	Founded	Location	Notes
1	Saint Sophia's Cathedral		11th century	Kyiv, Sofiyivska ploshcha	Constantinople
2	Cathedral of the Resurrection of Christ		building since 2007	Kyiv, 3 Zaliznychne Shose	UOC-Moscow
3	Patriarchal cathedral of St. Volodymyr		1896	Kyiv, 20 Shevchenko bulvar	UOC-Kyiv
4	Patriarchal Cathedral of the Resurrection of Christ		2013	Kyiv, 5 vulytsia Mykilsko-Slobidska	UGCC
5	St Andrew's Church		1767	Kyiv, 23 Andriyivsky Uzviz	UAOC
6	Archcathedral Basilica of the Assumption of Virgin Mary		1493	Lviv, 1 ploshcha Katedralna	Roman Catholic
7	Cathedral of the Dormition of Theotokos	Cathedral of the Dormition of Virgin Mary	1370	Lviv, 7-13 vulytsia Virmenska	Armenian
8	Cathedral of the Exaltation of the Holy Cross		1646	Uzhhorod	Mukacheve
9	Central Lutheran Cathedral of Ukraine of St. Paul	Central Lutheran Cathedral of Ukraine of St. Paul	1897	Odesa, 68 vulytsia Novoselskoho	Lutheran
10	Dormition Cathedral		1908	Bila Krynytsia, Chernivtsi Oblast	ROORC

== Cathedrals of the Ukrainian Orthodox Church (Moscow Patriarchate) ==
#	Name	Phote	Founded	Location	Notes
1	Savior-Transfiguration Cathedral (Savior)		1033	Chernihiv, Ancient Chernihiv Complex	(?)
2	Cathedral of the Dormition of Theotokos		1078	Kyiv, Kyiv Cave Monastery	(?)
3	Dormition Cathedral (St. George)		1144	Kaniv	Cherkasy eparchy
4	Cathedral of the Dormition of Theotokos		1160	Volodymyr	Volodymyr-Volynsky eparchy
5	Gated Intercession Cathedral		17th century	Putyvl Raion, Saphroni-Movchan Cave Hermitage of the Nativity of Theotokos	
6	St. Nicholas Cathedral		1650s	Nizhyn	Nizhyn eparchy
7	Cathedral of the Dormition of Theotokos		1657	Kharkiv, 11 vulytsia Universitetska	Kharkiv eparchy
8	Cathedral of the Intercession of Theotokos		1689	Kharkiv, 8 vulytsia Universitetska	(?)
9	Saint Transfiguration Cathedral		1758	Vinnytsia, 21 vulytsia Soborna	Vinnytsia eparchy
10	Cathedral of the Nativity of Theotokos		1763	Kozelets, 1 vulytsia Danevycha	(?)
11	Saint Intercession Cathedral		1768	Okhtyrka, 1 vulytsia Pushkina	Sumy eparchy
12	Trinity Cathedral		1781	Novomoskovsk, 1 ploshcha Peremohy	(?)
13	Savior-Transfiguration Cathedral		1788	Sumy, 31 vulytsia Soborna	Sumy eparchy
14	Cathedral of the Dormition of Theotokos		1791	Pochayiv, Pochayiv Lavra	(?)
15	Savior-Transfiguration Cathedral		1808	Odesa, 3 Soborna ploshcha	Odesa eparchy
16	Savior-Transfiguration Cathedral		1835	Dnipro, Soborna ploshcha	Dnipropetrovsk eparchy
17	Savior-Transfiguration Cathedral		1839	Bila Tserkva, Soborna ploshcha	Bila Tserkva eparchy
18	Ascension Cathedral		1846	Konotop, 20 vulytsia Sverdolova	Konotop eparchy
19	Savior-Transfiguration Cathedral		1874	Zhytomyr, 12 vulytsia Peremohy	Zhytomyr eparchy
20	St. Volodymyr Cathedral		1891	Sevastopol, 1 vulytsia Drevnya	(?)
21	Refectory Church		1895	Kyiv, Kyiv Cave Monastery	Kyiv eparchy
22	Tri-Anastasia Cathedral		1897	Hlukhiv, 2 vulytsia Spaska	Konotop eparchy
23	St. Annunciation Cathedral		1901	Kharkiv, 1 ploshcha Karla Marksa	Kharkiv eparchy
24	St. Panteleimon's Cathedral		1914	Kyiv, St. Panteleon Convent	(?)
25	Savior-Transfiguration Cathedral		2006	Donetsk	Donetsk eparchy
26	St. Volodymyr Cathedral		2006	Luhansk, 44 vulytsia Plekhanova	Luhansk eparchy
27	St. Intercession Cathedral			Oleksandriya	Oleksandriya eparchy
28	St. Dormition Cathedral			Balta	Balta eparchy
29	St. Trinity Cathedral			Bohuslav	Bila Tserkva eparchy
30	Cathedral of the Exaltation of the Holy Cross			Berdyansk	Berdyansk eparchy
31	St. Nicholas Cathedral			Prymorsk	Berdyansk eparchy
32	St. Intercession Cathedral			Boryspil	Boryspil eparchy
33	St. Peter and Paul Cathedral			Brovary	Boryspil eparchy
34	Epiphany Cathedral		2013	Horlivka	Horlivka eparchy
35	St. Alexander Nevsky Cathedral			Sloviansk	Horlivka eparchy
36	Intercession Cathedral			Dzhankoi	Dzhankoi eparchy
37	Savior-Transfiguration Cathedral			Rozdolne	Dzhankoi eparchy
38	St. Nicholas Cathedral		1894	Kamianske	Dniprodzerzhynsk eparchy
39	Holy Trinity Cathedral		1837	Dnipro, 7 Krasna ploshcha	Dnipropetrovsk eparchy
40	St. Nicholas Cathedral		1946	Mariupol	Donetsk eparchy
41	St. Andrew Cathedral			Zaporizhia	Zaporizhia eparchy
42	Cathedral of the St. Right-believing Prince Alexander Nevsky		1884	Melitopol	Zaporizhia eparchy
43	Cathedral of the Nativity of Christ			Ivano-Frankivsk	Ivano-Frankivsk eparchy
44	Ascension Cathedral		1826	Izyum, 2 vulytsia Komsomolska	Izyum eparchy
45	St. Nicholas Cathedral		1852	Kupiansk	Izyum eparchy
46	St. George Cathedral		1861	Kamianets-Podilskyi, 54 vulytsia Suvorova	Kamianets-Podilskyi eparchy
47	Cathedral of the Nativity of Theotokos		1812	Kropyvnytskyi, 74 vulytsia Velyka Perspektyvna	Kirovohrad eparchy
48	Cathedral of the Dormition of Theotokos			Kremenchuk (Kryukiv), 104 vulytsia Makarenka	Kremenchuk eparchy
49	Savior-Transfiguration Cathedral		2003	Kryvyi Rih, ploshcha 30ty-richia Peremohy	Kryvyi Rih eparchy
50	Savior-Transfiguration Cathedral			Nikopol	Kryvyi Rih eparchy
51	St. Nicholas Cathedral			Mohyliv-Podilsky	Mohyliv-Podilsky eparchy
52	Cathedral of the Pochayiv icon of Theotokos			Mukacheve	Mukacheve eparchy
53	Savior-Transfiguration Cathedral		1720	Pryluky, 1 vulytsia Shevchenka	Nizhyn eparchy
54	Cathedral of the Nativity of Theotokos		1800	Mykolaiv	Mykolaiv eparchy
55	St. Andrew Cathedral			Nova Kakhovka	Nova Kakhovka eparchy
56	Savior-Transfiguration Cathedral			Ovruch	Ovruch eparchy
57	Cathedral of the Dormition of Theotokos		1869	Odesa, 70 vulytsia Preobrazhenska	Odesa eparchy
58	Intercession Cathedral			Izmail, 31 prospekt Suvorova	Odesa eparchy
59	St. Makariy Cathedral			Poltava	Poltava eparchy
60	Cathedral of the Dormition of Theotokos		1889	Myrhorod	Poltava eparchy
61	Resurrection Cathedral			Rivne, vulytsia Soborna	Rivne eparchy
62	Epiphany Cathedral			Ostroh, vulytsia Zamkova	Rivne eparchy
63	Cathedral of the Nativity of Theotokos			Rovenky	Rovenky eparchy
64	Cathedral of the Holy Spirit			Romny, 15 Bazarna ploshcha	Romny eparchy
65	Intercession Cathedral		1991	Sarny	Sarny eparchy
66	Savior-Transfiguration Cathedral			Varash	Sarny eparchy
67	Cathedral of the Nativity of Christ		2001	Severodonetsk	Severodonetsk eparchy
68	St. Peter and Paul Cathedral		1870	Simferopol	Simferopol eparchy
69	Cathedral of the Martyrs Vira, Nadia, Liubov, and Sofia			Ternopil	Ternopil eparchy
70	Cathedral of the Nativity of Christ			Tulchyn	Tulchyn eparchy
71	St. Nicholas Cathedral		1812	Uman, 39 vulytsia Radianska	Uman eparchy
72	Savior-Transfiguration Cathedral			Zvenyhorodka	Uman eparchy
73	Cathedral of the Descent of the Holy Spirit		1836	Kherson	Kherson eparchy
74	Cathedral of St. Cyril and Methodius		being built	Khust	Khust eparchy
75	St. Trinity Cathedral			Vynohradiv	Khust eparchy
76	St. Michael's Cathedral		2000	Cherkasy	Cherkasy eparchy
77	St. Trinity Cathedral		1695	Chernihiv, Trinity Monastery	Chernihiv eparchy
78	Cathedral of the Holy Spirit		1864	Chernivtsi	Chernivtsi eparchy
79	St Michael's Cathedral			Shepetivka	Shepetivka eparchy
80	Cathedral of Saint Michael the Archangel		1997	Mariupol	Donetsk eparchy

== Cathedrals of the Ukrainian Orthodox Church (Kyiv Patriarchate) ==
#	Name	Phote	Founded	Location	Notes
1	St. Resurrection Cathedral			Pereiaslav	Pereiaslav eparchy
2	Cathedral of the Dormition of Theotokos		1745	Lviv	Lviv eparchy
3	St. Trinity Cathedral		1893	Ivano-Frankivsk	Ivano-Frankivsk eparchy

Notes:

- Church of the Intercession of Theotokos in Lutsk temporarily serves as a cathedral temple of the Volyn eparchy.
- Church of the Saint Hieromartyr George the Victory-bearer in Lviv temporarily serves as a cathedral temple of the Lviv eparchy.

== Additional cathedrals ==
=== Ukrainian Orthodox Church (Moscow Patriarchate) ===
Cathedrals of the Ukrainian Orthodox Church (Moscow Patriarchate):

- Birth of Christ Cathedral in Berdyansk
- Peter and Paul Cathedral in Luhansk
- St. Basil's Co-Cathedral in Izmail
- St. Basil's Cathedral in Sarny
- St. Basil's Co-Cathedral in Okhtyrka
- St. Basil's Cathedral in Khmelnytskyi

=== Ukrainian Orthodox Church of the Kyivan Patriarchate ===
Cathedrals of the Ukrainian Orthodox Church of the Kyivan Patriarchate:

- Holy Trinity Cathedral in Lutsk
- Transfiguration Cathedral in Donetsk
- Cathedral of St. Paul Konyushkevych and Assumption of Virgin Mary in Sambir
- St. Michael's Cathedral in Zhitomir
- Holy Trinity Cathedral in Zaporozhye
- Cathedral of St. Andrew in Kropyvnytskyi
- Holy Protection Cathedral in Lviv
- Cathedral of the Nativity in Odesa
- Holy Resurrection Cathedral in Pereiaslav
- Dormition Cathedral in Poltava
- Holy Protection Cathedral in Rivne
- Holy Resurrection Co-Cathedral in Rivne
- Holy Resurrection Cathedral in Sumy
- Cathedral of the Blessed Virgin in Ternopil
- Cathedral of the Transfiguration in Kremenets
- Cathedral of Candlemas in Kherson
- Cathedral of St. Andrew in Khmelnytskyi
- Holy Trinity Cathedral in Cherkassy
- Cathedral of St. Paraskevi of Serbia in Chernivtsi
- St. Catherine Cathedral in Chernihiv

== Cathedrals of the Catholic Church ==
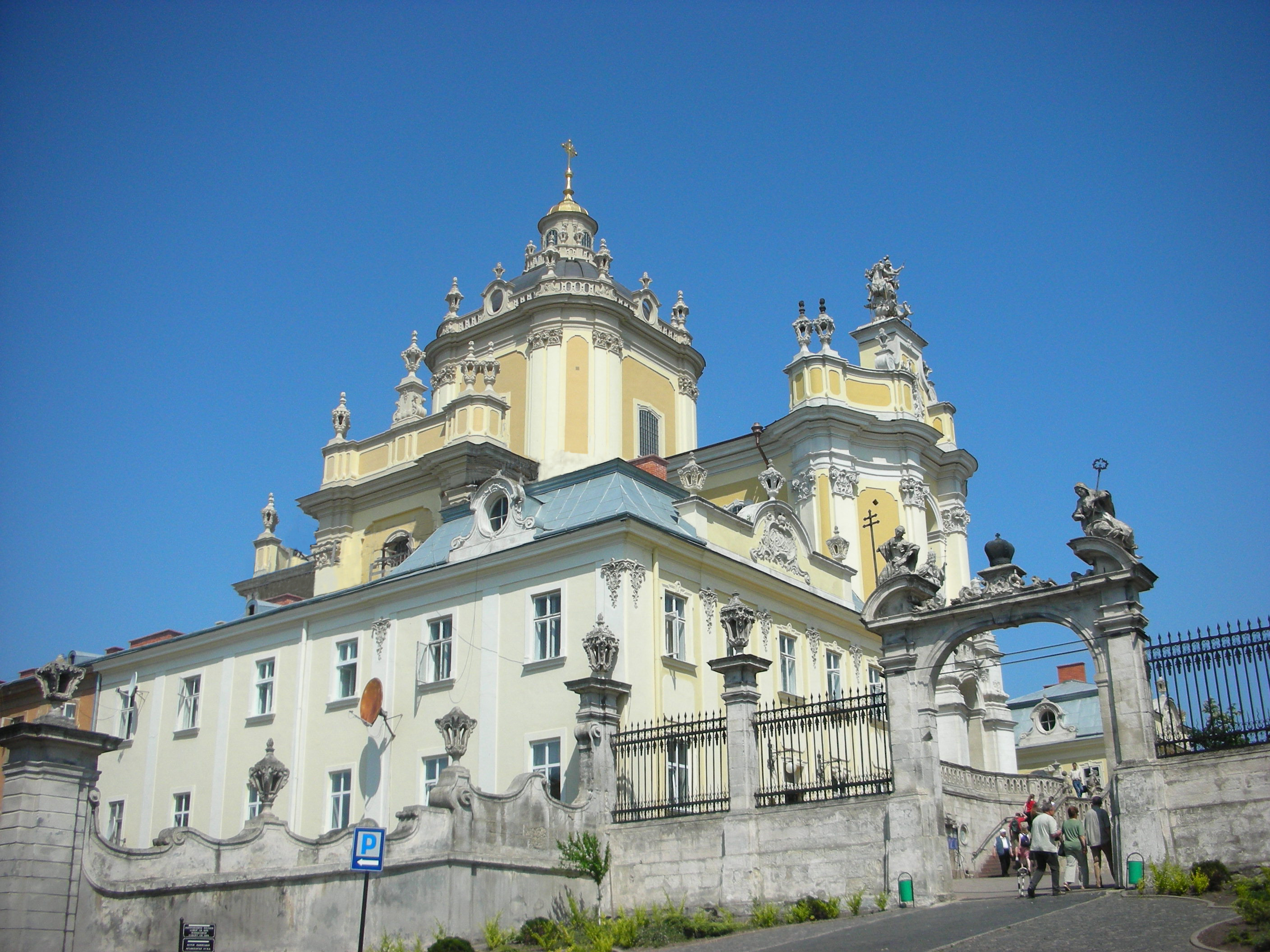
St. George's Cathedral in Lviv

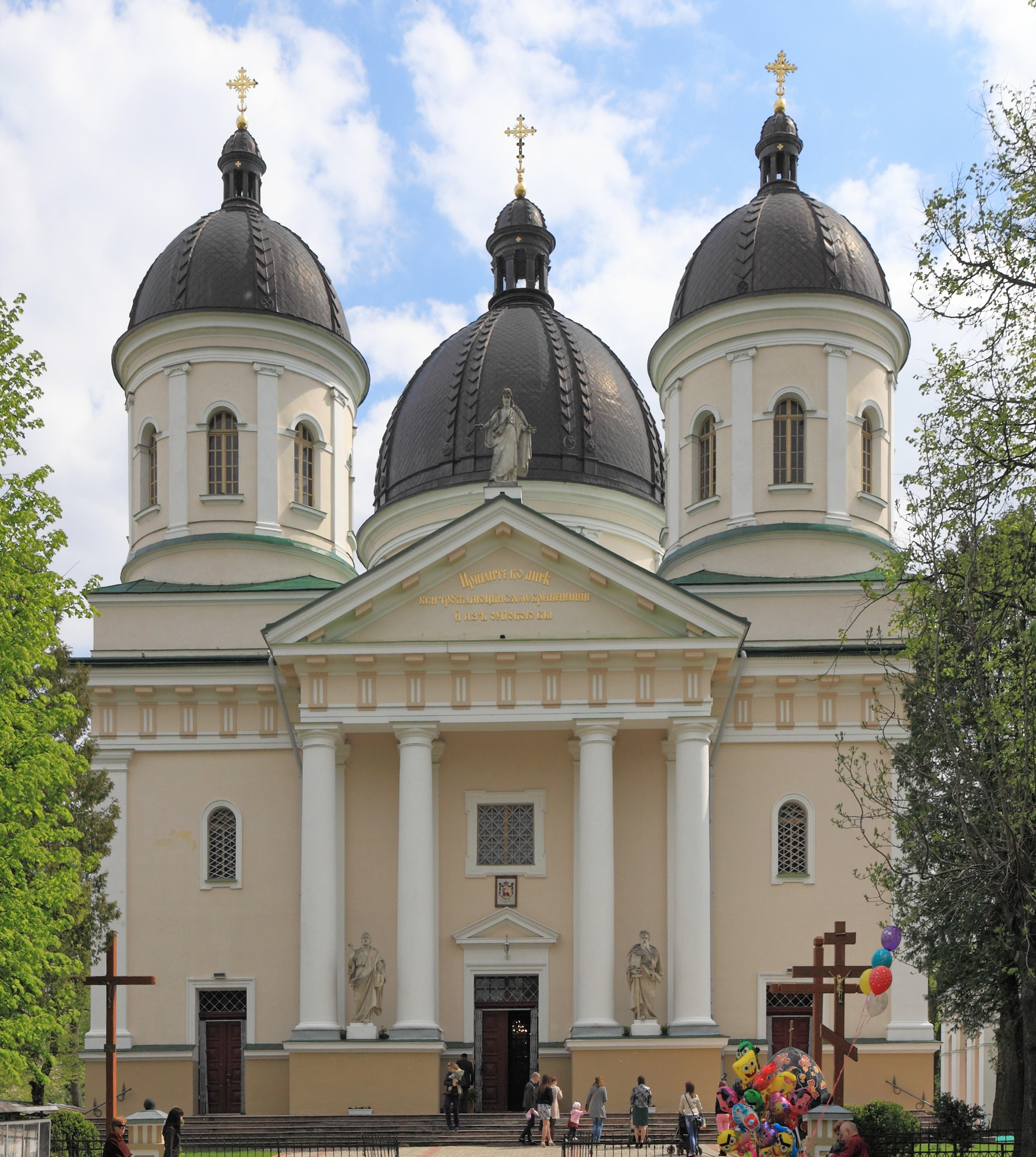
Cathedral of Saints Apostles Peter and Paul in Sokal

Cathedrals of the Catholic Church in Ukraine in full communion with the Pope in Rome. In this country there are at least 34 catholic cathedrals with 4 rites:

=== Latin Rite ===
- Cathedral Basilica of the Assumption, Lviv
- Cathedral of Sts. Peter and Paul in Kamianets-Podilskyi
- Cathedral of the Assumption Blessed Virgin Mary in Kharkiv
- Co-cathedral of the Merciful Father in Zaporizhia
- Cathedral of Holy Wisdom in Zhytomyr
- Co-Cathedral of St. Alexander in Kyiv
- Cathedral of Sts. Peter and Paul in Lutsk
- Cathedral of St. Martin of Tours in Mukacheve
- Cathedral of the Blessed Virgin Mary in Odesa

=== Ukrainian Rite ===
Cathedrals of the Ukrainian Greek Catholic Church:

- Cathedral of the Resurrection of Christ, Kyiv
- Cathedral of Sts. Peter and Paul in Chortkiv
- Cathedral of the Virgin of Mercy in Donetsk
- Cathedral of the Resurrection of Our Saviour in Ivano-Frankivsk
- Cathedral of St. Michael in Kolomyia
- Co-Cathedral of the Assumption of the Blessed Virgin Mary in Chernivtsi
- Cathedral of the Nativity of the Theotokos in Lutsk
- St. George's Cathedral in Lviv
- Cathedral of the Dormition of the Holy Mother of God in Odesa
- Cathedral of the Holy Trinity in Drohobych
- Cathedral of Sts. Ann, Peter and Paul in Sokal
- Cathedral of the Assumption of the Blessed Virgin in Stryi
- Cathedral of the Immaculate Conception of the Holy Mother of God in Ternopil

=== Armenian Rite ===
- Armenian Cathedral of the Assumption of Mary in Lviv

=== Ruthenian Rite ===
- Cathedral of the Exaltation of the Cross in Mukacheve
- Co-Cathedral of the Assumption of the Blessed Virgin Mary in Mukacheve

== See also ==
- List of cathedrals
- Christianity in Ukraine
