= Robert Francis Christian =

American Catholic prelate (1948–2019)

His Excellency, The Most Reverend Robert Francis Christian OP
- Auxiliary Bishop of San Francisco
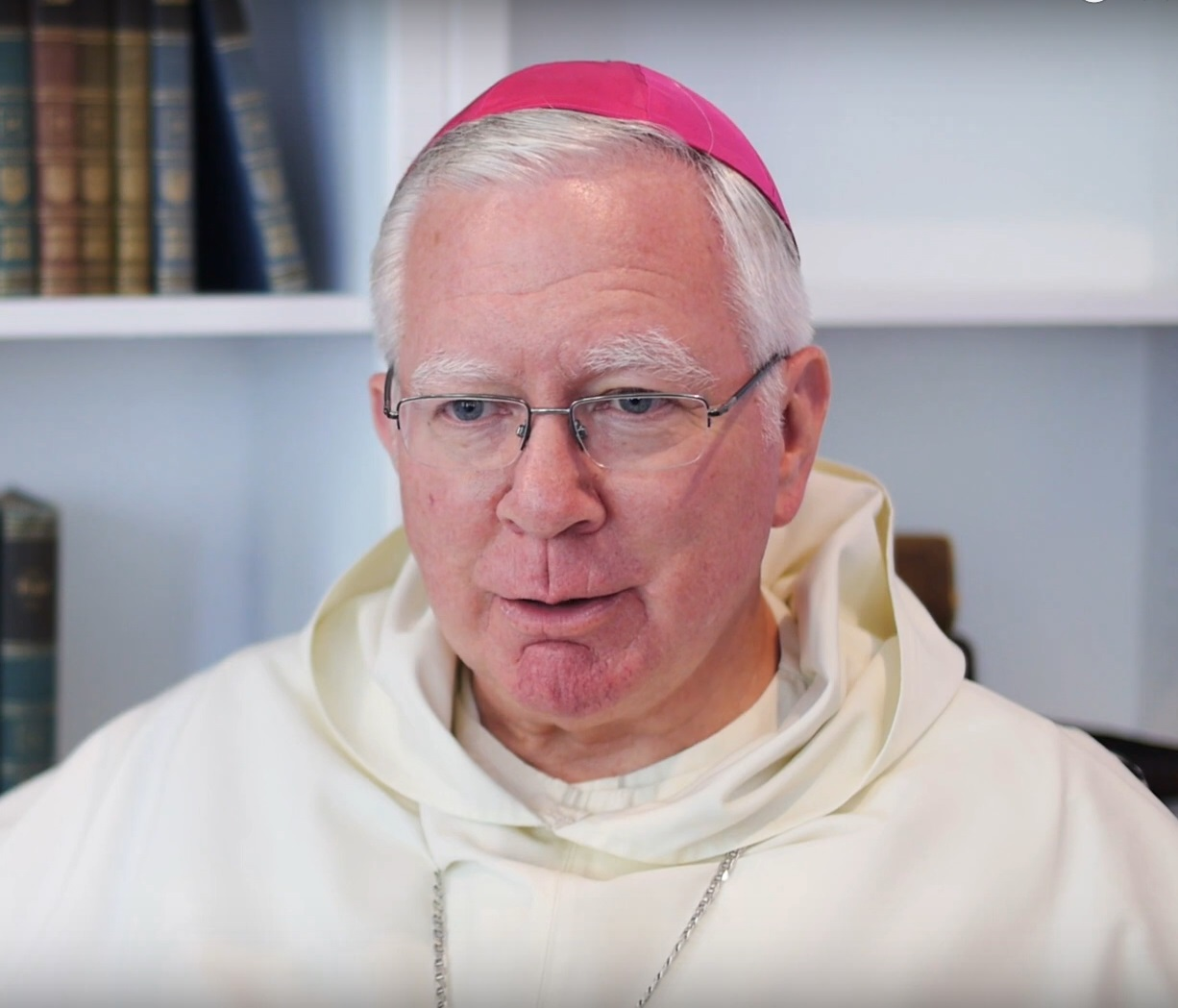
- Bishop Christian in 2018
- Archdiocese: San Francisco
- Appointed: March 28, 2018
- Installed: June 5, 2018
- Term ended: July 11, 2019
- Other post: Titular Bishop of Giru Marcelli

Orders
- Ordination: June 4, 1976
- Consecration: June 5, 2018 by Salvatore Cordileone, Michael C. Barber, and John Charles Wester

Personal details
- Born: December 2, 1948 San Francisco, California
- Died: July 11, 2019 (aged 70) Menlo Park, California
- Education: Pontifical University of Saint Thomas Aquinas; Santa Clara University
- Motto: Sanctificetur Nomen Tuum (Hallowed Be Thy Name)

Styles of Robert Francis Christian
- Reference style: His Excellency; The Most Reverend
- Spoken style: Your Excellency
- Religious style: Bishop

Robert Francis Christian, O.P. (December 2, 1948 – July 11, 2019) was an American Catholic who served as auxiliary bishop for the Archdiocese of San Francisco from 2018 until his death in 2019. He was a member of the Dominican Order.

== Biography ==
Christian was a member of the Dominican Order. On June 4, 1976, Christian was ordained to the priesthood. This followed a long teaching career, mainly at the Angelicum in Rome.

Pope Francis appointed Christian auxiliary bishop for the Archdiocese of San Francisco on March 28, 2018. On June 5, 2018, Christian was consecrated as a bishop. The Archdiocese of San Francisco announced on January 14, 2019, that Christian had been appointed Rector-President of Saint Patrick's Seminary and University. He died in his sleep on July 11, 2019, at St. Patrick's Seminary in Menlo Park, California.

== See also ==
- Catholic Church hierarchy
- Catholic Church in the United States
- Historical list of the Catholic bishops of the United States
- List of Catholic bishops of the United States
- Lists of patriarchs, archbishops, and bishops
