= Roman Catholic Diocese of Mukachevo =

Roman Catholic diocese in Ukraine

Diocese of Mukachevo Dioecesis Munkacsiensis Latinorum Єпархія Мукачево

Catholic
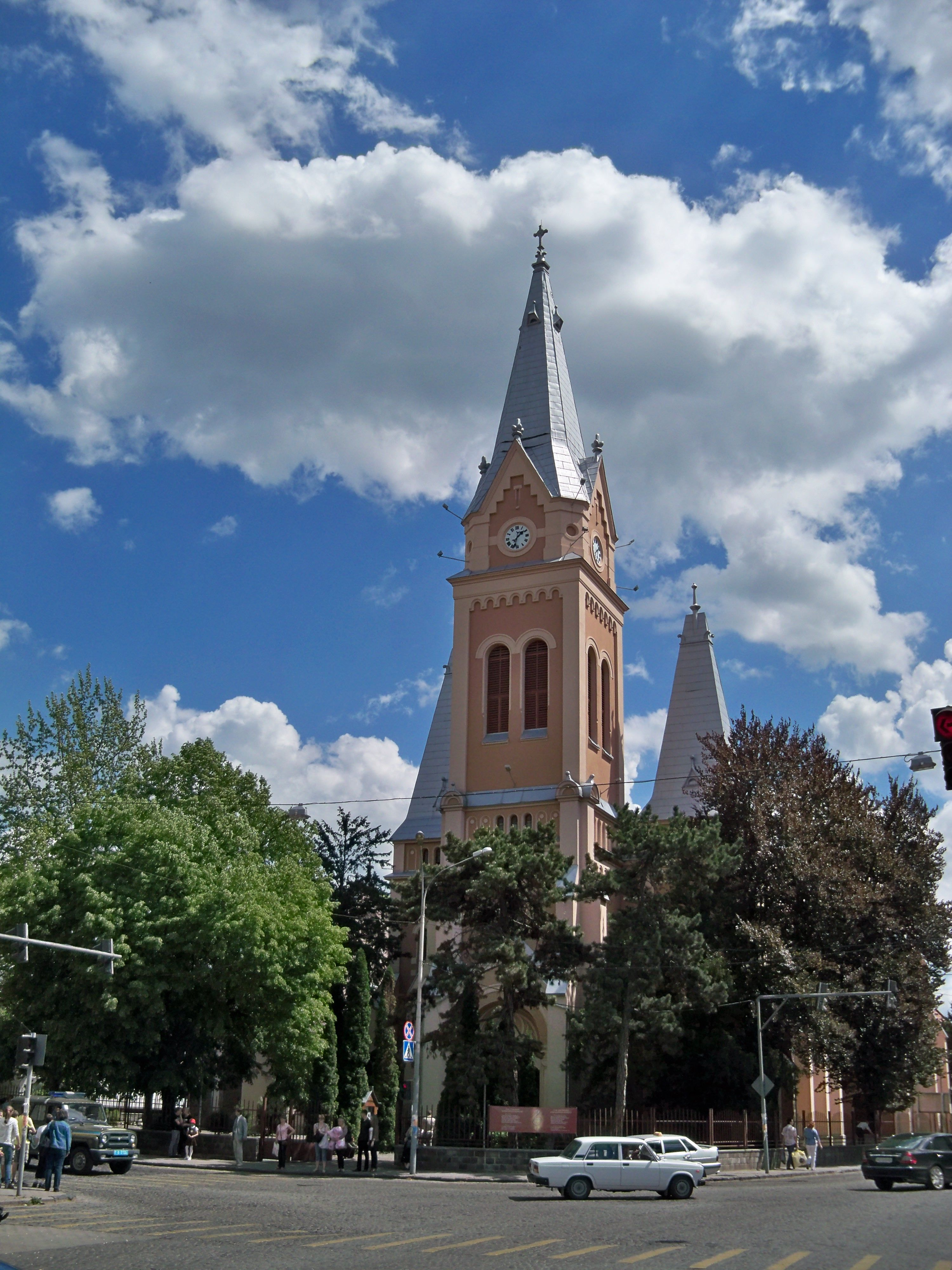
- The Cathedral of St Martin of Tours, Mukachevo

Location
- Country: Ukraine
- Ecclesiastical province: Lviv
- Metropolitan: Archdiocese of Lviv
- Population: (as of 2013); 58,000

Information
- Rite: Latin
- Cathedral: Кафедральний собор св. Мартина з Туру; Cathedral of St. Martin of Tours in Mukacheve

Current leadership
- Pope: Leo XIV
- Bishop: Mykola Luchok, O.P.
- Metropolitan Archbishop: Mieczysław Mokrzycki
- Bishops emeritus: Antal Majnek, O.F.M.

Website
- Website of the Diocese

The Roman Catholic Diocese of Mukachevo (Latin: Dioecesis Munkacsiensis Latinorum) is a diocese of the Latin Church of the Catholic Church in Ukraine. Mykola Luchok, O.P. is the current bishop of the diocese. He was appointed to the See of Mukachevo (Hungarian: Munkács) in 2019.

== History ==
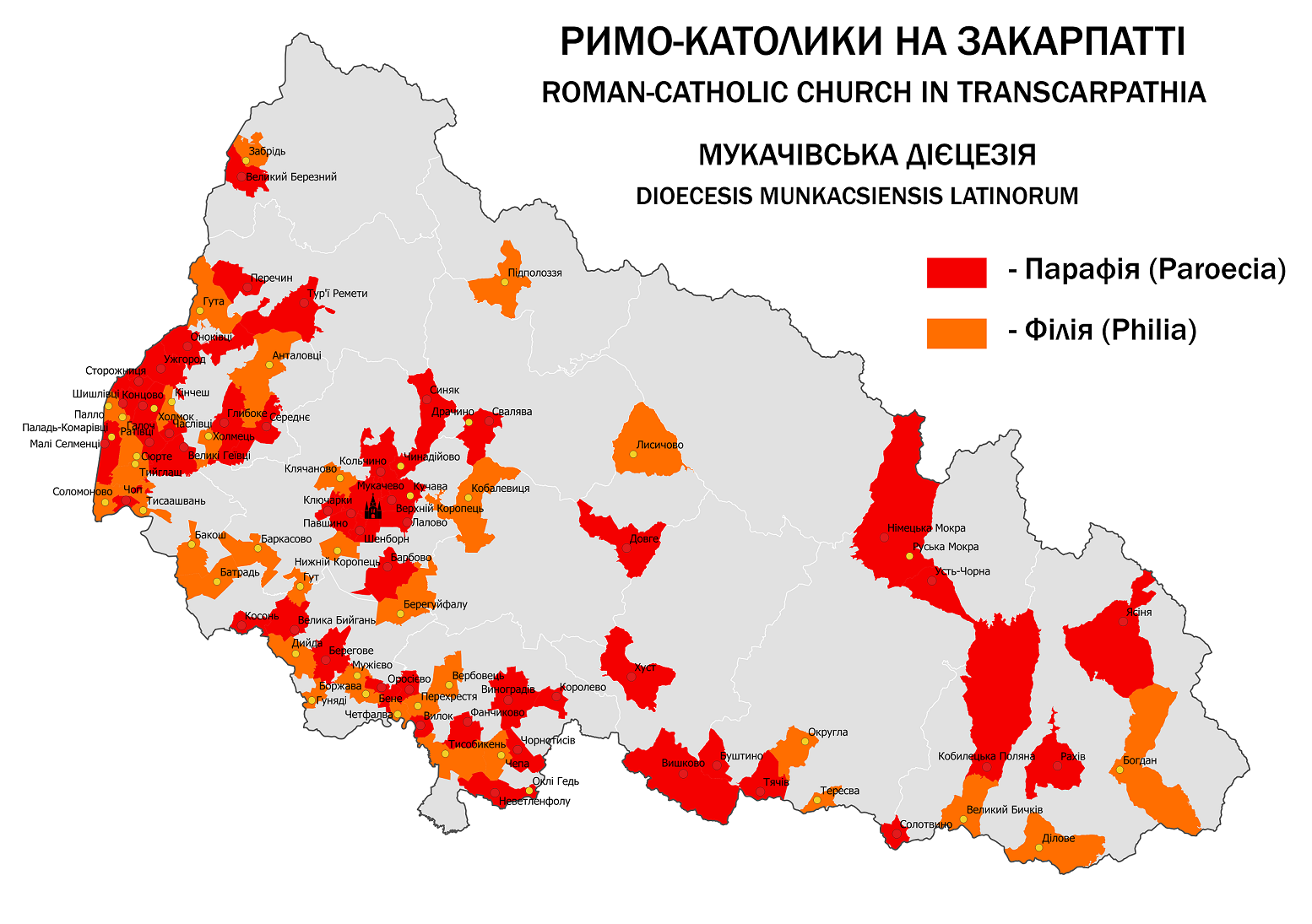
Map of Roman-Catholic parish in Transcarpathia region of Ukraine (2020)

The history of the diocese begins 1993 when the Apostolic Administration of Zakarpattia (Latin Name: Transcarpatiae Latinorum) was split off from the Diocese of Szatmár. This is unique among the Ukrainian dioceses, the remainder of which were all split off from Lviv, which has been associated with Polish culture. Mukachevo Roman Catholics are mostly members of the Hungarian minority in Ukraine. Elevated to a diocese in 2002, its first bishop was Antal Majnek until 28 January 2022.

== Geography ==
The diocese is a suffragan of the Archdiocese of Lviv of the Latins.

== Ordinaries ==
- Antal Majnek, O.F.M. (7 October 1997 – 28 January 2022)
  - Mykola Luchok, O.P. (28 January 2022 – 7 October 2023), Apostolic Administrator
- Mykola Luchok, O.P. (since 7 October 2023)

== See also ==
- Roman Catholicism in Ukraine
