= St. Peter Cathedral, Matagalpa =

St. Peter Cathedral
- Catedral de San Pedro
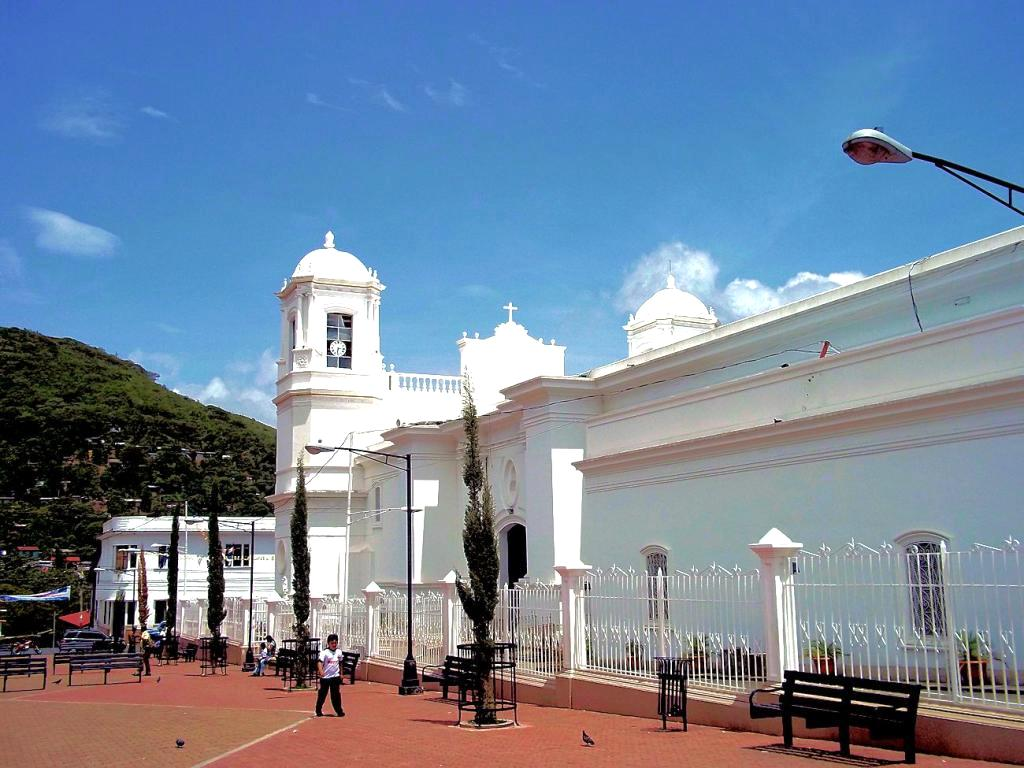
- St. Peter Cathedral
- Location: Matagalpa
- Country: Nicaragua
- Denomination: Catholic church

Administration
- Diocese: Roman Catholic Diocese of Matagalpa

The Cathedral of Saint Peter (Spanish: Catedral de San Pedro) or simply Matagalpa Cathedral, located in Matagalpa, Nicaragua, is the seat of the Roman Catholic Diocese of Matagalpa. It is dedicated to Saint Peter the Apostle.

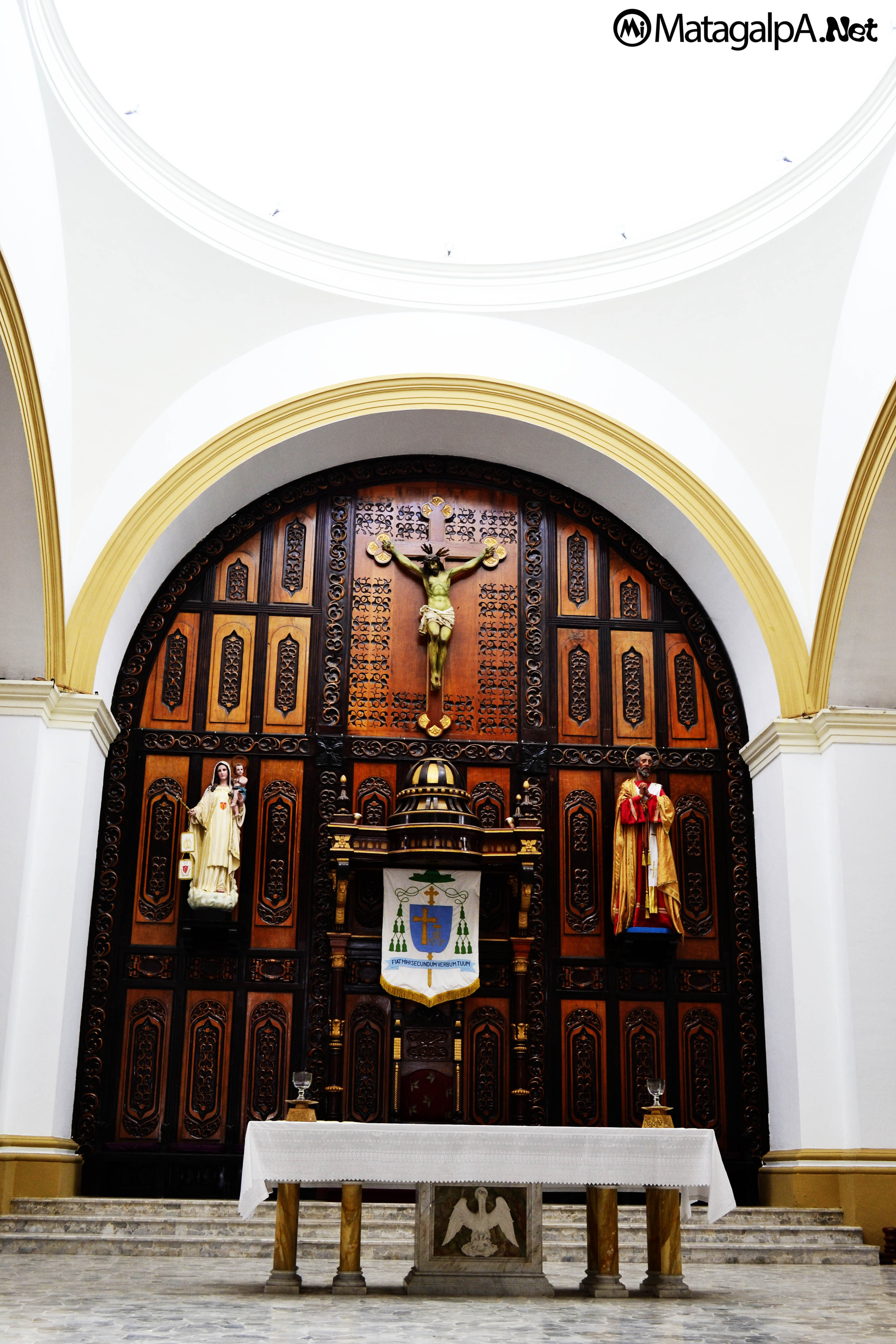
Internal View

It was built as a parish church in 1874 under the Jesuits. By 1879 the central part was completed, but the works were stopped in 1881. The church was completed in 1887, but lacking important details including the plaster, the baptistery, the interior decoration and the pulpit. It was consecrated 10 years later in 1897.

It was designated a cathedral after the erection of the diocese in 1924, by Pope Pius XI through the bull 'Animarum saluti'.

It is under the pastoral responsibility of Bishop Rolando José Álvarez Lagos.

== See also ==
- Catholic Church in Nicaragua
