= Diocese of Matagalpa =

Roman Catholic diocese in Nicaragua

Diocese of Matagalpa Dioecesis Matagalpensis
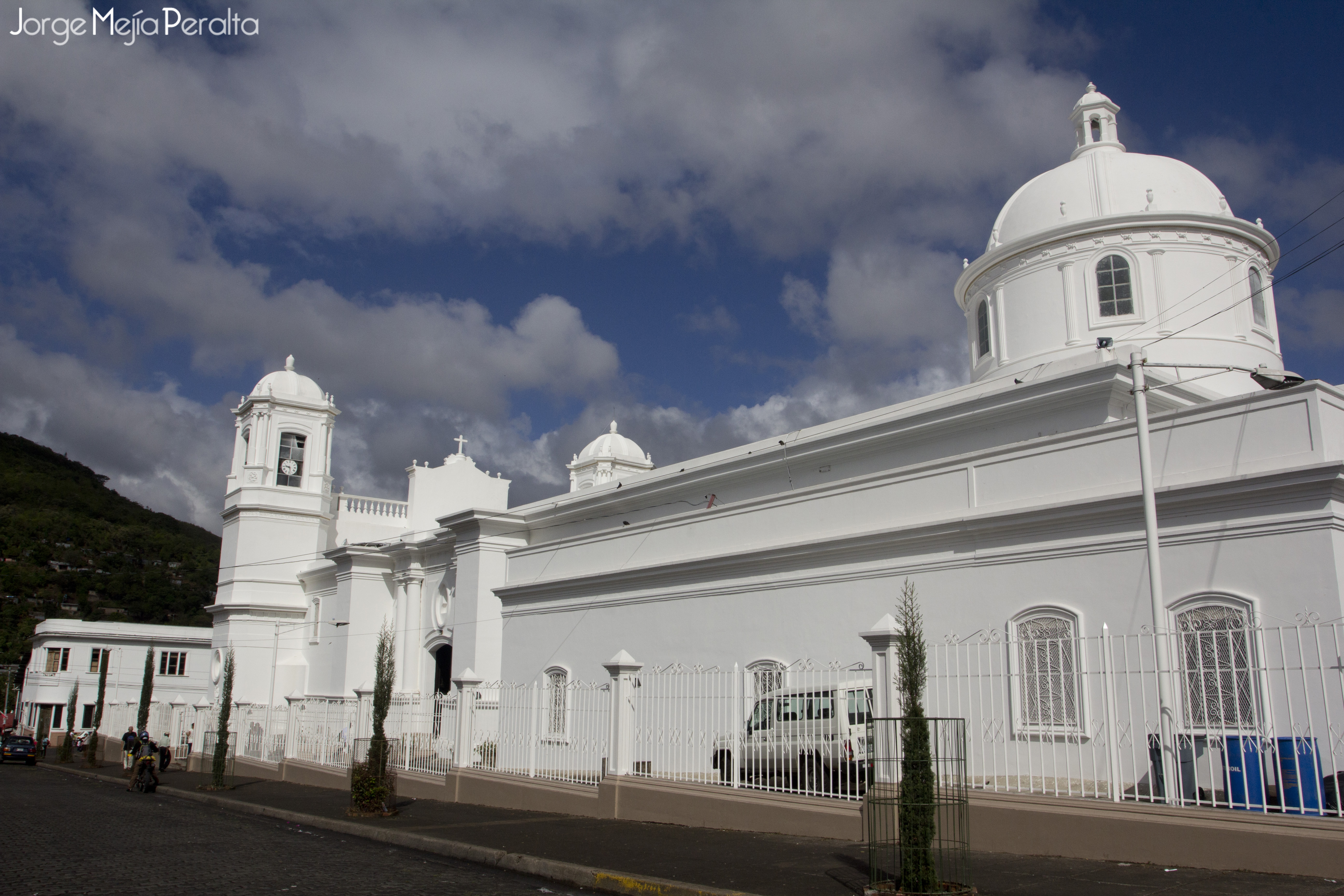
- Cathedral of St. Peter in 2013

Location
- Country: Nicaragua
- Ecclesiastical province: Province of Managua
- Metropolitan: Leopoldo José Brenes Solórzano

Statistics
- Area: 6,794 km^{2} (2,623 sq mi)
- Population: Total; Catholics: (as of 2022); 656,000; 628,000 (95.7%)
- Parishes: 28

Information
- Denomination: Roman Catholic
- Rite: Roman Rite
- Established: 19 December 1924 (101 years ago)
- Cathedral: Cathedral of St. Peter

Current leadership
- Pope: Leo XIV
- Bishop: Rolando José Álvarez Lagos

Map
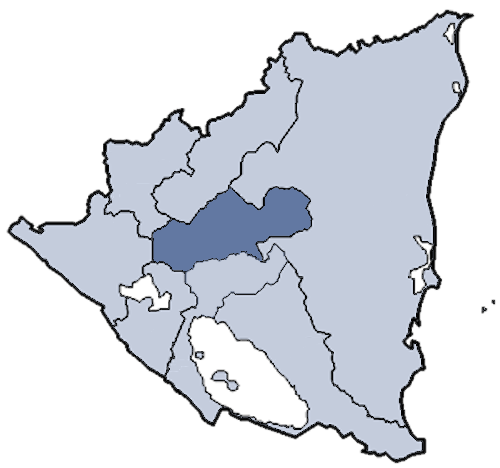

The Roman Catholic Diocese of Matagalpa (erected 19 December 1924) is a suffragan of the Archdiocese of Managua.

== Bishops ==
=== Ordinaries ===
- Isidro Carrillo y Salazar (1924–1931)
- Vicente Alejandro González y Robleto (1932–1938). appointed Coadjutor Archbishop of Managua
- Isidro Augusto Oviedo y Reyes (1939–1946), appointed Bishop of León en Nicaragua
- Octavio José Calderón y Padilla (1946–1970)
- Julián Luis Barni Spotti, O.F.M. (1970–1982), appointed Bishop of León en Nicaragua
- Carlos José Santi Brugia, O.F.M. (1982–1991)
- Leopoldo José Brenes Solórzano (1991–2005), appointed Archbishop of Managua
- Jorge Solórzano Pérez (2005–2010), appointed Bishop of Granada
- Rolando José Álvarez Lagos (since 2011)

=== Auxiliary bishop ===
- Miguel Obando Bravo, S.D.B. (1968-1970), appointed Archbishop of Managua (Cardinal in 1985)

=== Other priest of this diocese who became bishop ===
- Pedro Lisímaco de Jesús Vílchez Vílchez, appointed Bishop of Jinotega in 1982

== Territorial losses ==
Year	Along with	To form
1982		Territorial Prelature of Jinotega

== See also ==
- Catholic Church in Nicaragua
